= History of Go =

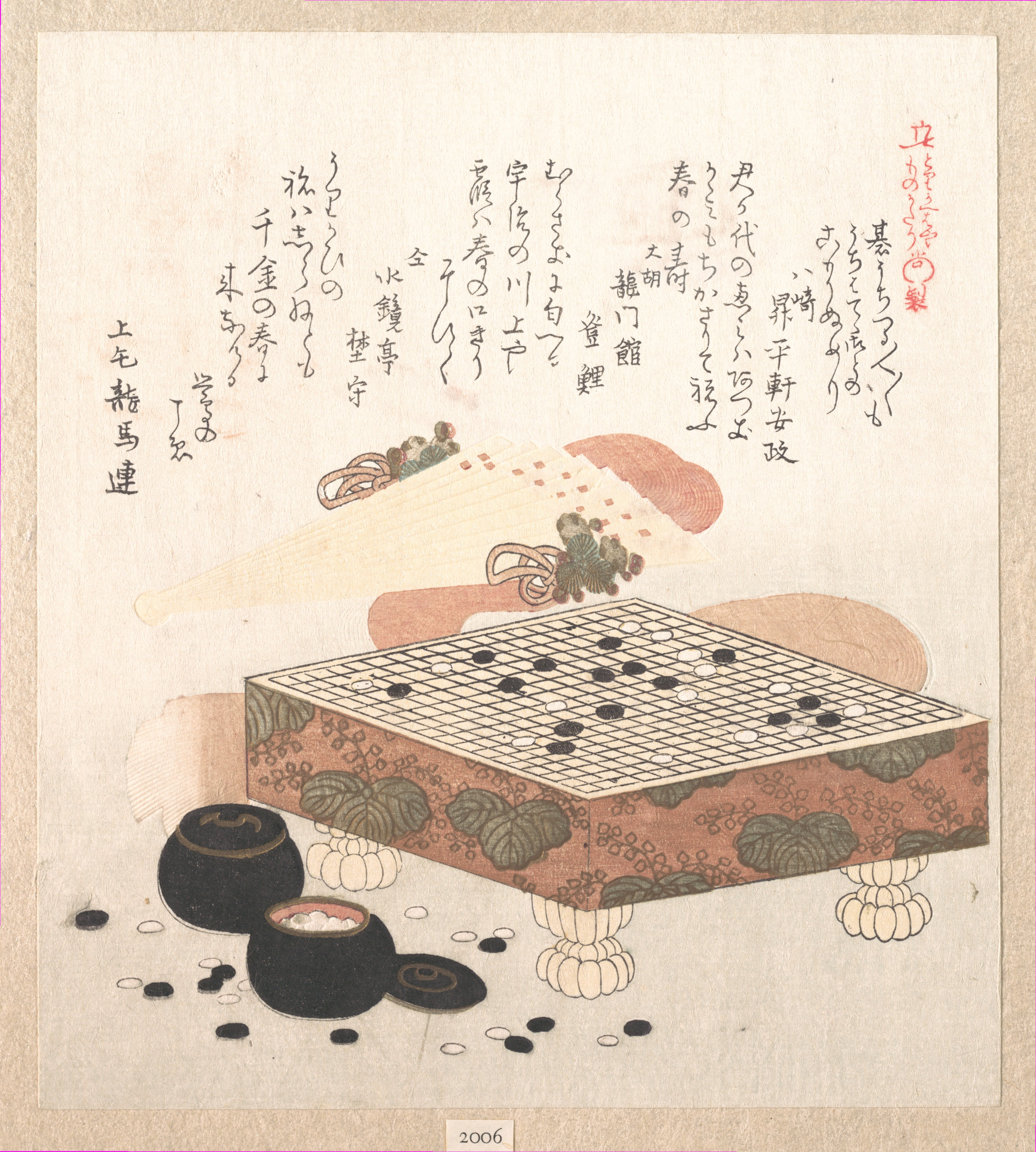
Outfit for the Go Game, Polychrome woodblock print (surimono), C. 19th century, MET.

The game of Go (simplified Chinese: 围棋; traditional Chinese: 圍棋; pinyin: wéiqí; Old Chinese: *ɢʷəj grə "surrounding game") is widely regarded as one of the world's oldest continuously played board games. Its origins are rooted in ancient China, with the earliest textual reference found in the Zuo Zhuan (c. 548 BCE). Its prestige and popularity rose over time, until it became considered one of the four essential arts of a cultured Chinese scholar. By the Tang dynasty, Go had become a major pastime at the imperial court, which also established a system of ranks and Go tournaments. Go spread from China to Korea between the 5th and 7th centuries CE, where it became known as baduk, and later to Japan in the 7th century, gaining popularity at the imperial court from the 8th century onward.

Initially played on a 17×17 grid, the standard 19×19 board emerged by the Tang dynasty (618–907 CE). Ancient Chinese and Korean Go also began the game with set stone placements. This way of setting up the board was abandoned in 1600s Japan, where players adopted the now standard empty board way of starting the game. In Japan, from the early 17th century (1603 onwards), the Tokugawa shogunate established four official Go schools and patronized highly formalized competitive play, including annual castle games in the presence of the shōgun as well as introducing a formal ranking system. These institutions extensively advanced the level of play in Japan. With the Meiji Restoration and the collapse of shogunal patronage, modern professional Go organization took shape under the Nihon Ki-in (Japan Go Association) in the early 20th century. Similar Chinese and Korean associations were also soon established to promote professional play.

Go's introduction to the Western world occurred in the late 19th century when German scholar Oskar Korschelt published descriptions of the game after his time in Japan. Western organized play followed in the early 20th century with figures like Edward Lasker founding clubs and publishing texts. Institutions such as the American Go Association (1935) and the German Go Association (1937) were established. In the post-war era, Japan played a major role in promoting Go globally through overseas centers, professional tours, and publications. By the late 20th and early 21st centuries, Go had evolved into a globally organized competitive activity, with numerous international championships, a thriving amateur community, and recognition by the International Go Federation. Another major development in the early 21st century was the rise of Go computers who could defeat the top Go professional players and help enthusiasts analyze Go games.

== Chinese history ==
In ancient China, Weiqi ("Surrounding Game", i.e. Go) grew to attain an important status among the elite classes and was often associated with ideas of self-cultivation, wisdom, and gentlemanly ideals. According to Japanese historian Miyoshi, Go flourished in China from about 200 to 600 CE, when the interest in art and literature was at a high point. Go also became one of the four cultivated arts of the Chinese scholar-gentleman, along with calligraphy, painting and playing the musical instrument guqin, and examinations of skill in those arts was used to qualify candidates for service in the imperial bureaucracy.

=== Early period ===
Go's early history is debated, but there are various traditional myths about its existence. According to legend, the game was created as a teaching tool after the ancient Chinese Emperor Yao 堯 designed it for his son, Danzhu 丹朱, to learn discipline, concentration, and balance. Another suggested genesis for the game is that it developed from the experiences of hunting and warfare, which were based on surrounding one's target / enemies. Other theories relate Go equipment to divination and geomancy, but there is little evidence for this according to Shotwell. However, according to Japanese scholar Shirakawa Masayoshi, the stones may be linked symbolically to the earth, with black and white representing forces channeled along the board's lines in a manner conceptually related to acupuncture and feng shui geomancy; Shirakawa further connects the game to the River Chart said to underlie the divinatory system of the I Ching. A structural reading of the Yao myth interprets it as a clash of opposing elements (heaven (Yao), earth (Shun), and water (Danzhu)), tied to the theme of controlling the floods of the Yellow River. Confucius himself is said to have criticized the game as inducing greed and idleness.

The earliest written reference of the game is usually taken to be the historical annal Zuo Zhuan (c. 4th century BCE), referring to a historical event of 548 BCE. It is also mentioned in Book XVII of the Analects of Confucius and in two of the books of Mencius (c. 3rd century BCE). In all of these works, the game is referred to as yì (弈; Old Chinese: *ɢrak). The rules of the earliest forms of Go are unknown, but some scholars believe that in one variant, victory was achieved by having more stones on the board than your opponent. There is also speculation that the rules were simple, similar to those of the simplified variant rules of "Pure Go".

=== Han, Wei, and Jin Dynasties ===
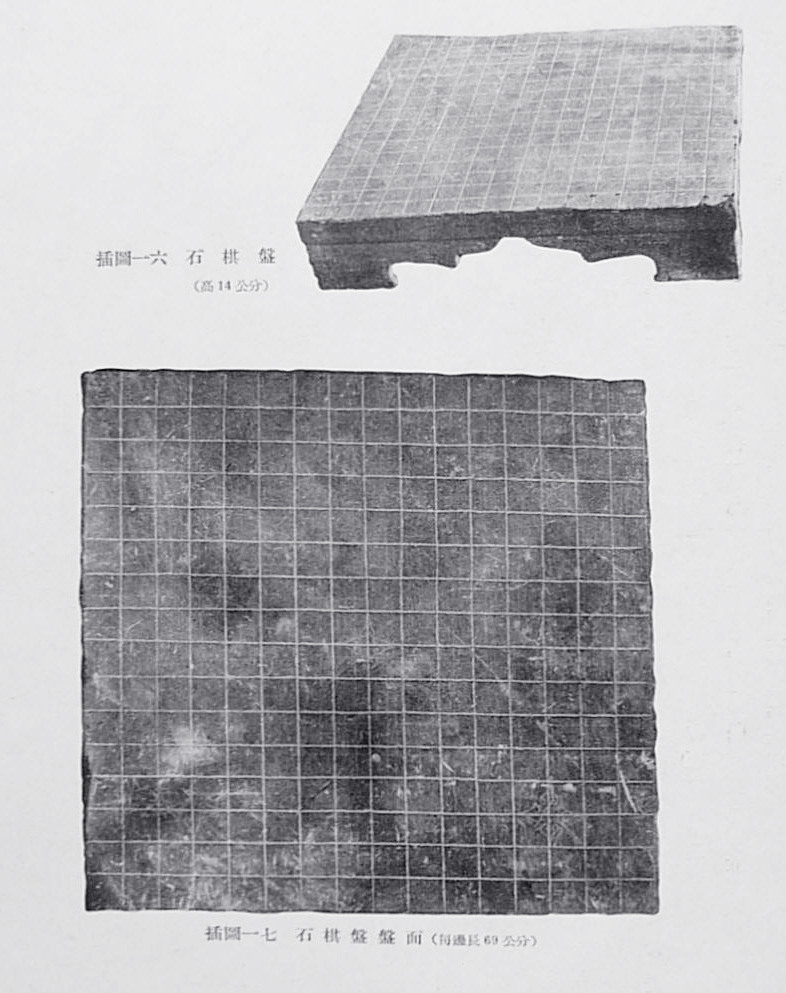
Stone Weiqi board from the Han dynasty (206 BCE–220 CE), excavated from a tomb in Wangdu County, Hubei province

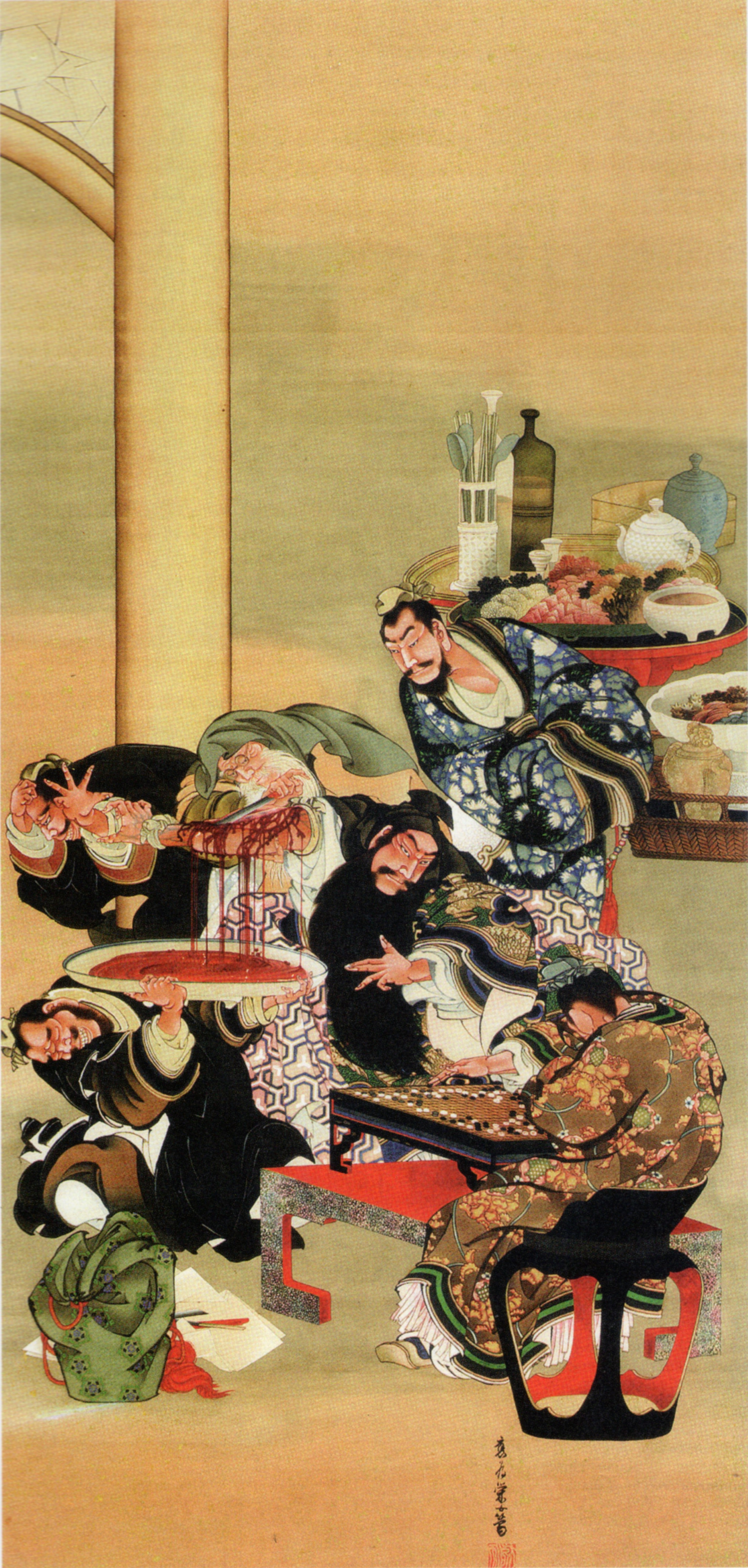
Katsushika Ōi's (1800–1866) Operating on Guan Yu's Arm, depicting Guan Yu playing weiqi while undergoing surgery. Color on silk.

During this period, Weiqi, along with the dice game "Liubo," were collectively called "Bóyì" (博弈). These games spread among the upper classes. During the Western Han, the luck-based "Liubo" was more popular than Weiqi. But by the Eastern Han era (25–220 CE), Weiqi gradually gained more esteem as it was seen as analogous to military strategy. Ban Gu's Yì Zhǐ (The Essentials of Go) is considered the world's first specialized book on Weiqi. Ma Rong, in his Wéiqí Fù (Rhapsody on Weiqi), was the first to express the idea that "a board three chi square becomes a battlefield."

Famous figures of the Eastern Han such as Cao Cao, Sun Ce, and Wang Can were all fond of Weiqi. The Romance of the Three Kingdoms, a classic Chinese novel, includes a well known story of Guan Yu playing Go while undergoing surgery for an arrow wound.

Chinese archaeologists have discovered a broken piece of a pottery go board from the Western Han dynasty (206 BCE – 24 CE) in Shaanxi Province. This is the earliest discovery of an existing board unearthed in China. The board was found in the ruins of a watchtower at the tombs of Emperor Jingdi and Empress Wang Zhi of the Western Han dynasty. The broken fragment of the board measures 5.7 cm to 28.5 cm long, 17 cm to 19.7 cm wide and 3.6 cm thick. Li Gang, a research fellow with the Shaanxi Provincial Archaeological Research Institute, said that this board might have been made from a floor tile, and that it did not belong to the royal family since the carvings are too rough. Li said the board could have been made by the tomb guards who played go to pass the time. "That proves that go was being played not only by nobles, but also by ordinary people like tomb guards, more than 2,000 years ago", Li noted.

In 1954 a complete Go board made out of stone was found in a tomb dating to the Eastern Han dynasty (25–220) in Wangdu County, Hebei Province. This board has a 17 × 17 grid, which confirms the statement by the 3rd century author Handan Chun in the Classic of Arts that Go was at this time played on a 17 × 17 grid:

The go board has 17 lines along its length and breadth, making 289 points in all. The black and white stones each number 150.

While Weiqi was popular with many groups during the Han, it was also criticized by Confucian authors and Han historians. Confucian moralists saw the game as a waste of time, as the pastime of gamblers and as a game that only distracted gentlemen from the proper Confucian arts like music, ritual and government duties.

=== Golden Age of Weiqi ===
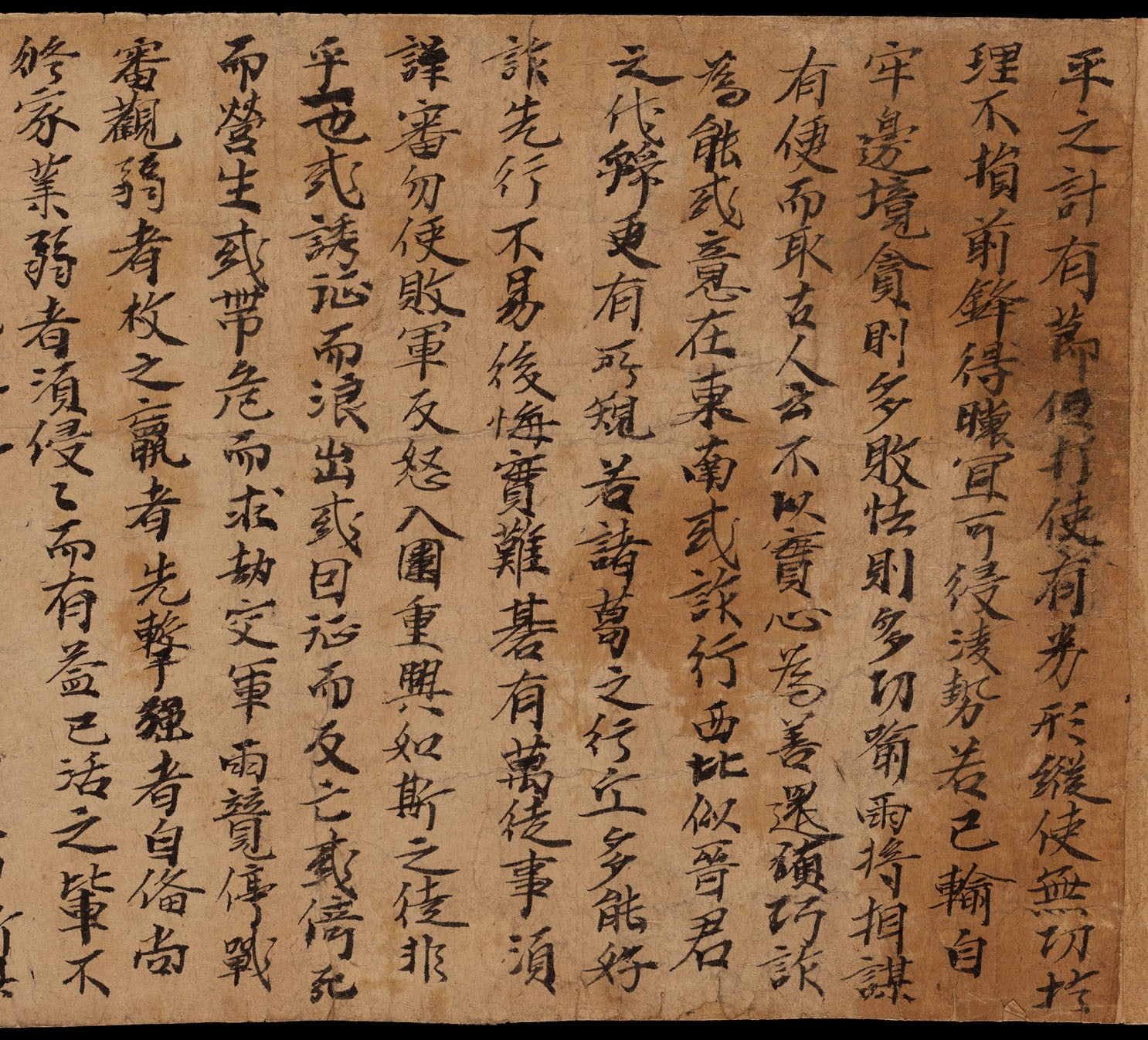
The opening section of the Dunhuang Go Manual (6th century CE)

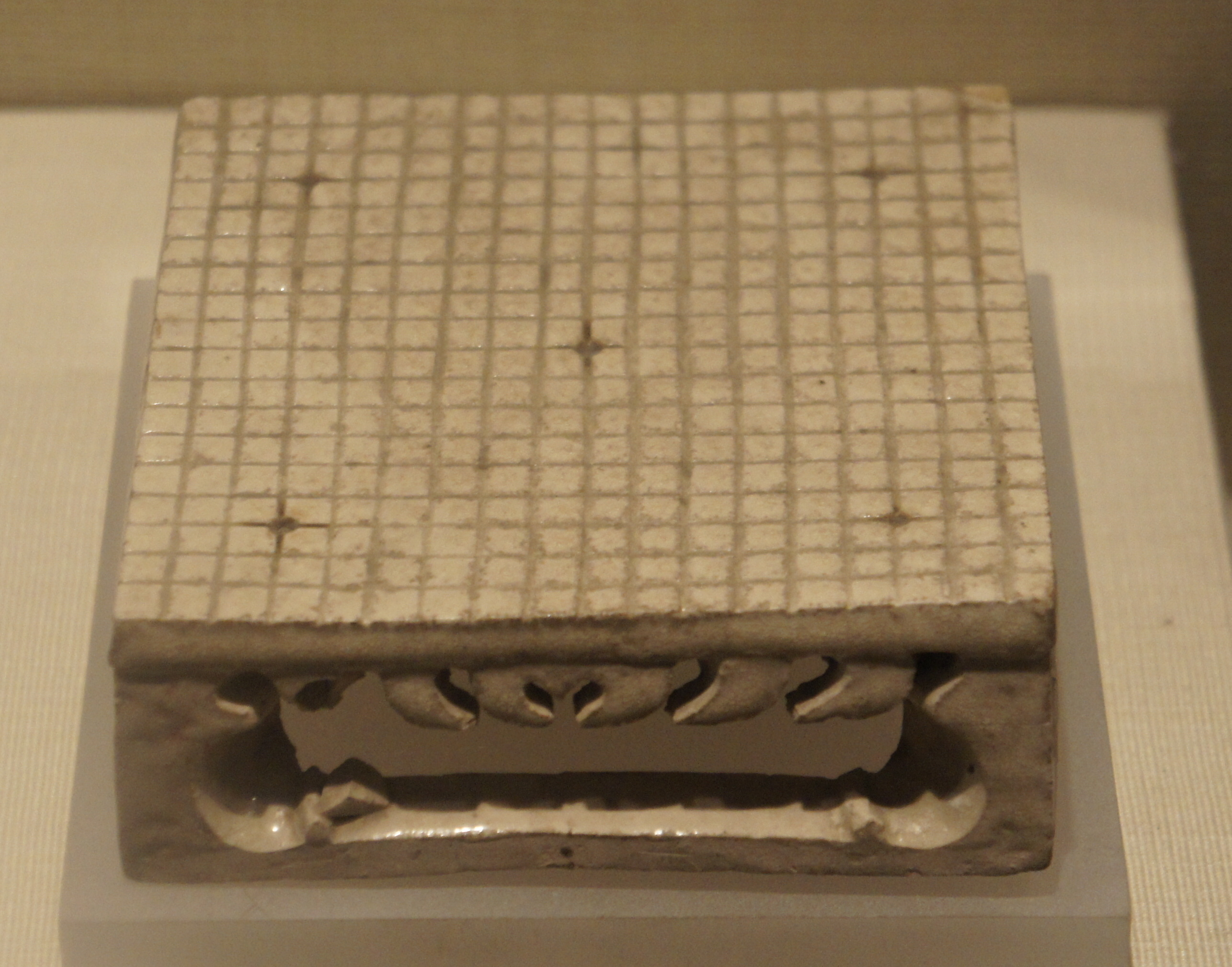
A ceramic 19 x 19 board preserved from the Sui dynasty (581–618 CE)

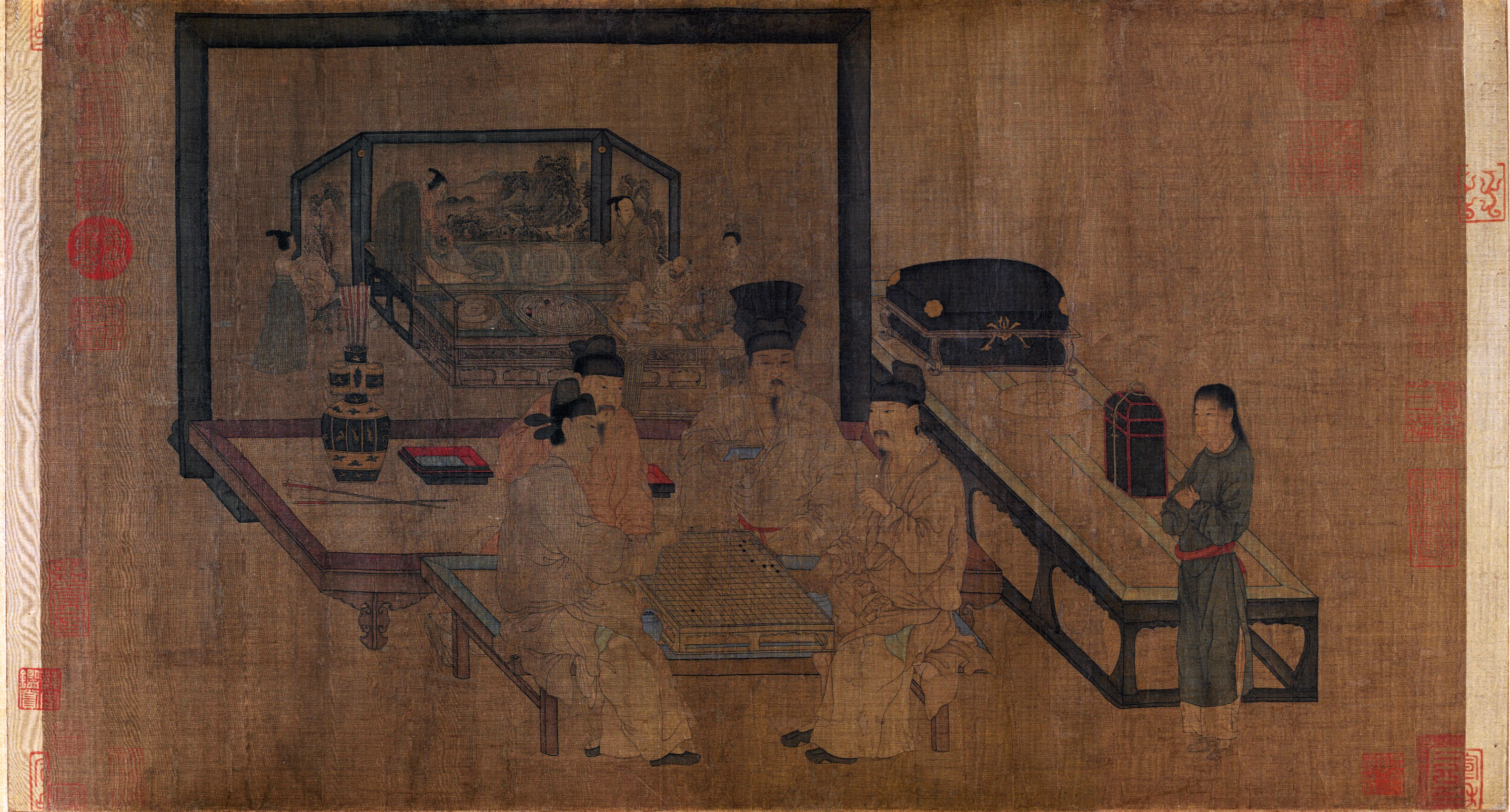
Li Jing playing Go with his brothers. Painting by Zhou Wenju (fl. 942–961), Southern Tang dynasty.

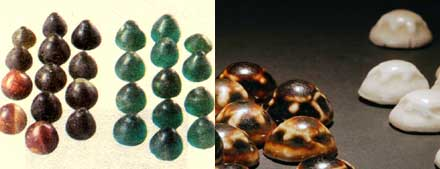
Go stones from the Tang and Song Dynasties.

During the Northern and Southern Dynasties period, Weiqi became popular among literati and refined scholars in the South. The board expanded to 19x19 during this time, as can be seen from various historical sources. The first book dedicated to Go, the Dunhuang Go Manual (c. 6th century CE), dates to this period. It was found in the Mogao Caves in Dunhuang, and discusses the game as played on a 19x19 board. More pre-modern Chinese books devoted to the game were written during the Tang and Song dynasties. The earliest board with a 19x19 grid to have been found is a ceramic board dating to the Sui dynasty (581–618) that was excavated from Anyang in Henan Province. Thus, the change in board size must have occurred sometime between the 3rd and 6th centuries. However, the 17×17 board has survived in the version of Go played in Tibet.

The Southern Dynasties established a system of Go grades (Qípǐn) and the Weiqi Provincial Capital (Wéiqí Zhōuyì) system, categorizing professional players into different grades and providing them with stipends. Emperor Wu of Liang (464–549) composed his own Wéiqí Fù (Rhapsody on Weiqi) to promote the game, ushering in a golden age for Weiqi. Emperor Wu also organized a national Weiqi tournament. This is the first documented national tournament. After the tournament, 278 players were confirmed to have achieved a rank, either Upper Grade (Shàngpǐn) or Entry Grade (Rùpǐn).

During the Tang Dynasty (618 to 907), Weiqi continued to develop. The first Tang emperor valued Go, and appointed top players political posts, believing that their skill could transfer into real life commands. He also established a ranking system for Go players. Later Tang rulers also held that the Confucian virtues could be cultivated through Go playing.

The Tang court also established the position of Qídàizhào (Go Attendant), specifically for players who would play Go with the emperor. Wang Jixin (王积薪) was a master during the Kaiyuan era and compiled the famous Ten Golden Rules of Go (围棋十决). The classic ten rules are a set of four character phrases, which are the following:

1. 不得贪胜 (Bùdé tān shèng) - Avoid Greed or you Won't Win: This rule advises against overreaching for a larger win than the position allows. A secure, small-margin victory is far superior to a risky play for a big win that backfires and turns the game. It emphasizes solid, error-free play over ambitious but vulnerable attacks.
2. 入界宜缓 (Rù jiè yí huǎn) - Enter Opponent's Territory Cautiously: When invading or reducing an opponent's territorial framework, one should not rush in deeply or blindly. The approach should be gradual, light, and flexible, with a plan for retreat. This avoids creating heavy, vulnerable groups that become a burden and a target for attack.
3. 攻彼顾我 (Gōng bǐ gù wǒ) - Look After Yourself When Attacking: A true attack in Go is not merely about capturing stones; it is about strengthening your own position. Before launching an assault, you must ensure your own groups are secure and without weaknesses. The ideal attack is one that simultaneously pressures the opponent and solidifies your own influence and territory.
4. 弃子争先 (Qì zǐ zhēng xiān) - Sacrifice Stones to Seize the Initiative: This is a core strategic concept. The initiative, here seen as the power to make a move that demands a response, is extremely valuable. It is often wise to willingly sacrifice a few stones to regain the initiative, allowing you to play a crucial move elsewhere on the board. The global gain from leading the play outweighs the local loss of the sacrificed stones.
5. 舍小就大 (Shě xiǎo jiù dà) - Relinquish the Small to Save the Large: A player must constantly evaluate the relative value of every point on the board. The "large" refers to high-value points that affect overall influence and territory, while the "small" are less consequential areas. Superior strategy involves ignoring minor, local skirmishes to secure the biggest, most important plays that determine the outcome of the entire game.
6. 逢危须弃 (Féng wēi xū qì) - When in Danger, Sacrifice: If a group of stones is under severe attack and cannot be saved without incurring massive losses elsewhere, the correct strategy is to abandon it. Trying desperately to save a "dead" group will only compound your problems, making your other groups weak and handing your opponent even more influence. A timely sacrifice can turn a crisis into a manageable situation.
7. 慎勿轻速 (Shèn wù qīng sù) - Be Prudent; Avoid Hasty Moves: This rule cautions against playing quickly and without deep reading. Every move should be considered carefully for its consequences and how it fits into a larger plan. Hasty, superficial play leads to blunt attacks, weak shapes, and critical errors. True strength lies in thoughtful, calculated, and "thick" play that builds a resilient position.
8. 动须相应 (Dòng xū xiāng yìng) - Moves Must Work Together: Your strategy should be coherent and interconnected. A move in one area of the board should have a purpose that relates to and supports your groups in other areas (as well as responds well to your opponent's moves and positioning). Before starting a fight or making a strategic play, you should prepare with forcing moves that build a network of support, ensuring your actions are effective and not isolated.
9. 彼强自保 (Bǐ qiáng zì bǎo) - When the Opponent is Strong, Strengthen Yourself: Do not directly confront your opponent's areas of overwhelming strength and thickness. Playing near their solid formations is inherently dangerous and gives their strength purpose. Instead, the smart response is to keep your distance and focus on reinforcing your own weak groups, ensuring they are safe and stable before engaging elsewhere.
10. 势孤取和 (Shì gū qǔ hé) - When Isolated and Weak, Seek Balance: If you have a group that is weak, isolated, and under threat, seeking an all-out fight is often suicidal. The wiser course is to "make peace" by finding a way to help the group settle and live simply, even if it means conceding some local points or influence. This avoids a devastating loss and preserves potential for the future, allowing you to continue the game on balanced terms.

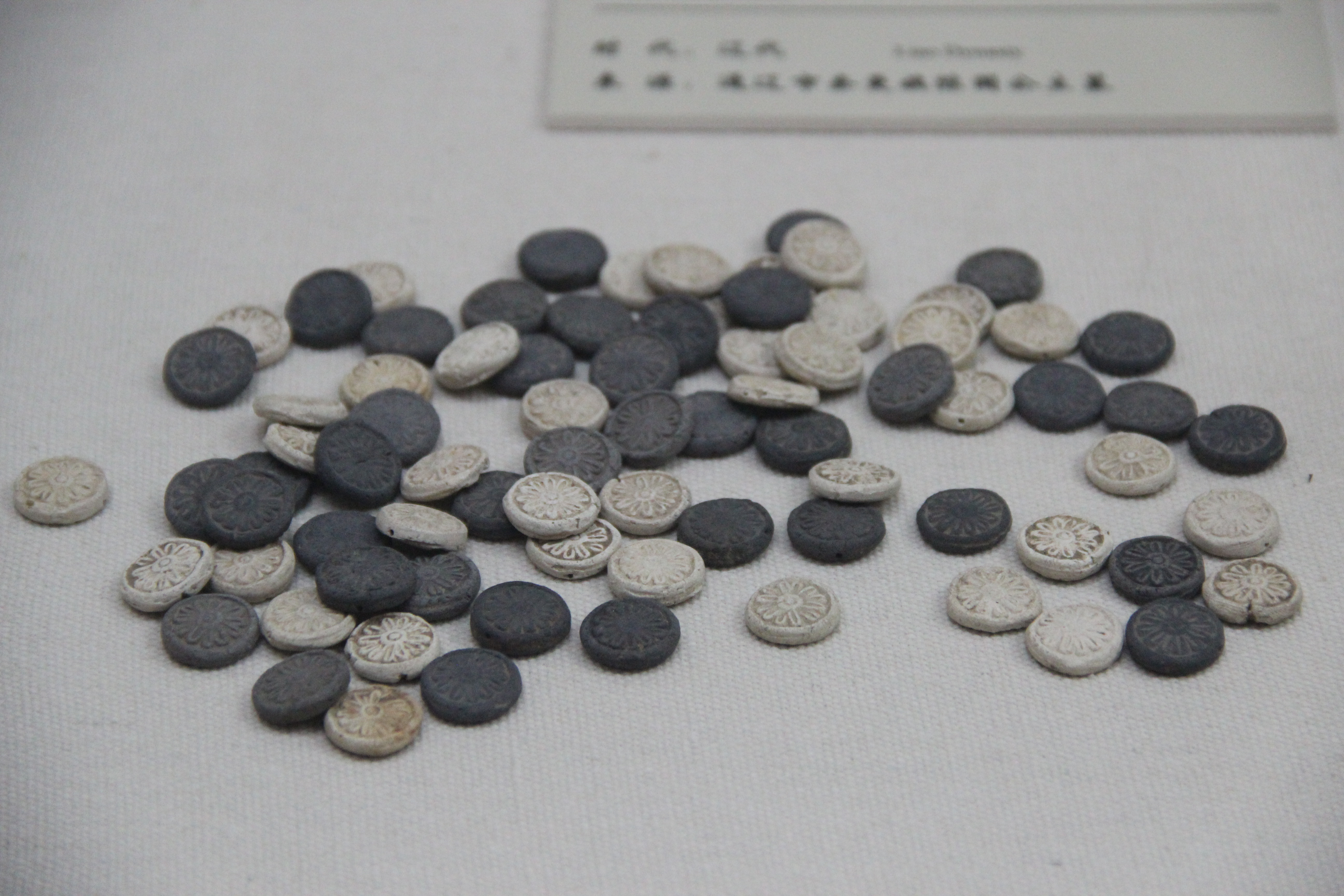
Carved weiqi pieces of the Liao dynasty (916-1125 CE)

Today, these phrases are considered classical Weiqi theory and are often posted in Go clubs on placards or signs. Legend says Wang Jixin dreamed of an Azure Dragon spitting out the Qí Jīng Jiǔ Bù (Nine Part Go Classic) and bestowing it upon him. From that time on his skill improved. Another legend from says that Wang Jixin, fleeing the An Lushan Rebellion, went to Shu Province and witnessed a game between a mother-in-law and daughter-in-law on Mount Li. The Song Dynasty book Wàng Yōu Qīng Lè Jí (Collection of Carefree Pure Joy) contains a game record by Wang Jixin titled "One Move Resolves Two Double Ataris" (some say this game was between Gu Shiyan and the Japanese Crown Prince).

In the 25th year of Kaiyuan (737 CE), the player Yang Jiying went as an envoy to Korea, and no Silla player could match his skill. About a hundred years later, Gu Shiyan played against the Japanese Crown Prince in Chang'an. This can be considered the first formal Sino-Japanese match. In this game, Gu Shiyan decisively secured a victory with a move later called the "Divine Touch".

=== Later dynasties ===
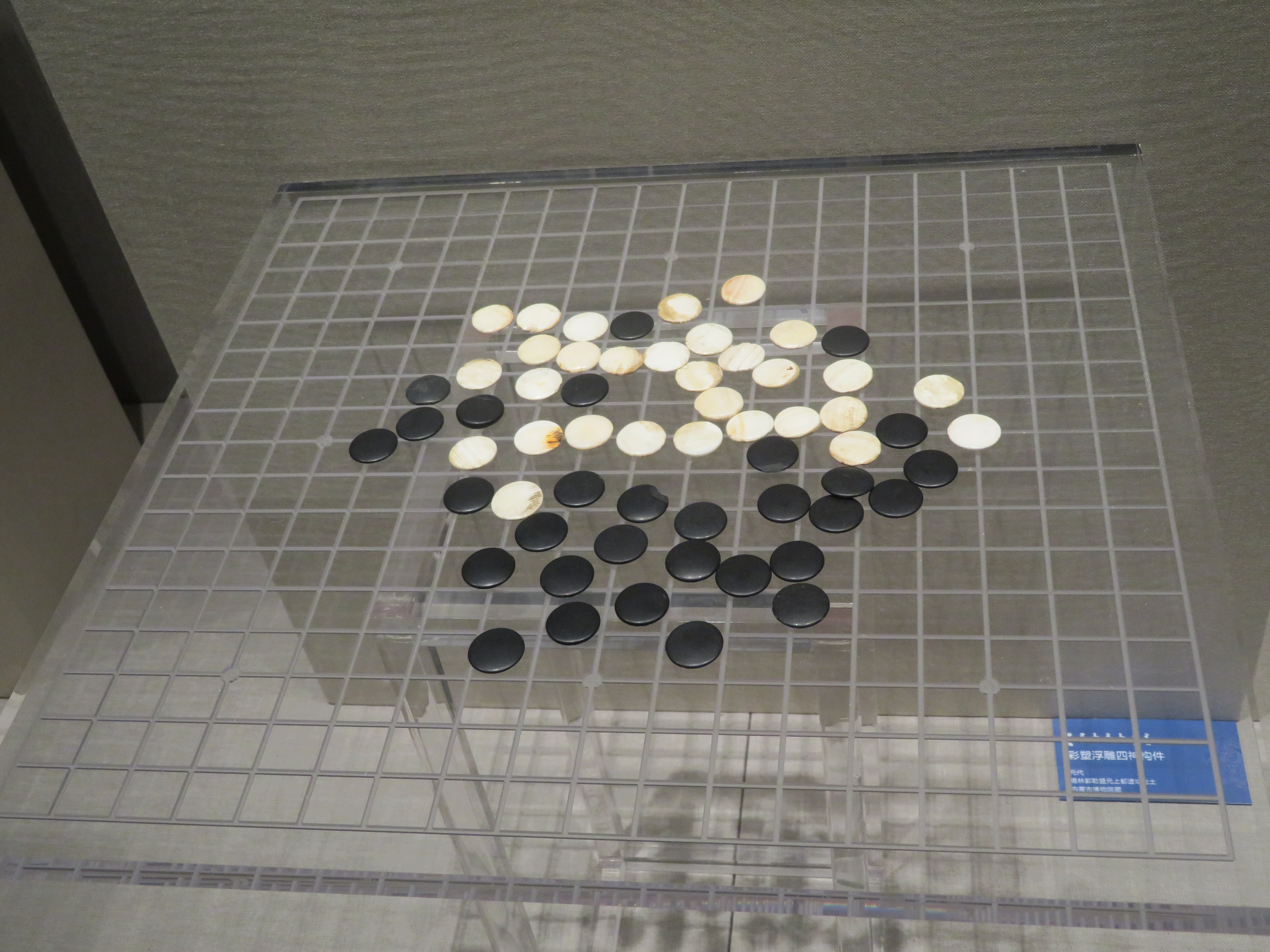
Black and white weiqi pieces dated to the Yuan dynasty (1271–1368 CE)

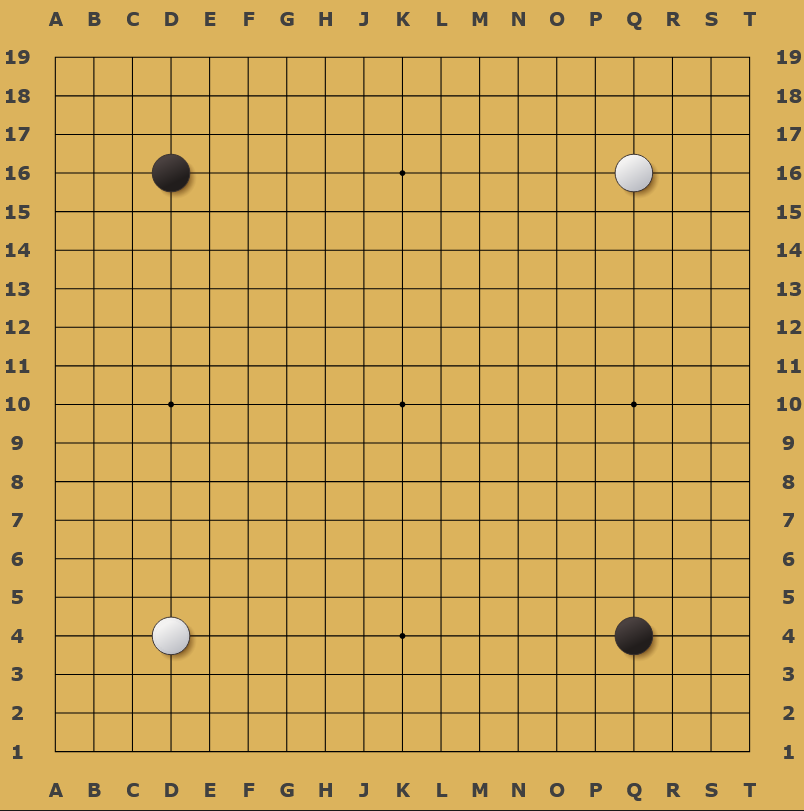
Standard fixed stone setup for playing ancient Chinese Weiqi (Go)

During the Song Dynasty (960-1279), Weiqi remained popular and many treatises on Go strategy and technique were written. Wang Ni's The Classic of Weiqi (1050 CE) in thirteen fascicles was one early example of the Song era treatises. It combined Confucian, Daoist, and Buddhist philosophy with explanations of the game and strategies. This text links the black and white pieces to the concept of Yin and Yang, and the three hundred and sixty one intersections of the board to the days of the year.

Throughout most of the Chinese history of Go, the game began with several stones already on the board (often two stones for each player). The system of fixed stone placements was termed Zuozi Zhi (座子制). The Japanese abolished this system in the 1600s, but it remained the main way to set up the game in China until 1949. Regarding scoring, before the Ming dynasty (1368-1644), games were scored through territory scoring (points were given for each intersection within one's territory), while during the Ming, scoring changed to stone scoring. Stone scoring games continued until no more stones could be placed on the board without leading to the death of a stone formation. Then the total number of stones were counted as points.

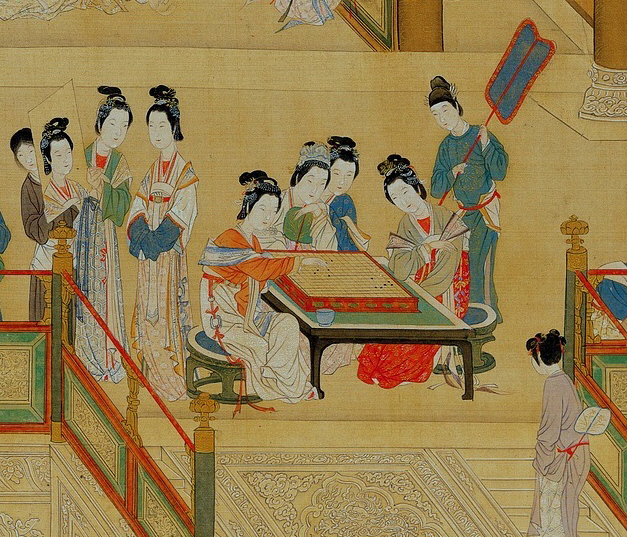
Weiqi at the Ming imperial court, 16th century

Another important treatise from the Song is Zhang Ni's Thirteen Chapters on the Go Classic (Qí Jīng Shísān Piān), which profoundly influenced later Weiqi theory and practice. During the Northern Song period, Li Yimin (李逸民) wrote extensively on Weiqi, including works like the Collection of Carefree Pure Joy (Wàng Yōu Qīng Lè Jí), Go Positions (Qí Shì), Subtleties (Zào Wēi), Essential Principles (Jīng Lǐ), and Secrets of Go (Qí Jué). The Collection of Carefree Pure Joy included the first collection of tsumegos (go problems). Northern Song literati and loyal officials such as Fan Zhongyan, Ouyang Xiu, Sima Guang, Wang Anshi, Su Shi, and Huang Tingjian also enjoyed playing weiqi. During the Yuan dynasty, Yan Defu (courtesy name Defu) and Yan Tianzhang compiled the Classic of the Mysterious and Profound (Xuánxuán Qí Jīng), collecting a vast number of theoretical writings, joseki, and set patterns (ding shi) from predecessors. The late Ming master Guo Bailing wrote the Manual of Endgame (Guānzǐ Pǔ), a compilation of various endgame techniques.

During the Song, Yuan, and Ming dynasties, several distinct weiqi cultures flourished. Elite gentlemen and officials wrote poetry and prose expressing their enjoyment of weiqi as a leisure activity, an art reflecting the patterns of the cosmos, and a form of self-cultivation. Players were expected to conduct themselves with proper behavior and demonstrate classical moral values, which was supposed to matter more than winning. In contrast, occupational weiqi players placed greater value on prestige acquired through winning games, or at least demonstrating their impressive skill and strategy. These occupational weiqi players earned their living by playing for crowds and receiving prizes, opening weiqi shops in marketplaces, traveling to the homes of wealthy families to teach weiqi, or by performing weiqi matches at the imperial court. There was also a contemporaneous culture of gambling on weiqi, in which players prioritized profits over prestige or classical morals; some gentlemen thus criticized weiqi as a harmful activity that could lead players down a path of financial and moral ruin. This culture of weiqi gambling became so pervasive that the Hongwu Emperor issued an "Edict Banning Weiqi" (Jìn Qí Lìng).

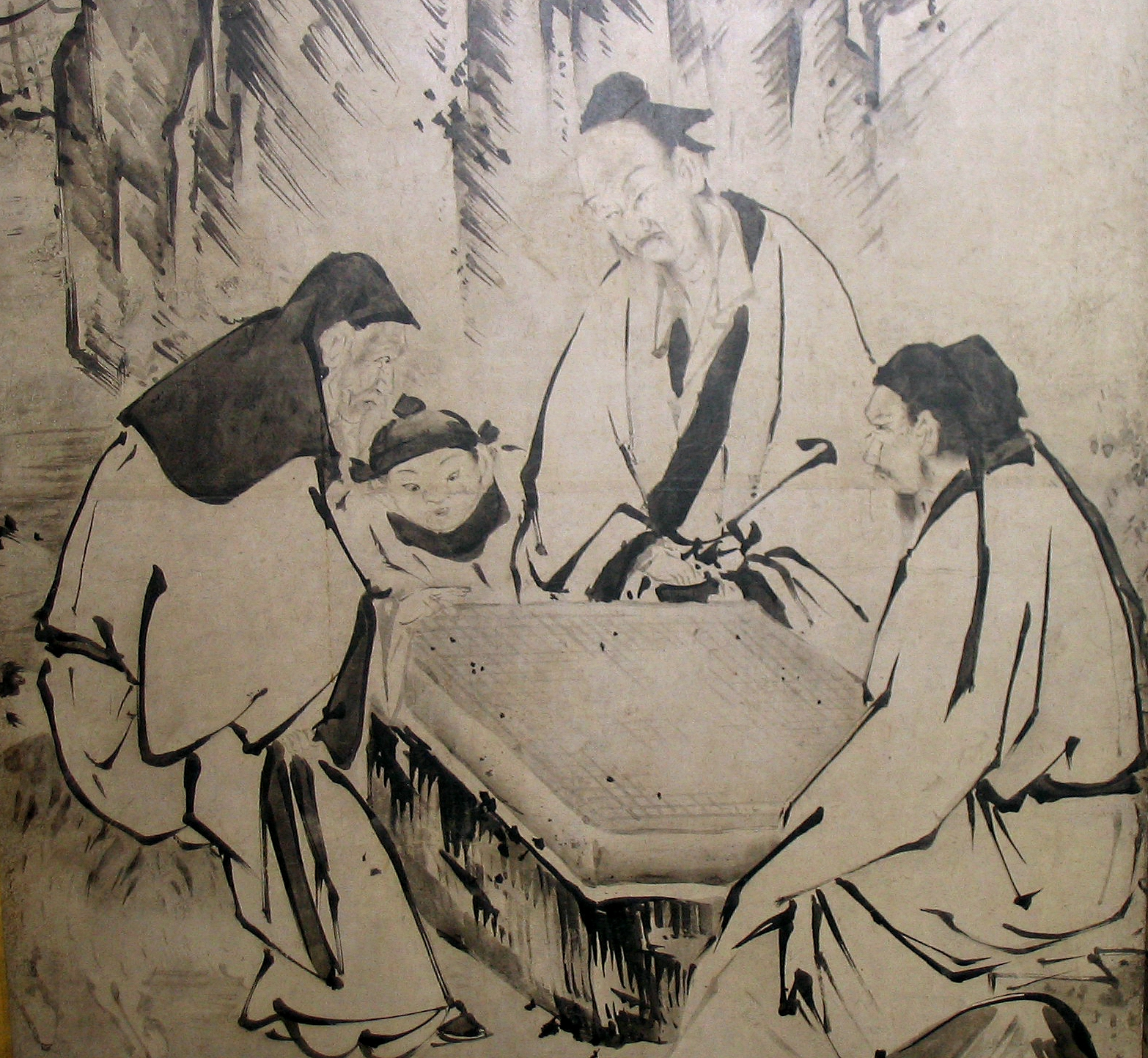
Chinese Go players during the Ming dynasty, depicted on a painted screen by a Japanese artist of the Kanō school. Momoyama period, 16th century.

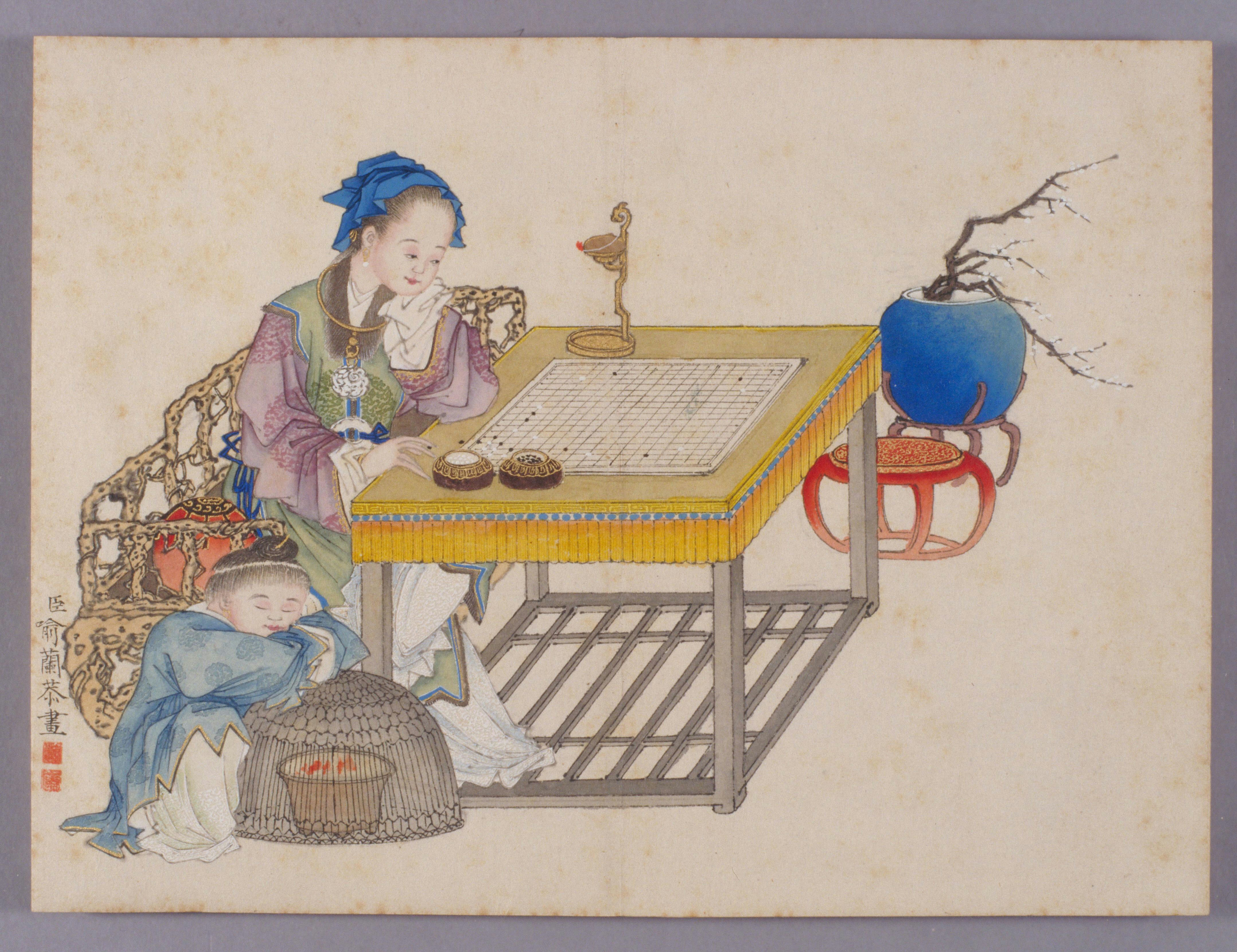
Yu Lan (1742–1809), "Playing Go Against Herself" (from his Album of Ladies' Elegant Amusements)

In spite of the decline of the game among elites, the Qing Dynasty also saw several Weiqi masters play some famous matches. Perhaps the strongest player of the Qing was Huang Longshi. Go Seigen is said to have seen Longshi as being on the same level as the great Japanese master Hon'inbō Dōsaku. During the Kangxi era, a famous ten-game match known as the "Blood and Tears Commentary" (Xuè Lèi Piān) was played between Huang Longshi, who gave a three-stone handicap to Xu Xingyou. In the fourth year of the Qianlong era (1739), Shi Xiangxia and Fan Xiping played the renowned "Ten Games at Danghu" (Dànghú Shí Jú) in Pinghu, Zhejiang.

The decline in the official status of weiqi from the golden age of the Tang left the economic income of top players during the Ming and Qing periods chronically unstable. Besides teaching Weiqi and instructing disciples, players' income primarily relied on "rewards" or "stakes" from spectators (mainly high officials, wealthy merchants, and upper-class literati). In peaceful and prosperous times when the nobility had leisure time, non-official Weiqi activities flourished, and players' lives were stable. Wang Xie, in the preface to Yì Mò (Ink on Go), described the vibrant Go scene of the early Qing as follows: "Masters vied for supremacy, playing not less than a thousand games," and "Several dozen national masters within the realm traveled between the Jiang and Huai rivers." However, in hard times, the livelihood of top players became very difficult. Thus, during the war torn late Qing, the standard of Weiqi play in China naturally gradually declined, and fewer top players emerged. Great players who were not wealthy lived a precarious lifestyle based on winnings from their games. While Weiqi itself remained a high art, players were often looked down upon as being on the same level as actors or fortune-tellers.

=== Go in Tibet and Mongolia ===
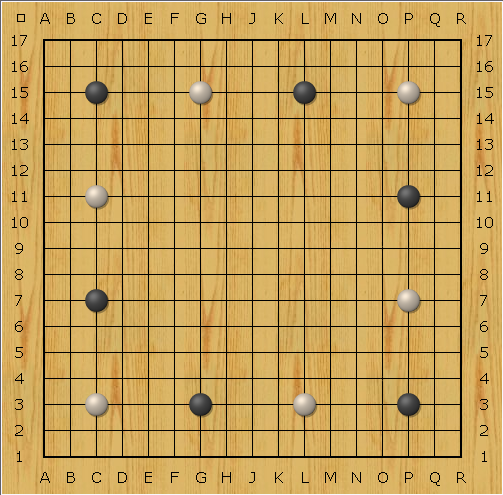
According to John Fairbairn (In the Go World Feature "Go in Tibet"), at least one version of Tibetan Go was played on a 17x17 board and began with this fixed stone placement.

The game of Go spread into Tibet and Mongolia by at least the early eighth century, a period when Chinese envoys described Tibetan raiders as engaging in gambling, trumpet playing, drumming, and Go. Archaeological finds, including boards and illustrations in Dunhuang, provide evidence of the game's diffusion along the Silk Road into Central Asia. Tibet in particular retained a preference for the 17×17 grid, even after the Chinese and Japanese traditions standardized the 19×19 board. These artifacts suggest that Go became deeply rooted in the social and religious life of the region. In Tibet, Go became known as mig-mangs, a term that may mean “many eyes” or refer to the board's chart-like pattern. The term also refers to a related board game (mig-mangs), or to a family of similar games.

Tibetan folklore contains numerous accounts linking Go to shamanic and Bon traditions. Legendary female spirits known as khadomas were said to play on natural stone boards, with rituals performed every twelve years on Mount Zari to commemorate their contests. Other stories describe rulers using Go to expose treachery, aided by the verbal jousting or “tongue fighting” that traditionally accompanied play. Within Bon cosmology, black and white stones represented cosmic forces of death and vitality, darkness and light, and the outcome of the game signified the condition of the universe rather than personal fate.

Because of these associations, Tibetan Buddhist monasteries often discouraged or forbade play, citing its connections to Bon ritual practice. Patterns formed by stones were sometimes used for divination, predicting events such as death. The epic hero Gesar is also said to have consulted Go before making military decisions, while parallel traditions among the Mongols and Manchus describe shamans casting Go stones into bowls of water or using them in visionary journeys to the underworld. Such practices indicate that the game functioned not only as entertainment but also as a cosmological tool in Central Asian religious culture.

Distinctive rules further set Tibetan Go and Mongolian Go apart from the East Asian standard. Games would begin with twelve larger (six of each color) “scarecrow” or “dog” stones placed along the corners and sides, symbolizing the months of the year and the layout of mythical cities such as Olmolungring, identified with Shambhala. In Lhasa, play was restricted to placements within two intersections of existing stones, and captures required a one-move delay. These variations, together with their ritual and symbolic functions, reflect a unique regional development of Go that blended recreation, divination, and cosmology across Tibet, Mongolia, and Siberia.

== History in Korea ==
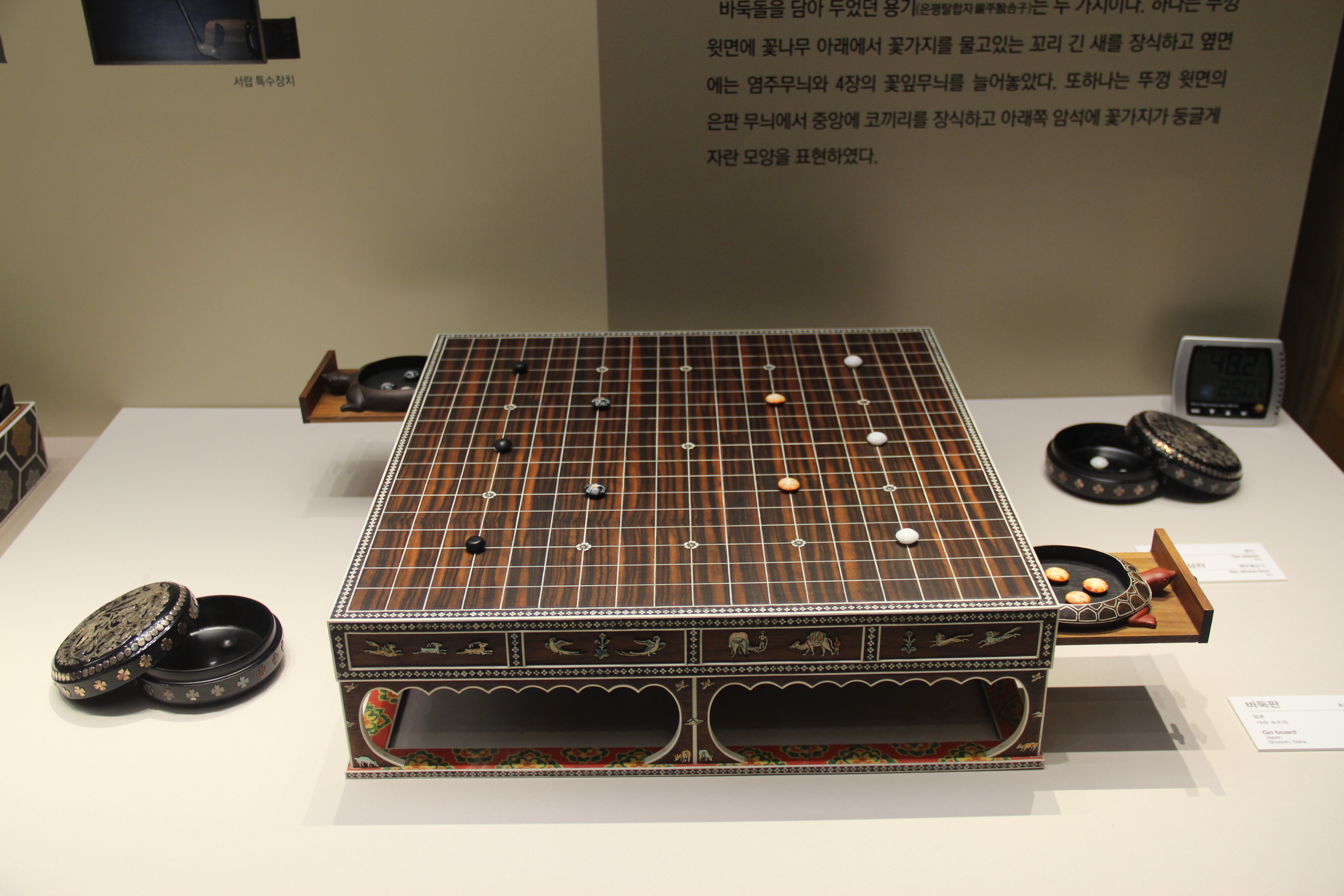
Reproduction of a Baduk board of the Baekje Kingdom. Seoul Baekje Museum, Seoul, Korea.

=== Ancient history ===
The origins of Go (known as baduk in Korean) in Korea remain uncertain, with two primary theories explaining its introduction from China. The first theory attributes the game's arrival to Qizi (Korean: Kija), a legendary Chinese sage who purportedly migrated to Korea during the time of Confucius. According to this account, Qizi brought various aspects of Chinese culture, including possibly the game of Weiqi / baduk, when he led his followers to Korea to escape political turmoil. The second theory suggests Go was introduced during Chinese colonization around 109 BCE, when Chinese cultural influence expanded in the Korean peninsula.

Archaeological and literary evidence supports Go's presence in Korean culture from an early period. The game appears in a poem from the Silla kingdom dated 737 CE, while a stone Go board from 880 CE at the Buddhist temple of Hae-in bears historical significance as it was reportedly used by the renowned scholar Ch'oe Ch'i-weon. Notably, several Go sets preserved in the Imperial Repository in Nara, Japan, are believed to be of Korean origin and predate these Korean artifacts, suggesting an active tradition of Go craftsmanship on the Korean peninsula.

Historical accounts from the Three Kingdoms period illustrate Baduk's strategic and political significance. During the rivalry between Goguryeo and Baekje kingdoms, a Goguryeo priest named To-lim employed the game as part of an elaborate espionage scheme. Pretending to defect to Baekje after facing false accusations, To-lim gained the trust of King Yogyong, who was known to love Go. Using this relationship, To-lim influenced the king and his successor to engage in costly construction projects, weakening Baekje's finances. After gathering intelligence on the kingdom's vulnerabilities, To-lim returned to Goguryeo, enabling King Koryon's successful invasion of Baekje in 475 CE in what is now the Seoul area.

=== Traditional Korean Go: Sunjang Baduk ===
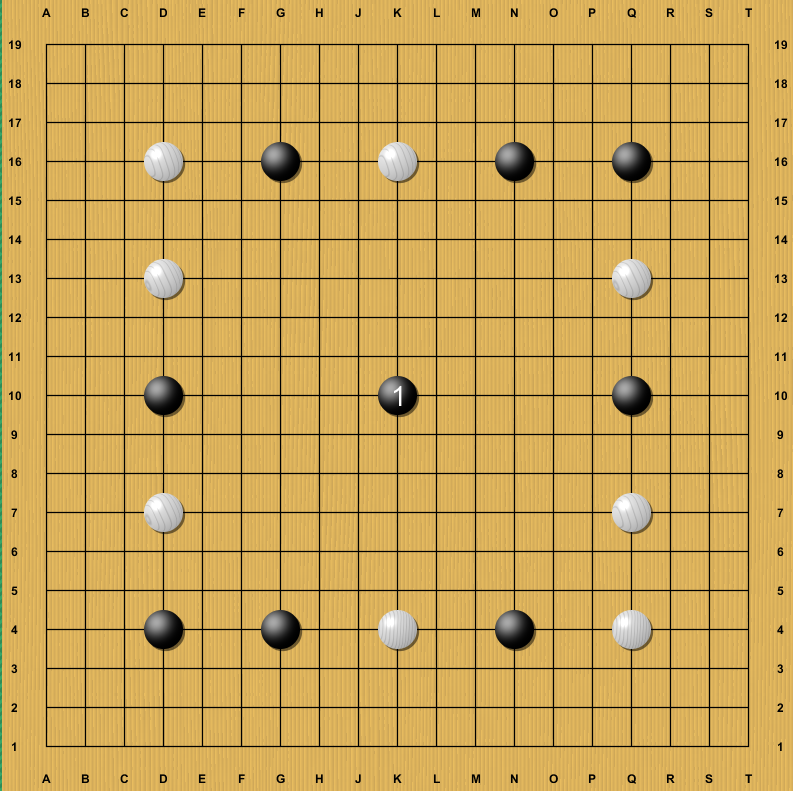
Traditional Sunjang baduk starting position

Korea developed its own distinctive variant of Go known as Sunjang baduk (순장바둑), which flourished from the late 16th century and may represent one of the forms closest to the game's original version. This traditional Korean variant differed significantly from the well known Chinese and Japanese forms and continued to be played until its apparent disappearance around 1937, when the final recorded game was played between No Sa-ch'o and Ch'ae Keuk-mun.

The term "sunjang" itself reflects the uncertainty surrounding the game's precise nature, as it can be written in different character combinations with varying interpretations. The most common rendering, meaning "touring officers," suggests either a military context where guards moved between posts (mirroring strategic positioning on the board), or refers to the ritual placement of starting stones on 17 designated points around the board, traditionally called "guard points" rather than the more common "flower points." An alternative interpretation, "following one's seniors," may reflect connections to the hierarchical administrative systems of the time.

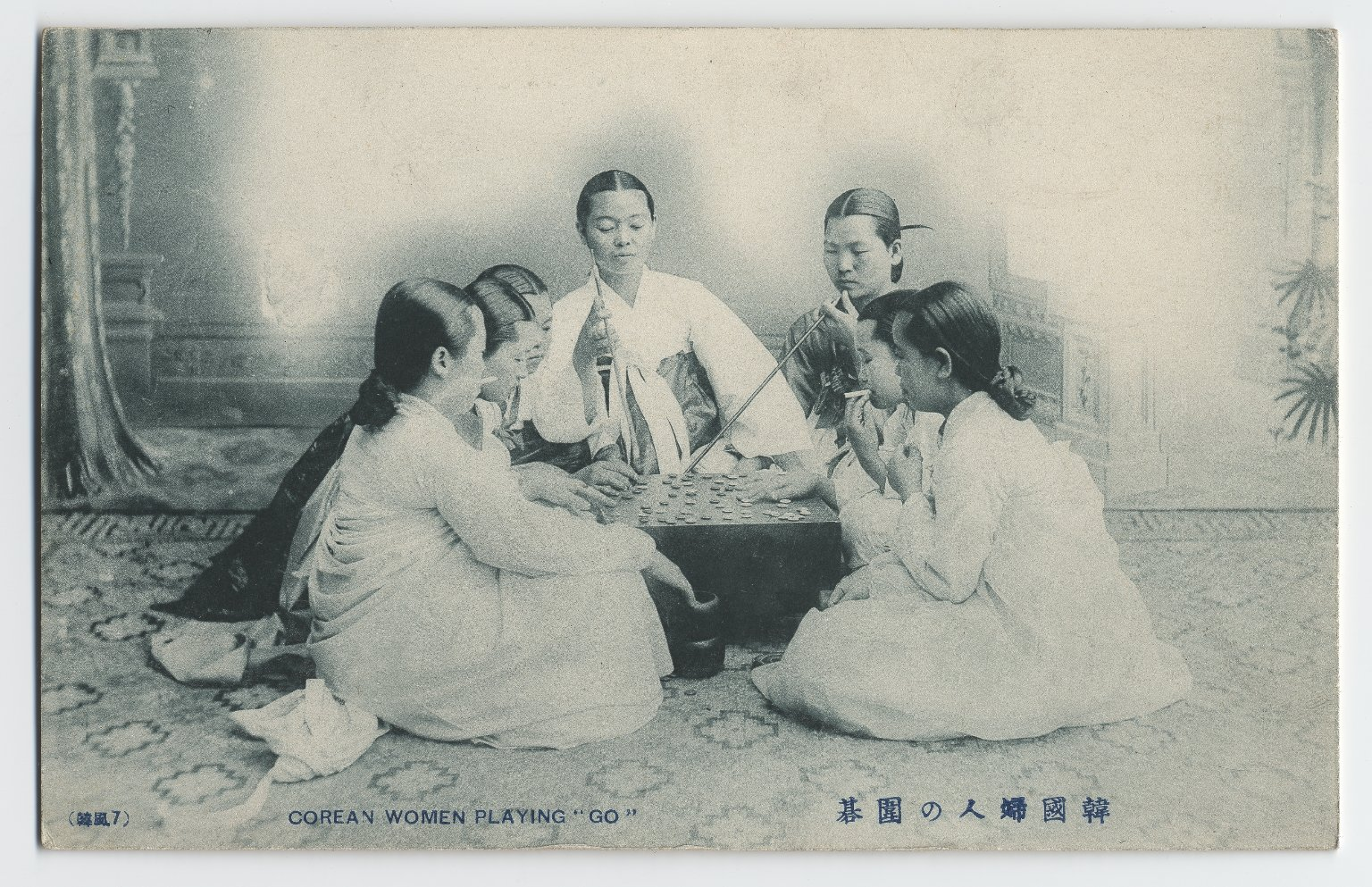
Korean women playing baduk in 1904

Sunjang baduk was played on specially marked boards, several of which survive today. The game began with both players placing eight stones each on predetermined points, followed by Black placing a ninth stone at the center to commence play. Unlike similar starting arrangements in Tibetan Go, these initial stones held no special status beyond establishing the strategic framework. The counting system in Sunjang baduk was also notably different from other variants. Games continued until all dame (neutral points) were filled, as these could contribute to the final score. Prisoners were disregarded entirely. To determine the winner, all dead stones were first removed, then all stones not forming part of the minimum outside wall were eliminated. Victory was determined by comparing territorial totals, with local variations sometimes altering standard victory conditions or treating ties differently.

Historically, Sunjang baduk was also associated with gambling and was particularly valued for testing players' skills in complex life-and-death situations. The game experienced a brief revival in the digital age when enthusiasts organized tournaments on the Online Go Server between 2013 and 2015, introducing its unique strategies to contemporary players.

== History in Japan ==
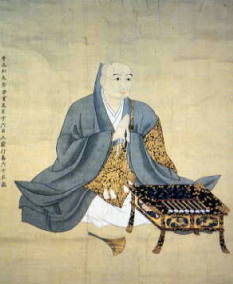
Hon'inbō Sansa (1559–1623), a Nichiren Buddhist priest, was one of the strongest Japanese Go players of the Edo period and the founder Hon'inbō school of Go.

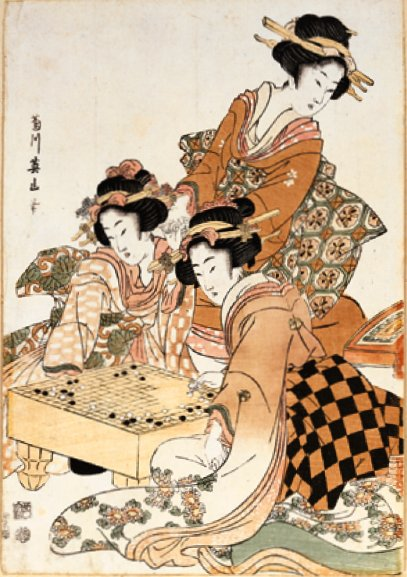
Japanese women in traditional kimonos playing go, a print from the 18th century.

=== Early period ===
Go is believed to have been introduced to Japan by Kibi no Makibi (695–775) who had studied in Tang China at the beginning of the 8th century. But the Taihō Code, enacted in 701 CE, has a description of Go and therefore the game may have been introduced slightly earlier, possibly from Korea. The approximate period can be confirmed by the Middle Chinese pronunciation 圍棋 *ɦʉi ɡɨ, which was loaned into Old Japanese as *wigə/wigo_{2} (= man'yōgana 井碁), later becoming the modern Japanese mixed kan-on/go-on reading 囲碁 igo.

After it was introduced (from either Korea or China), Go came to be actively played during the Nara period (710–794 CE), and during the following Heian period (794–1185 CE) Go became a favourite aristocratic pastime, as is described in classic Heian literary works such as The Pillow Book and The Tale of Genji. During the Heian, skill in Go came to be considered to be a mark of aristocratic refinement.

During the Muromachi period (1336–1573), Go playing, which had previously been enjoyed mainly by the nobility and religious elite, also spread among the samurai class, and commoners. Influential feudal lords also employed Go teachers and semi-professional Go players, called Go-uchi (碁打ち) or Jouzu (上手) to compete against other clans in Go matches. With the onset of the Sengoku (Warring States) period, Go was widely enjoyed by samurai as an intellectual war simulation. Records remain of many Sengoku daimyō being fond of Go, including Takeda Shingen (1521–1573).

This era also saw the transition from games starting with several stones already placed on the board to beginning with a completely empty board. Consequently, it can be said that the concept of different opening strategies (fuseki) began to develop at this time. At the end of the 16th century, the monk Nikkai (Hon'inbō Sansa) served Oda Nobunaga, Toyotomi Hideyoshi and Tokugawa Ieyasu as a Go teacher. Nobunaga had once called him a Meijin (Great Expert), and this unofficial sobriquet would later become an important title for Go masters in Japan. Hideyoshi also organized the first Japanese Go tournament in 1588. Hon'inbō won and was granted a salary by Hideyoshi. Hon'inbō was later granted the official title of Godokoro by Tokugawa Ieyasu, making him the official government head of the Japanese Go world and the Shogun's Go teacher. Hon'inbō also founded the first major school of Go, the Honinbō house, becoming the first Hon'inbō (head of the school).

The period from the Sengoku era into the Edo period was one of dramatic improvement in Japanese Go. Records remain of victories against the visiting Korean player Yi Huak (Yi O, 李礿) even while he enjoyed a three-stone handicap. A three-stone difference in modern terms is akin to the gap between a top professional and a prefectural-level amateur representative.

=== Edo Golden Age ===
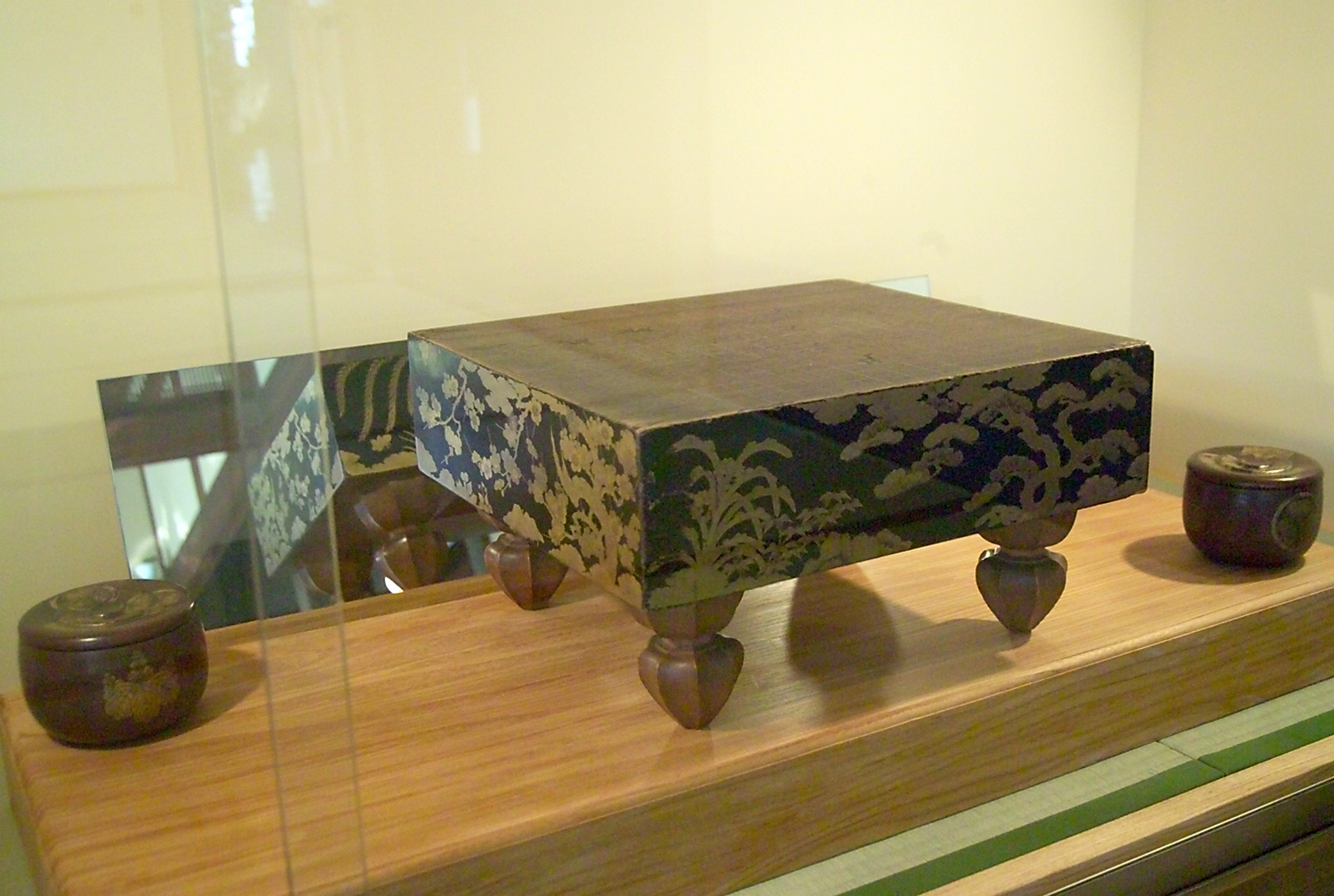
A maki-e Go board at Daitoku-ji, Kyoto which was said to be used by Toyotomi Hideyoshi and Tokugawa Ieyasu. The bowls to the left and right of the board bear their family crests.

In 1612, at the beginning of the Edo period (1603–1868), the Tokugawa shogunate established Four hereditary "houses" to teach the game of Go: Hon'inbō (本因坊, Hon'inbō), Hayashi (林, Hayashi), Inoue (井上, Inoue) and Yasui (安井, Yasui). These four houses (which trained students in the iemoto manner by having them live with a master) competed with each other throughout the 300 years of the Edo period. The four houses received stipends from the Shogunate, trained students, and developed unique strategies. Each school had different entrance requirements. The Hon'inbō school required one to become a Buddhist monk for example. After one entered one of these schools, the training was extensive and fierce. The headmasters were mostly determined by skill rather than bloodline (though lineage also had some influence). The key arena for demonstrating the skill and prestige of the Go schools was the annual Castle Games (Oshirogo), held before the shogun himself in Edo Castle. The Castle Games were fought by several representatives from each house, and losing brought great disgrace to a house, affecting its ability to attract disciples.

The top players also competed for the position of Meijin Godokoro, the head of the Go world, which was always held by the head of one of the houses. The Godokoro held numerous privileges, including the authority to issue dan ranks to other players, and great prestige, leading to fierce struggles for the position among the houses on multiple occasions. These disputes were settled through matches called Sōgo or Arasoigo (Challenge Matches). The first such challenge match in history was fought between the second Hon'inbō head, San'etsu, and the second Yasui head, Sanchi. It was sparked by a dispute over the handicap (teaiwari) in a Castle Game. It lasted nine years over six games, ending tied 3-3 upon San'etsu's death. The intense competition in the Japanese Go world during this period lead to a rapid increase in the level of play and in the strength of Japanese Go players.

Ten years after San'etsu's death, Sanchi assumed the position of Meijin Godokoro. However, Dōsetsu, San'etsu's disciple who had become the third Hon'inbō, objected, and another challenge match began. Dōsetsu, daring to defy the shogunate's will, embarked on this match prepared for exile or even death. After 20 games, with Dōsetsu leading 12 wins, 4 losses, and 4 jigo (draws), the match was called off, and Meijin Sanchi announced his retirement. Dōsetsu, stating "It is fearful to have opposed the shogunate's decision," also retired, passing leadership to his disciple Dōsaku. Dōsaku's skill was already said to surpass Dōsetsu's at that time, and it is widely believed that Dōsetsu's strong performance in the latter half of the match was largely due to collaborative research with Dōsaku.

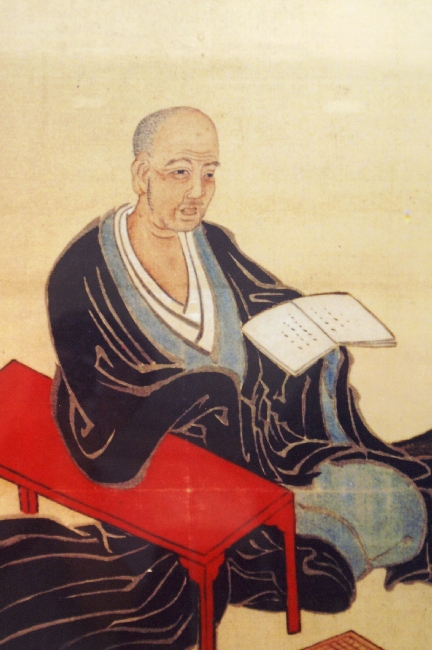
Hon'inbō Dōsaku, the strategist "Go Saint" who was at the forefront of modern Go theory.

The fourth Hon'inbō, Dōsaku (1645–1702), overwhelmingly defeated all the top players of his time, reducing them all to receiving handicaps, and was praised as having "thirteen-dan strength." He introduced the use of pincer josekis, sacrifices and strategies that ranged across the entire board. He developed new techniques to analyze games (such as tewari, "removing extraneous stones and playing the order of moves in reverse to find inefficient moves"). He assumed the position of Meijin unquestioned. During this era, the Hon'inbō house became the foremost of the four schools. Under Dōsaku, talented players from across Japan gathered, but perhaps due to the harsh training, many died young. Among them, Hon'inbō Dōteki was said to be already on par with his teacher Dōsaku at age 19 and is considered the greatest prodigy in Japanese Go history. However, Dōteki died tragically at the young age of 21. In his later years, Dōsaku found another talent of comparable ability in Hon'inbō Dōchi and made him his successor. Dōchi also later became Meijin Godokoro.

After Dōchi, the headmasters of the Hon'inbō house remained at 6-dan strength for three generations, and the house entered a period of stagnation. However, the ninth Hon'inbō head, Satetsu, overpowered the other houses to become Meijin after a long interval, bringing a revival to the Hon'inbō house. Also, the seventh Yasui head, Yasui Senchi (Daisenchi), was also recognized as having a brilliant and bold style focused on the center of the board and exerted great influence on later generations.

From the late 18th to early 19th century, there was a famous rivalry between the eleventh Hon'inbō head, Genjō, and the eighth Yasui head, Chitoku. The two played over 80 games against each other with nearly even results. These two were hailed as the greatest rivals of the Edo period. Along with the later eleventh Inoue head, Inseki Gennan, and the fourteenth Hon'inbō head, Shūwa, they are known as the "Four Go Sages" (Igo no Shitetsu), players who possessed Meijin-level strength but never became Meijin.

The twelfth Hon'inbō head, Jōwa, was also a top-level player. He vied with his rival, Inseki Gennan, head of the Inoue house, for the position of Godokoro and used various political maneuvers to assume the title of Meijin, leaving a negative reputation for posterity. When the fact that his promotion had been secured through shady means was revealed, he was forced to resign. However, his playing strength is still considered among the greatest in history. A highlight of Edo Go history was a match hosted by the Matsudaira family in 1840, where he counterattacked Inseki's prized disciple, Akaboshi Intetsu (sent as a challenger), with a series of brilliant tesujis. The game took a week to play and was so intense that Akaboshi collapsed from exhaustion and vomited blood, dying shortly after. This incident made this match famous in Go history, and it is now called the blood-vomiting game.

After Jōwa's retirement, Inseki Gennan still coveted the title of Meijin, but he was resisted by the young genius of the Hon'inbō school, Hon'inbō Shūwa, who defeated Inseki in the Castle Games, thwarting his ambition. Shūwa is often thought to be among the strongest players in history, but by the time he sought the Meijin title, the country was entering the turbulent Bakumatsu (late Edo) period, and the Tokugawa shogunate was in no state to concern itself with Go.

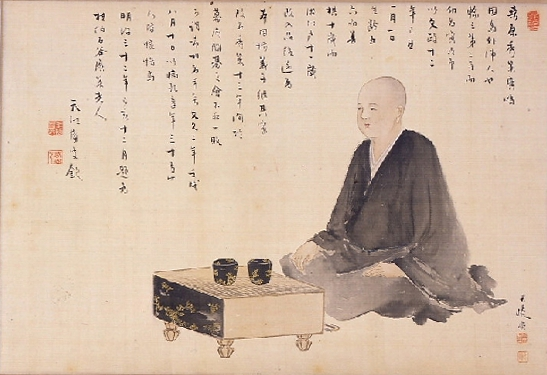
Shūsaku

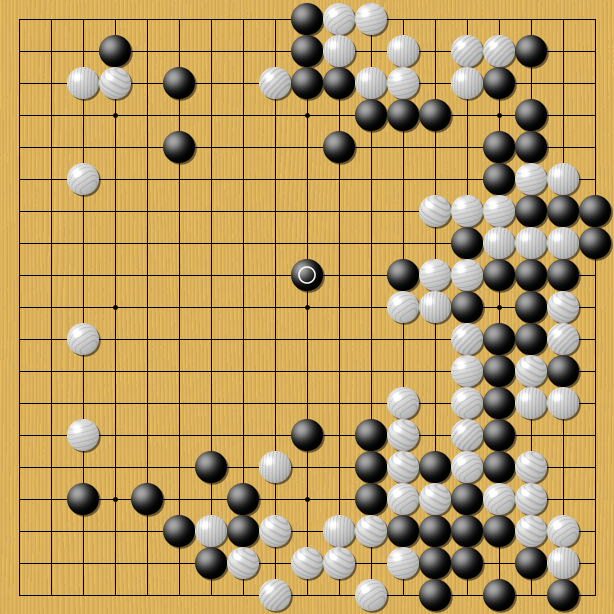
The famous "ear reddening move" of Shusaku (black plays the center), which reportedly made Inseki Gennan's ear turn red.

Hon'inbō Shūsaku, a disciple of Shūwa, demonstrated great talent from a young age and came to achieve a great record of 19 wins and 0 losses in the Castle Games but died young of cholera at age 34. Hon'inbō Jōwa called Shūsaku "the greatest talent to appear in 150 years", and today he is considered to be one of the greatest players of all time. His games are still studied by aspiring Go players. Shūsaku's most famous game is the ear-reddening game against the senior Inseki Gennan.

Shūwa, Shūsaku, and Shūsaku's junior fellow disciple, Murase Shūho (later Hon'inbō Shūho), are collectively called the "Three Excellencies" (Sanshū). They are considered the pinnacle of Edo period Go.

During the Edo period, not only samurai but also merchants and wealthy farmers throughout the country often invited professional players for games and sponsored competitions. As depicted in rakugo stories like "Kasa Go" (The Hat Go Game) and "Go-uchi Nusutto" (The Go-Playing Thief), it was actively played even among commoners. Indeed, many great players rose from the commoner class. Common folk often played in Go parlors in the pleasure districts (ukiyo) of cities, where the classes mixed freely. Go gambling was also common. Because of this, in some regions, Go was viewed alongside games like sugoroku as gambling game, and bans were sometimes issued against the practice.

== Modern history of Go in East Asia ==
=== Modern Japan ===
The wave of Westernization and modernization accompanying the Meiji Restoration in 1868 caused the dissolution of the official Go system supported by the Tokugawa Shogunate. Go became associated with the old elite culture of the Tokugawa and became less popular. Many Go masters, having lost their livelihoods, struggled to make a living. For example, Hon'inbō Shūwa lived in poverty, at one point even residing in a warehouse and only making ends meet through tuition fees. Murase Shūho meanwhile, initially wandered the countryside in poverty.

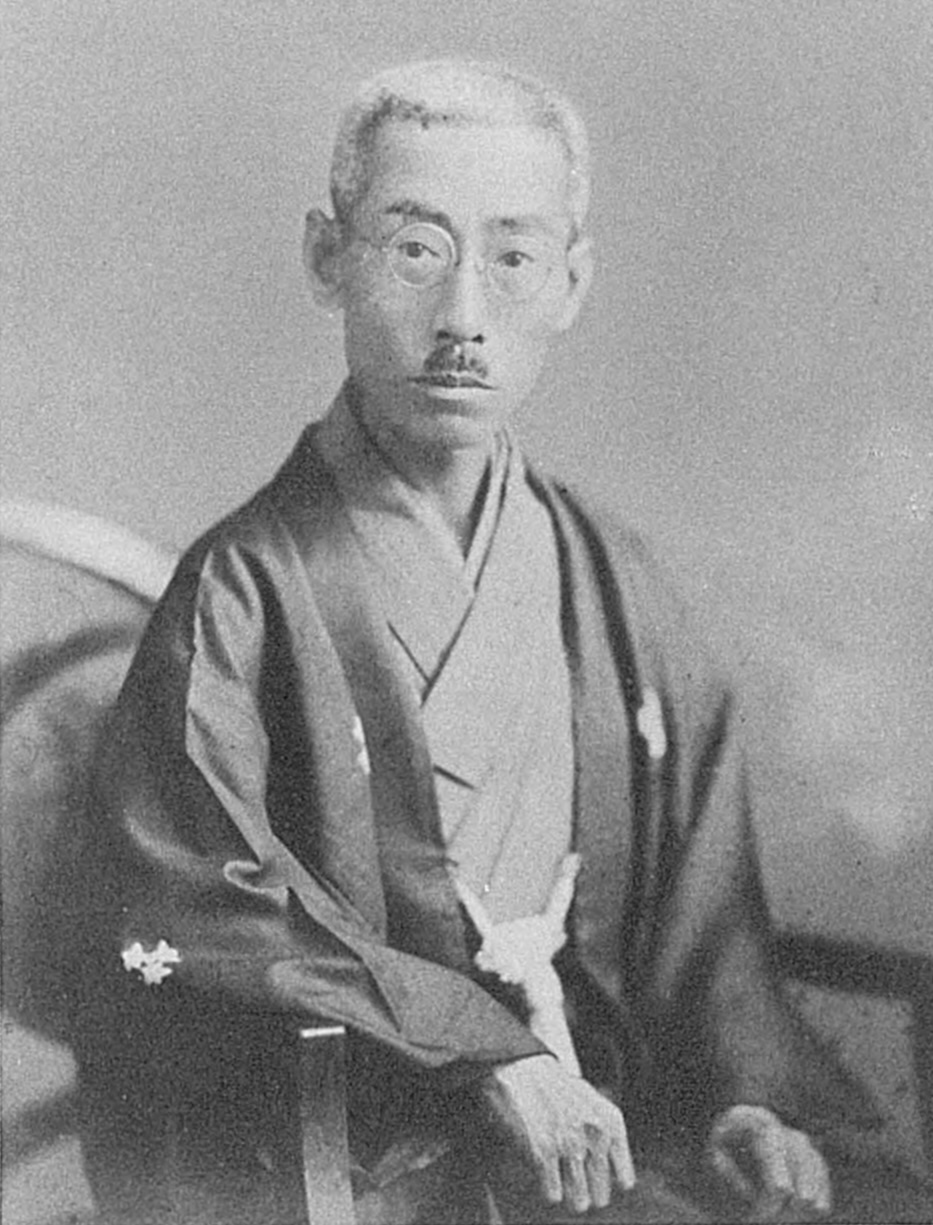
Hon'inbō Shūsai

Determined to promote Go culture, Murase Shūho established the Go association "Hoensha" (Square and Circle Society). It attempted to broaden the game's base by adopting the new kyū ranks under dan ranks. In opposition, Tsuchiya Shūei (later Hon'inbō Shūei), son of Shūwa, established the "Go Encouragement Society" (囲碁奨励会) in 1892. Thus, the era of rivalry between the Hon'inbō house (Hō) and Hoensha (Sha) continued until 1886, when Shūei yielded the position of Hon'inbō to Shūho, reconciling. However, Shūho died just one month later, and Shūei returned as Hon'inbō. Spurred by this competitive fervor, Go columns began appearing in newspapers, increasing public interest. Shūei, upon his return as Hon'inbō, overwhelmed all other players and assumed the title of Meijin in 1906. After his death, Tamura Yasutoshi (later Hon'inbō Shūsai) and Karigane Jun'ichi contended for the position of top Go player. Ultimately, Shūei's younger brother, Hon'inbō Shūgen, temporarily assumed the title of the 20th Hon'inbō.

After the Great Kantō Earthquake struck in 1923, calls grew to unify the Japanese Go associations into a single umbrella. At the call of Ōkura Kishichirō, players from eastern and western Japan gathered, and the Nihon Ki-in (Japan Go Association) was established in 1924. The association reformed Go rankings further, which was now based on an open tournament (the Oteai) accessible to all players through an equitable system that also distributed prize money (sponsored by newspapers). Modern Japanese Go associations, especially the Nihon Ki-in, were instrumental in popularizing the game among the rising middle classes and seeking out corporate sponsorship for games and tournaments. They also developed new rules, such as the komi rule (set points given to a player in order to compensate for the disadvantage of playing second) and key elements of tournament play, such as how to time games, breaks and handicapping. This era thus saw the birth of modern professional Go with its modern tournament and rank systems.

Shortly after the founding of the Nihon Ki-in, a group of players seceded to form the Kiseisha (Go Justice Society), leading to a rivalry match against the Nihon Ki-in (the In-Sha Rivalry Match). The game between Hon'inbō Shūsai Meijin and Karigane Jun'ichi published in the newspapers became hugely popular. It is said this caused the circulation of the Yomiuri Shinbun to quadruple.

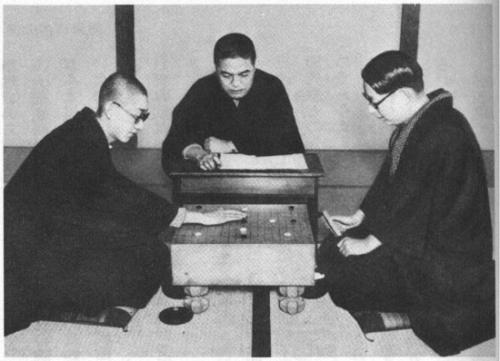
Go Seigen and Kitani Minoru playing

The 1930s saw the rise of numerous popular Go tournaments, including the Hon'inbō Tournament. The hereditary Hon'inbō system was abolished, and Shūsai transferred the Hon'inbō title to the Nihon Ki-in, who held the first tournaments in 1936.

One of the most famous players during the 30s was a genius player from Fujian, China, Go Seigen (Chinese name: Wu Qingyuan). In 1939, he defeated many Japanese pros and became a sensation. Together with his friend Kitani Minoru, Go Seigen revolutionized Go opening strategy (fuseki). This was called the "Shin Fuseki" (New Opening Theory), which placed one stone in a corner (4-4) as was traditional and then immediately moved to take the center of the board. They also developed the sanrensei fuseki, "in which the first three stones are placed on two 4-4 and the 4-10 points on one side." These new opening theories swept the Go world and led to further innovations in Go strategy.

Game record of the Game of the Century, Go Seigen (black) vs Shūsai (white).

In a 1933 game against Meijin Shūsai, perhaps the most famous game of this era, Go Seigen astonished the Go world by opening with an extremely novel opening pattern at the three-three, star, and center points. This was seen as insulting by the traditionalist followers of Shūsai. The game, which lasted three months, became famously known as the game of the century. Shūsai would often adjourn the game and retreat home to study the game with his students, and it was rumored that the move which saved him was an idea of one of his students. The controversy and public attention to this game made it one of the most famous Go matches in history. Honinbo Shūsai also played another famous game with Minoru Kitani, which was popularized in the novel The Master of Go by Yasunari Kawabata. Shūsai lost by a few points and surrendered his Honinbo title to the Nihon Ki-in, dying a few months later as the last figure of a classic Go dynasty.

With the outbreak of the Pacific War, players were forced to evacuate to the countryside, traveling around for games. The Nihon Ki-in building was also completely burned down in an air raid, and the office was temporarily moved to the home of player Iwamoto Kaoru. Despite this, the Hon'inbō Tournament continued. The second game of the 3rd Hon'inbō match (Hashimoto Utaro vs. Iwamoto Kaoru) on August 6, 1945, was held in the suburbs of Hiroshima. During the game, they were hit by the blast of the atomic bomb. Both players were blown away, and the stones scattered, but the game was played to completion. This game is known as the "Game Under the Atomic Bomb." After the war, for a while, the Nihon Ki-in held games at rented spaces like restaurants around Tokyo. But calls grew for their own playing venue, leading to the opening of the Ki-in Kaikan in Takanawa, Minato Ward, in 1947.

From before the war until 1956, Go Seigen played a series of ten-game matches (jūbango), sponsored by the Yomiuri Shinbun, against top players of the era like Kitani Minoru, Fujisawa Kōsai (Hosai), and Sakata Eio, winning them all. In 1950, he was awarded the 9-dan rank (then synonymous with Meijin, though it no longer carries that meaning). He was called the "Sage of Go of the Shōwa Era." However, during the period these Jūbango were held, Go Seigen did not appear in title matches like the Hon'inbō, Ōza, or Jūdan tournaments, creating an anomalous situation where the strongest player did not hold any titles.

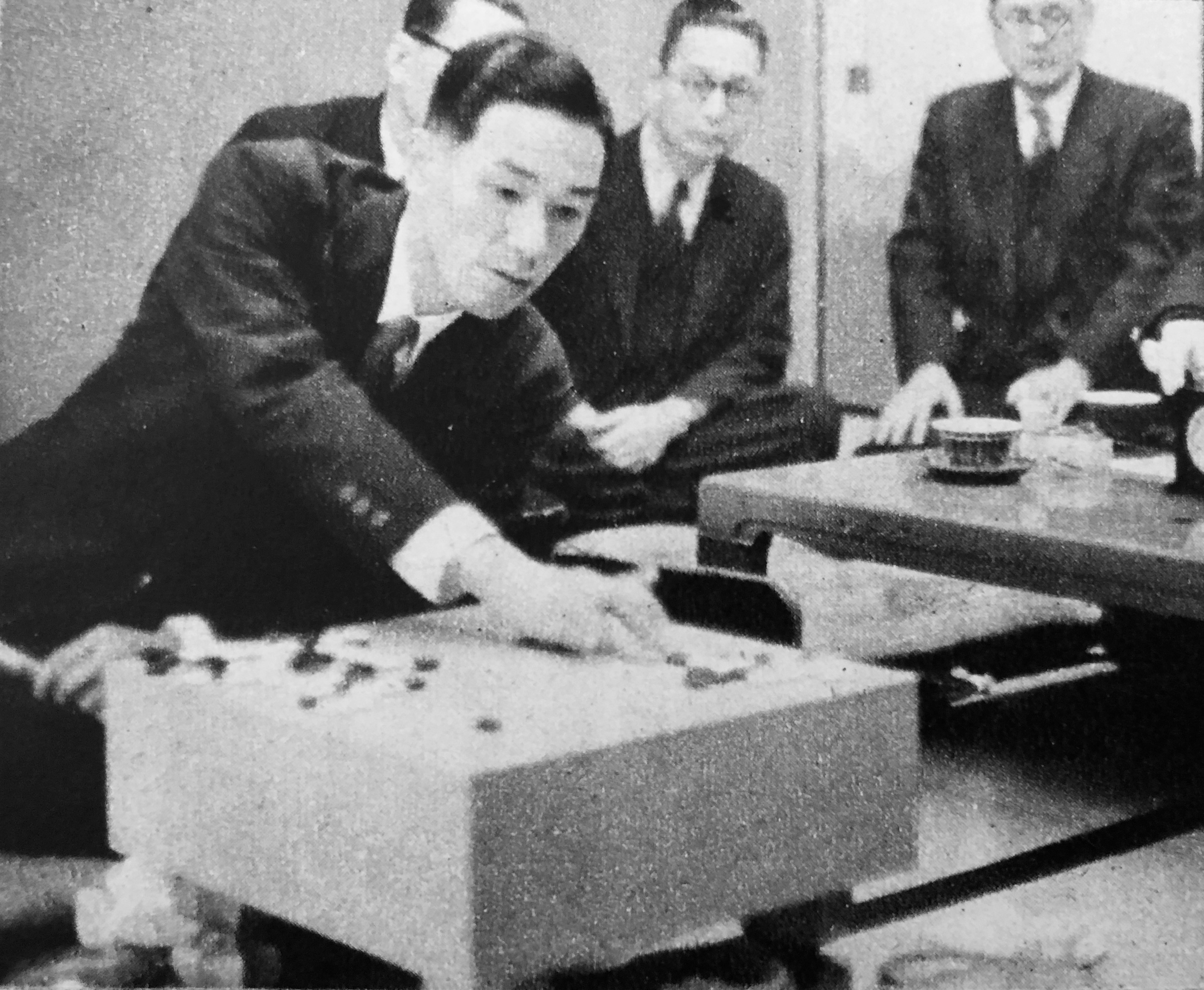
Sakata in 1955

After the war, several Go tournaments were established or renewed. The Ōza title was established in 1953, the Jūdan in 1956, and the Meijin title (as a new tournament) in 1962. Newspaper Go also became centered around title matches (Go Seigen also participated in these from the 1962 onward). Along with this trend, games with komi (point compensation for playing second) became standard. After Go Seigen was involved in a traffic accident in 1961 which greatly affected his health, he was superseded as the dominant player in Japan by Sakata Eio and Fujisawa Shūkō (who won the Meijin title in the 1962 tournament). Sakata later took the Hon'inbō title from Takagawa Kaku and held it for seven consecutive terms. He also won the Meijin title from Fujisawa Shūkō in the 2nd tournament in 1963. That year, he achieved an astounding record of 30 wins and 2 losses, monopolizing all major titles except the Judan.

Sakata's dominance was challenged by the Taiwanese Rin Kaiho (Lin Haifeng) who took Meijin title from Sakata in 1965. Furthermore, Ōtake Hideo, another disciple of Kitani Minoru, emerged to rival Rin, creating the "Take-Rin" (Bamboo Forest) era. Other disciples of Kitani Minoru also began to flourish during this period, including Ishida Yoshio, Kato Masao, and Takemiya Masaki, who became known as the "Three Crows of Kitani." Subsequently, until the 1990s, a golden age for the "Kitani school" continued, with their disciples vying for titles amongst themselves. During this period, Fujisawa Shūkō carved out his own space, achieving six consecutive Kisei titles in his 50s, among other feats.

In 1974, the "Meijin Incident" erupted when the Meijin tournament, sponsored by the Yomiuri Shinbun, moved to the Asahi Shinbun. This triggered a review of the prize money for all tournaments, which had remained stagnant for years despite inflation. Consequently, the Tengen title was established in 1975, and the Kisei and Gosei titles in 1976, completing the current lineup of the Seven Major Titles. The next players to define the era after the Three Crowns were, once again, two Kitani disciples: the Korean player Cho Chikun (Jo Chikun) and Kobayashi Koichi. Cho first rose to prominence, achieving the "Big Three Crowns" (Kisei, Meijin, and Hon'inbō titles) in 1983. In 1987, astonished the scene by achieving the "Grand Slam" (winning all seven major titles at least once, though not simultaneously). Kobayashi, who started his rise slightly later, took the Kisei and Meijin titles from Cho, achieving eight and seven consecutive titles respectively. Kobayashi had numerous chances to achieve the Big Three Crowns if he could also win the Hon'inbō, but each time he was thwarted by Cho. Cho achieved an unprecedented ten consecutive Hon'inbō titles from 1989 and won a total of 75 titles (the most in history).

During the early 21st century, Cho U, Takao Shinji, Yamashita Keigo, and Hane Naoki, known as the "Four Heavenly Kings of the Heisei Era", were the strongest players in Japan. Later in 2016, Iyama Yūta achieved the unprecedented feat of holding all seven major titles simultaneously, reigning as the undisputed top player. The number of young Go players continued to decline during this time. A temporary increase occurred due to the Go boom sparked by the manga Hikaru no Go (later a TV anime) serialized in Weekly Shōnen Jump from 1998 to 2003. But after the boom subsided, the youth player population began to decrease again.

=== Modern Korean Go ===
The transformation of Korean Go began in the mid-20th century, initially under Japanese influence during the colonial period. Korean players frequently studied in Japan to improve their skills, with Cho Namchul becoming the first Korean to pass the Japanese Go Association's professional examinations in April 1941 after studying at the prestigious Kitani school. Cho engaged in an intense fifteen year rivalry with the homegrown master So Pung-su.

The Korea Baduk Association (Hankuk Kiwon) was established on January 28, 1954, marking the formal organization of Korean Go. During this time, traditional Sunjang baduk was still more popular with the people however, who saw Japanese rules Go as a foreign imposition. A pivotal moment came in 1963 when seven-year-old Cho Chikun left Korea to study at the Kitani school in Japan, attaining the Meijin title there. His subsequent success, winning numerous international titles, made him a national hero upon his return to Korea and significantly boosted the popularity of the Go using the empty starting position and Japanese rules.

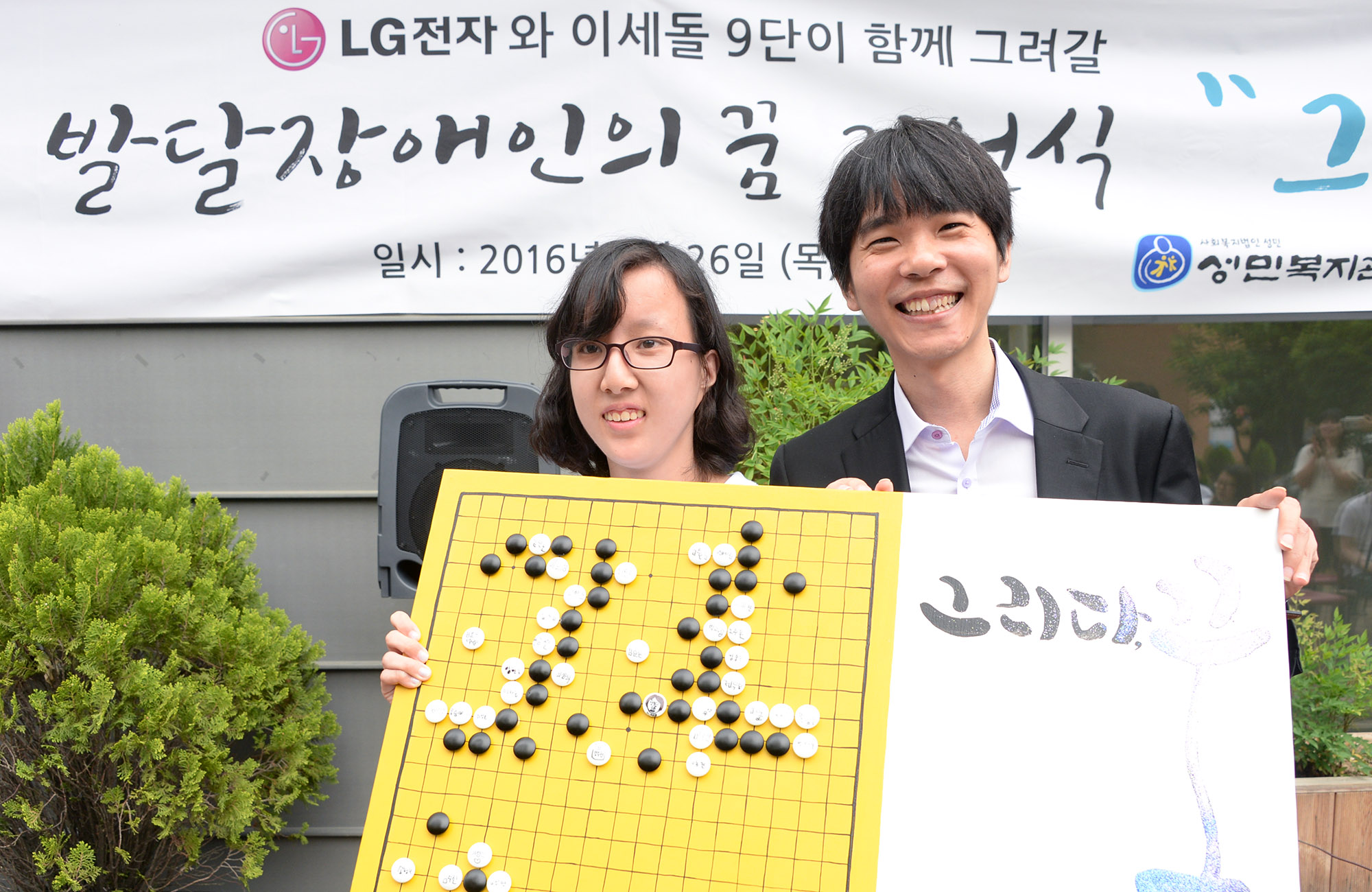
Lee Sedol at an LG tournament

The 1980s marked Korea's emergence as a modern Go powerhouse. In September 1989, Cho Hun-hyun, another Kitani school graduate who had been dominating the Korean Go scene in the 80s, won $400,000 at the inaugural Ing Cup, signaling Korea's arrival on the international Go stage. This success was followed by the rise of “The Stone Buddha” Lee Changho, Cho Hun-hyun's student, who became one of the most dominant players in Go history. Another famous Korean player is Lee Sedol, who is internationally known for his matches against Google's Go computer program AlphaGo.

Throughout the 1990s and beyond, Korean players have maintained their dominance in international competitions, becoming renowned for their aggressive middle-game fighting style. Korean Go has also contributed to the game's globalization, with the Korea Baduk Association helping foreign players achieve professional status, including American Janice Kim (1987), Russians Alexandre Dinerchtein and Svetlana Shikshina (2002), and Hungarian Diána Kőszegi (2008).

In February 2000, Chinese-born Rui Naiwei became the first woman to win a major international title while representing Korea, further demonstrating Korean Go's progressive influence on the global game.

=== Modern China and international competition in Asia ===
The chaos of the 19th and 20th centuries and the numerous wars on the mainland meant that Go did not thrive in China during this time. During this period following the disintegration of the Qing dynasty, one key figure in Chinese Go was the warlord Duan Qirui. Duan was a big fan of Go and loved playing with the best players he could find and promoted the game in Shanghai, which developed a serious Go scene in the 1930s. Duan also sent several top Chinese players to Japan for study. It was also during this time that the Japanese rule of starting the game with an open board was adopted in China.

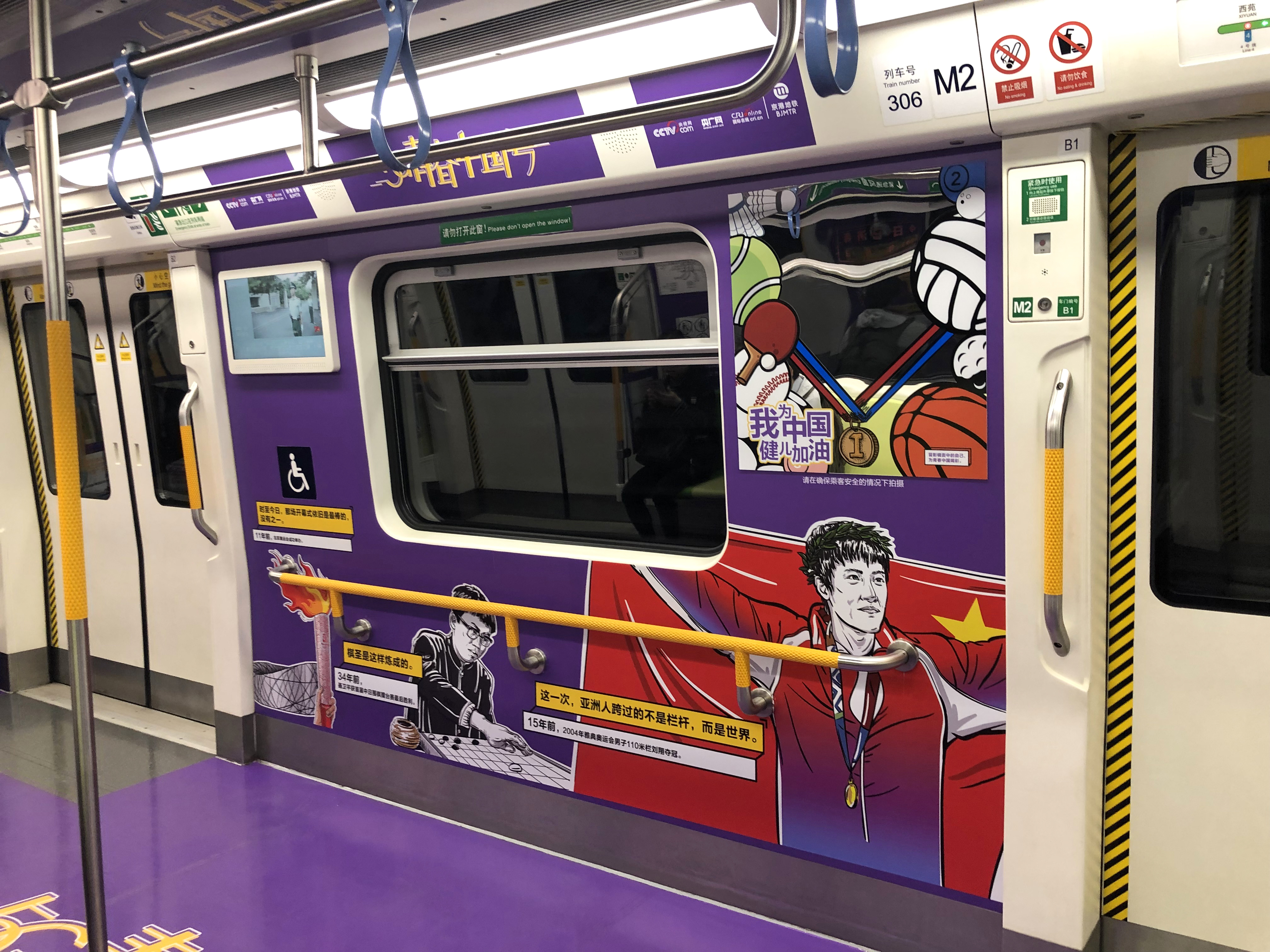
Nie Weiping depicted on a Beijing subway

After the establishment of the People's Republic of China in 1949, the level of professional Go in China was quite low, and the game was considered a "bourgeois" activity not suitable for revolutionaries. The Cultural Revolution (1966–76) prevented any serious development of the game in the early years of the Republic. The state of Chinese Go improved under Premier Zhou Enlai, who worked to revive the national weiqi team. Starting in 1960, the China-Japan Go Friendship Match was held annually. These matches continued until 1991. Initially, Japanese players dominated these matches, but over time, as the Chinese Weiqi Association developed the quality of Go education in China, Chinese professional players began to catch up. Another key element in the growth of Chinese Go was the influence of the Nihon Ki-in and Japanese players like Fujisawa Shuko who went on teaching tours in China, introducing them to modern Go strategy. One of the earliest strong Chinese players during this Chinese Go revival was Nie Weiping, the “Iron Goalkeeper”. When a Japanese nine-dan player arrived for a tour of China in 1974, he easily defeated six Chinese players. But Nie Weiping defeated him, making a name for himself. Nie then led the Chinese team to victory against Japan in the first China-Japan Supermatches (1984–85). This victory showed that for the first time in decades, Chinese players could match the skill of their neighbors and increased the popularity of Go among the Chinese.

During the 21st century, Chinese and Korean players dominated the world Go scene. During the turn of the century, Lee Chang-ho and Lee Sedol vied with each other while sweeping world titles; along with Cho Hun-hyun and Yoo Chang-hyuk. These four were known as the "World's Four Strongest". The layer of new talents chasing them, like Park Yeong-hun, was also extremely deep, making their hegemony seem unshakable. However, starting around 2005, China, which had been vigorously fostering young players at a national level, began catching up rapidly. Young Chinese players like Chang Hao and Gu Li began competing for the world's top spots. Young Chinese players like Zhou Ruiyang, Chen Yaoye, Wang Xi and the Taiwanese Chou Chun-hsun competed with Koreans like Choi Cheol-han, Park Yeong-hun, and Kang Dong-yun for the top international titles.

During the late 20th century, numerous international professional Go tournaments were created, such as the Ing Cup, Samsung Fire Cup, LG Cup, and the Chunlan Cup. Today, these tournaments are mostly dominated by Korean, Japanese and Chinese players, even though players from other nations have also participated more recently.

== Development in the West ==
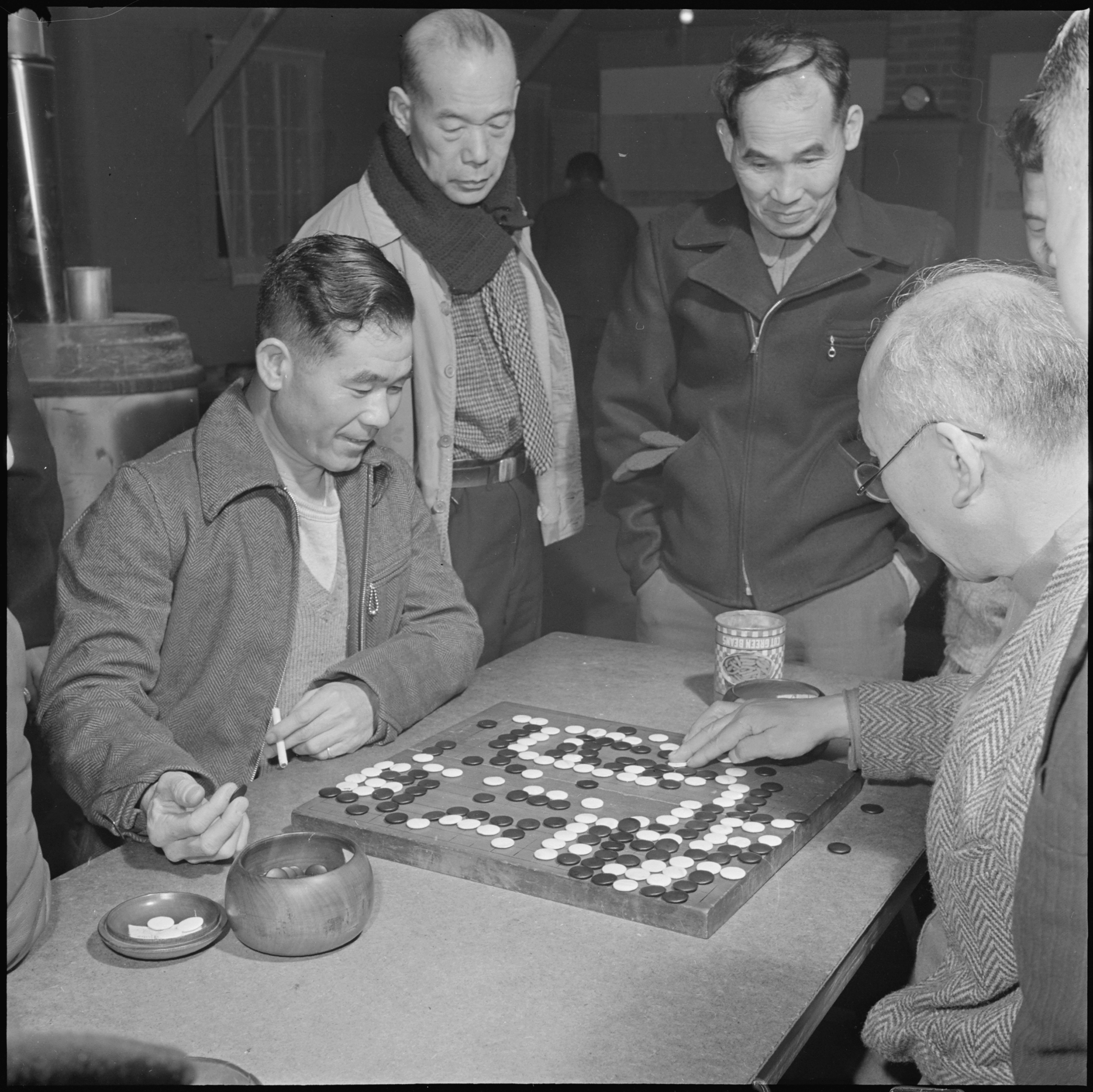
Japanese-Americans play Go at the Heart Mountain Relocation Center during the Internment of Japanese Americans. Asian-American immigrates have been central players in the growth of the game in the West.

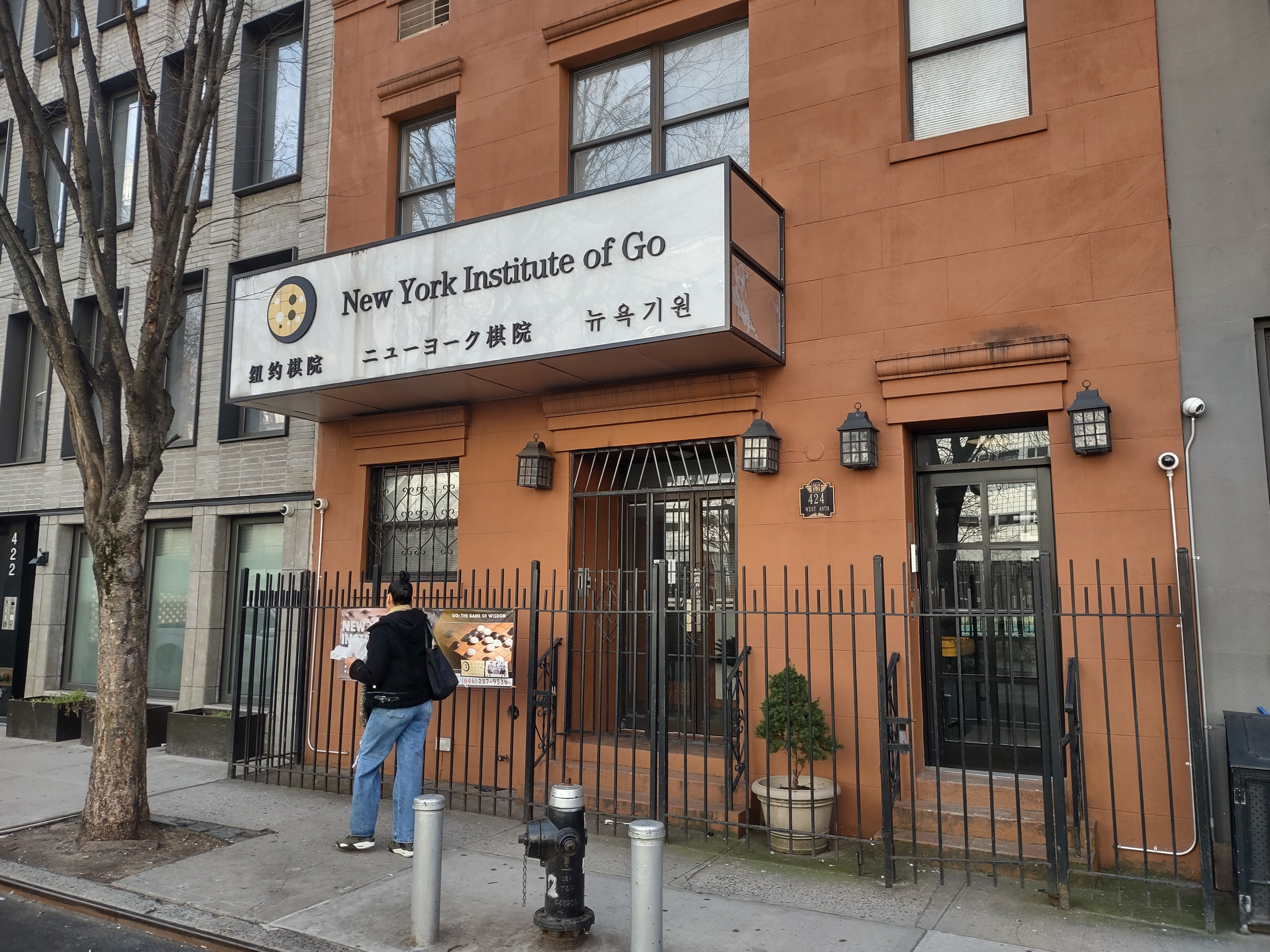
New York Institute of Go

Despite its widespread popularity in East Asia, Go has been slow to spread to the rest of the world, unlike other games of ancient Asian origin, such as chess, who also have a much longer history in the West. Ulrich Schädler speculates that chess has more widespread appeal because culturally congruent game pieces can be created in chess (e.g. Queen and Bishop in Western Chess, Advisor and Elephant in Chinese Chess), while Go is totally abstract. Also, there is no climactic ending in Go (such as checkmate in chess). New players often have trouble figuring out when a game of Go is over. Other theories center around the existence of fundamental differences in the level and type of thinking required by Go players as opposed to chess players. While pure analytical thought and the ability to plan many moves in advance are advantageous in chess, in Go a more intuitive approach based on pattern recognition and experience is stressed.

The first detailed description of Go in a European language, De Circumveniendi Ludo Chinensium (About the Chinese encircling game), was written in Latin by British orientalist Thomas Hyde, and was included in his 1694 treatise on Oriental board games, De Ludis Orientalibus (About Oriental games, pp. 195–201). The German philosopher and polymath Leibniz (1646–1716) also published an entire article about Go which included an illustration of the game, Leibniz also wrote that he did not understand the game fully.

The first recorded game of Go in Europe was played in 1872 between Kido Takayoshi and Ōkubo Toshimichi, both ambassadors of the Iwakura Mission, which traveled to the United States and Europe between 1871 and 1873.

Oskar Korschelt, a German engineer, is credited with being the first person to try to popularize Go outside of East Asia. He learned about the game from Hon'inbō Shūho (Murase Shūho) when he worked in Japan from 1878 to 1886. Korschelt published the book Das Go Spiel in 1880. He brought the game to Europe, especially to Germany and Austria, and thus became the first person to properly systematically describe Go in a Western language.

By the early 20th century, Go had spread throughout the German and Austro-Hungarian empires. In 1905, Edward Lasker learned the game while in Berlin. When he moved to New York, Lasker founded the New York Go Club together with (amongst others) Arthur Smith, who had learned of the game while touring the East and had published the book The Game of Go in 1908. Lasker's book Go and Go-moku (1934) helped spread the game throughout the US, and in 1935, the American Go Association was formed. Two years later, in 1937, the German Go Association was founded. European Go clubs first appeared in Poland in the 1920s and in 1930s Germany. In the United States, New York Go club and San Francisco Go club were the earliest clubs. Since most of the early figures of Western Go learned Go from Japanese sources, Western language Go cultures tend to make use of Japanese terminology (such as atari, jōseki, etc), and Westerners generally refer to the game by the Japanese derived name of Go.

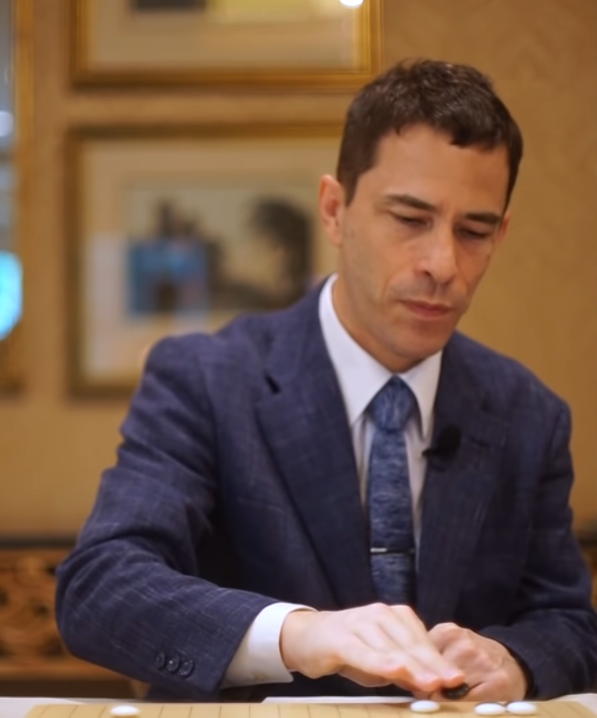
Michael Redmond in 2018

World War II put a stop to most Go activity, but after the war, Go continued to spread and grow in the West.

For most of the 20th century, the Japan Go Association played a leading role in spreading Go outside East Asia, publishing the English-language magazine Go Review in the 1960s, establishing Go centers in the US, Europe and South America, and often sending professional teachers on tour to Western nations. Go Review became a major source for Western players.

In 1965, first Go competitions were held in the USSR at the Palace of Culture in Leningrad. The Go section was organized by the Japan-USSR society and operated together with the local chess club. In August 1974, the first competition with the participation of professional players from Japan was held, and in 1975, a toy factory in the Moscow region began serial production of Go sets.

The 1970s saw Richard Bozulich found the influential Ishi Press (now Kiseido Publishing Company), which began to publish the first translations of high level Go strategy books along with instructional books for beginners and the magazine Go World. Other Go focused publishing presses followed, like Yutopian Press and Slate and Shell Press. The Go books published by these publishers helped many players in the West to advance into the intermediate ranks. In 1978, Manfred Wimmer became the first Westerner to receive a professional player's certificate from an East Asian professional Go association. It was not until 2000 that American-born Michael Redmond, achieved a professional 9 dan rating, the top rank awarded by East Asian Go associations. He remains the only Westerner to reach the highest grade of 9-dan professional.

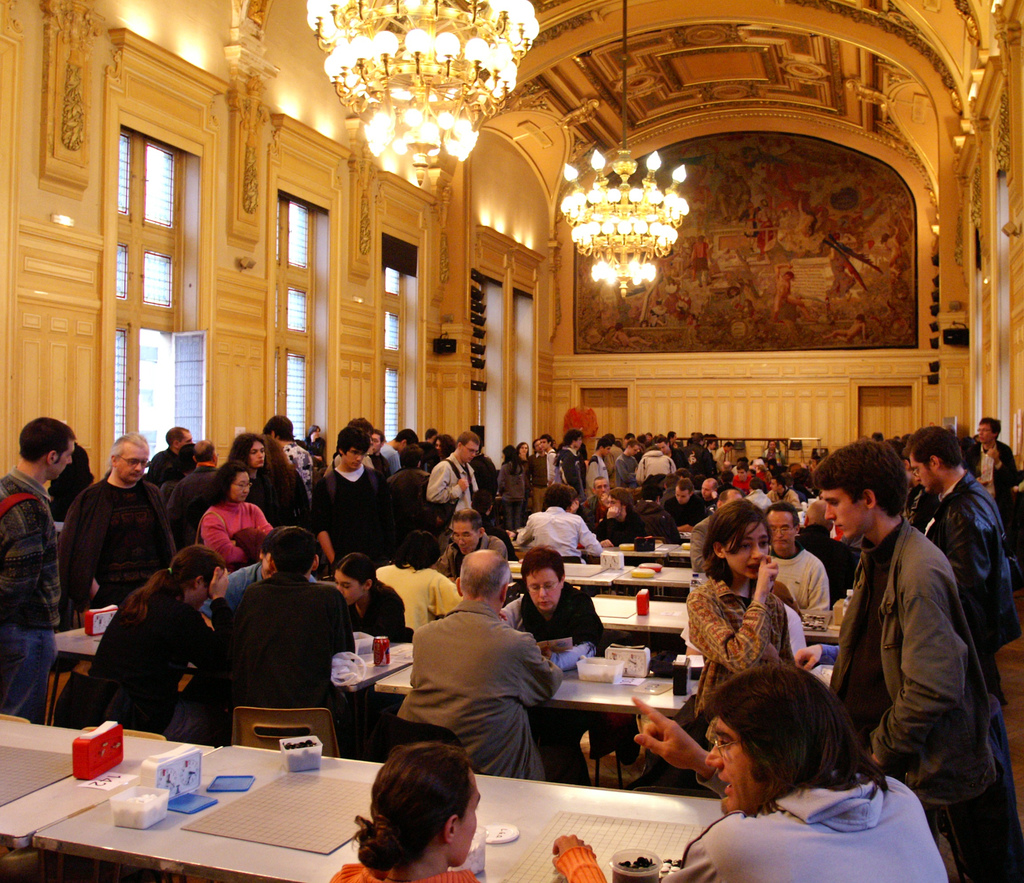
A 2006 Go tournament in Paris.

Another important figure for the promotion of Go in Western countries was the wealthy Taiwanese Ing Chang Yi, who sponsored numerous tournaments and provided donations to American and European Go organizations.

In 1996, NASA astronaut Daniel Barry and Japanese astronaut Koichi Wakata became the first people to play Go in space, they used a special Go set designed by Wai-Cheung Willson Chow. Both astronauts were awarded honorary dan ranks by the Nihon Kiin.

== 21st century developments ==
The 21st century saw further growth of Go culture in Western countries, especially in the United States and Europe. By 2005, the European Go Federation had a total of 35 member countries. During the 2010s, the Korea Baduk Association aided the American Go Association in holding the first major professional qualifying tournament in the United States, as depicted in the 2017 documentary "The Surrounding Game". The first 1 dan professionals who gained the title in the United States (Andy Liu and Gansheng Shi) arose from this tournament.

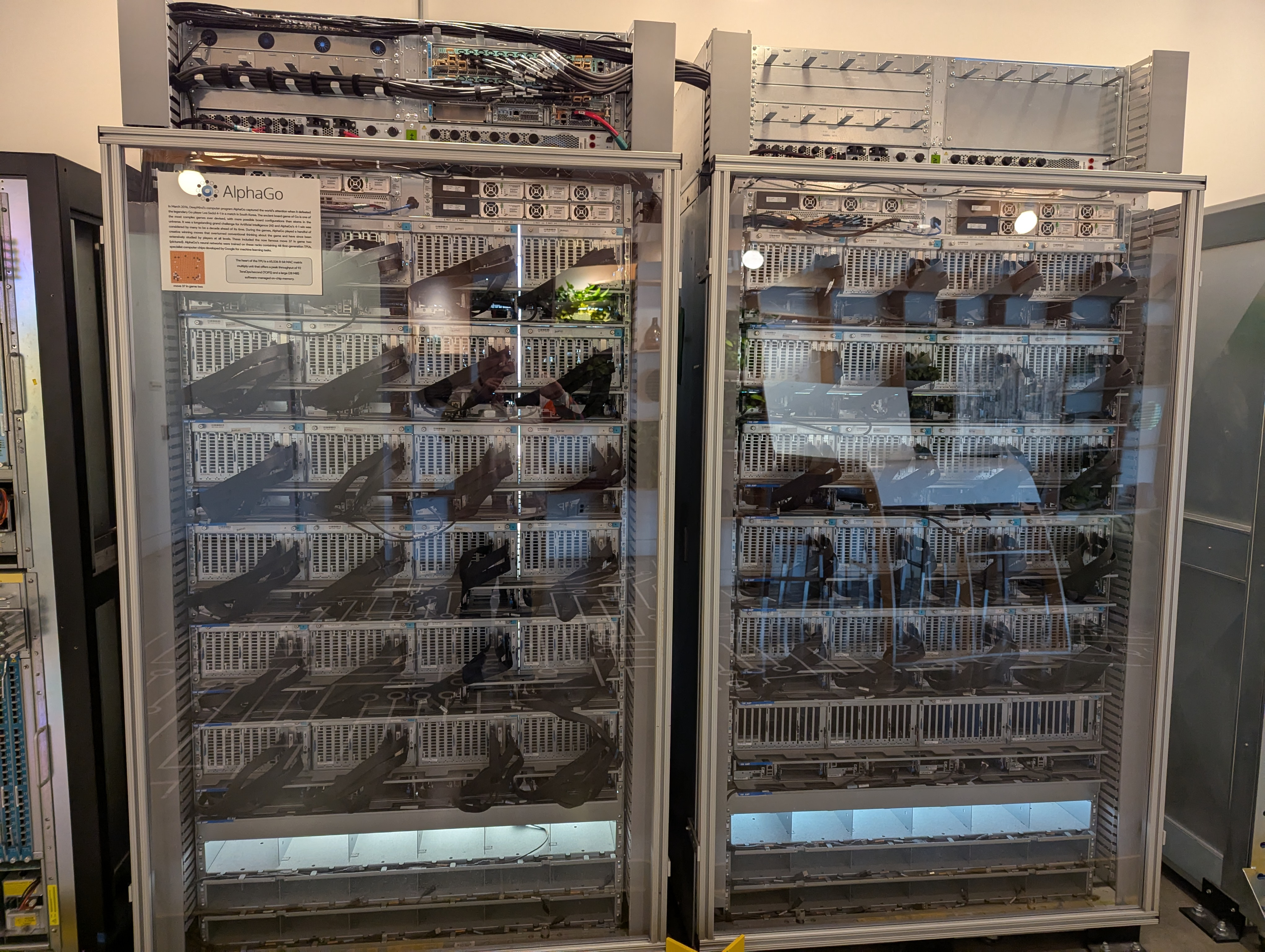
Decommissioned AlphaGo backend rack

One of the most influential developments was the rise in Go playing computer programs to the level of professional strength. Strong computer programs relying on the Monte Carlo method began to defeat experienced human players in the mid 2000s. In March 2016, Google's AlphaGo achieved a historic 4-1 victory against Lee Sedol, an 18-time world champion, in a match that attracted widespread publicity, being widely televised and watched across Asia. This landmark event occurred 19 years after IBM's Deep Blue defeated chess grandmaster Garry Kasparov, but Go's vastly greater complexity made AlphaGo's achievement even more significant. The program's ability to calculate 10,000 moves per second, combined with advanced search trees and deep neural networks, revolutionized computer Go capabilities. Lee Sedol's subsequent retirement announcement in 2019, citing AlphaGo as "an entity that cannot be defeated," symbolized the profound psychological impact this event had on professional players who had dedicated their lives to mastering the game.

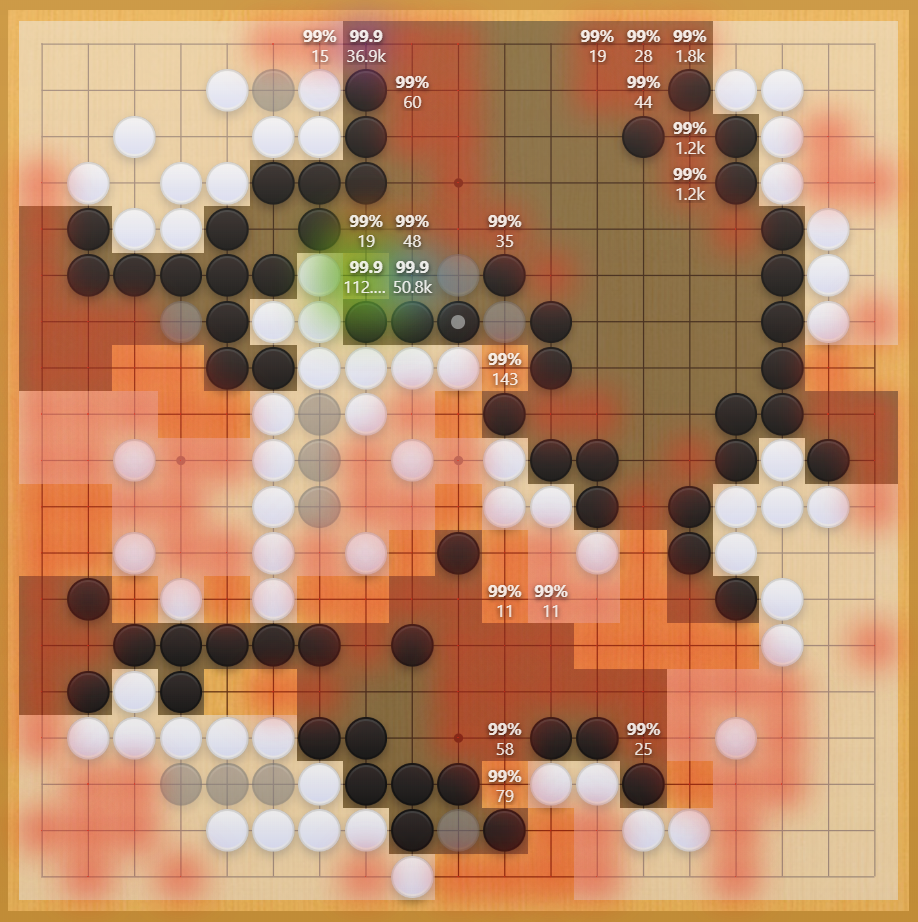
Katago visual computer analysis of a game

Since 2016, computer programs like the open source KataGo are regularly used by amateurs and pros to review games and test their skills. They are also used in Go computer games and online servers. Go programs have also led to new strategies. The advent of Go AIs has challenged traditional conceptions of Go as a uniquely human lifelong spiritual and intellectual pursuit. Historically, professional Go players viewed their craft similarly to philosophers or scholars, dedicating themselves to an endless quest for deeper understanding. The traditional "uchi-deshi" system, where students lived with their masters to study the game intensively, embodied this philosophical approach. However, AI's demonstration that the highest levels of play could be achieved through computational power rather than lifetime contemplation has created an existential crisis for many professionals. In spite of this, many professional players have embraced AI as an essential training tool. In Korea's professional circuit, serious competitors maintain AI setups at home, and success increasingly depends on one's ability to learn from and emulate AI play. This shift has produced both positive and negative consequences. For example, Go computer programs have helped young and old players advance or revive their play. And yet, the use of computers also led to a homogenization of playing styles as many professionals increasingly imitate AI approaches, abandoning distinctive and creative personal styles that previously attracted fans.

Furthermore, the teaching profession within Go has faced significant economic challenges. Demand for professional-level teaching games and private lessons has declined substantially, as AI can provide high-level analysis and review services previously exclusive to human professionals. This change has particularly affected "teaching professionals" who supplemented tournament earnings through instruction. While AI cannot fully replace human teachers in explaining concepts or providing personalized guidance, many parents and students now prefer AI-assisted learning over expensive professional instruction. This shift has forced many teaching professionals to seek alternative livelihoods or adapt their pedagogical approaches. The COVID-19 pandemic's shift to online play also exacerbated concerns about AI-assisted cheating. Organizations have implemented stricter guidelines, including electronics prohibitions and mandatory proctoring. High-profile cheating accusations, even when disproven, reflect the growing technological challenges facing the Go community.

The use of Go computer programs has also introduced numerous tactical and strategic innovations to Go theory. Moves previously considered questionable or crude, such as direct 3-3 point invasions, have been validated and adopted at the highest levels. AI's superior ability to evaluate global positions rather than conduct deep local calculations has shifted strategic emphasis throughout the game. Paradoxically, while AI has made some traditional styles obsolete, it has also validated previously unconventional approaches. Lesser-known openings like the San ren sei (Three Star Points in a Row), Southern Cross, and even the eccentric "Black hole" opening have gained legitimacy through AI analysis.

== See also ==
- Go at the 2010 Asian Games
- International Go Federation
- List of professional Go tournaments
- Dunhuang Go Manual
- Classic of Arts

== Sources ==
- Potter, Donald L. (1984). "Go in the Classics". Go World (37). Tokyo: Ishi Press: 16–18. Archived from the original on 2010-12-18.
- Potter, Donald L. (1985). "Go in the Classics (ii): the Tso-chuan". Go World (42). Tokyo: Ishi Press: 19–21. Archived from the original on 2010-12-18.
- Fairbairn, John (1995). "Go in Ancient China".
- Fairbairn, John (2000). "History of Go in Korea". Archived from the original on 2011-06-08.
- Lasker, Edward (1960) [1934]. Go and Go-Moku. Courier Corporation. ISBN 0-486-20613-0.
- Pinckard, William (1989). "The Four Accomplishments". In Richard Bozulich (ed.). Japanese Prints and the World of Go. Archived from the original on 2008-03-16..
- Peng, Mike; Hall, Mark (1996). "One Giant Leap For Go" (PDF). Svensk Gotidning. 96 (2): 7–8. Archived from the original (PDF) on 2012-03-04.
- Shotwell, Peter (3 April 2003). "The Game of Go in Ancient and Modern Tibet" (PDF). Archived from the original (PDF) on 31 January 2023. Revision of Shotwell, Peter (1993). "Go in the Snow". GoWorld. No. 69.
- Shotwell, Peter (2011). Go! More Than a Game. Tuttle Publishing. ISBN 9781462900060
