= 9 Pin Zhi =

The 9 Pin Zhi (Chinese: 九品制) was an ancient Chinese ranking system for the game of Go, derived from the 3rd-century book Classic of Arts by Handan Chun. The system was formally introduced under the weichi Zhouyi ("Ministry of Go"), founded in southern China during the Song dynasty and considered the first official organisation dedicated to the game in Chinese history; its list of nine ranks in the commonly cited form is recorded in the twelfth chapter of the Qijing Shisanpian ("Classic of Go in Thirteen Chapters"), an important Go text written in 1050. Now, in Go there are nine levels:

- The first is called Entering the Divine (入神; rùshén)
- The second is called Sitting Illumination (坐照; zuòzhào)
- The third is called Complete in Form (具体; 具體; jùtǐ)
- The fourth is called Penetrating the Subtle (通幽; tōngyōu)
- The fifth is called Applying Wisdom (用智; yòngzhì)
- The sixth is called Small Cleverness (小巧; xiǎoqiǎo)
- The seventh is called Contending by Force (斗力; 鬥力; dòulì)
- The eighth is called Seeming Foolish (若愚; ruòyú)
- The ninth is called Keeping to Clumsiness (守拙; shǒuzhuō)

The rest fall outside the nine ranks. This system is loosely based on the Nine-rank system (Chinese: 九品中正制 or 九品官人法), used at the imperial court to rank the importance of officials.
