= Classic of Arts =

3rd-century Chinese book written by Handan Chun

The Classic of Arts (Chinese: 藝經) was a 3rd-century Chinese book written by Handan Chun on the various cultivated arts of ancient China. The book also briefly discussed some basics of the game of Go, and it was the first to state the 9 Pin Zhi, a system for Go ranks and ratings. It describes the board of the time as having seventeen lines in both length and width, for 289 points in total, with 150 stones allotted to each player.

== See also ==
- International Go Federation
