= Seoul Baekje Museum =

- 한성백제박물관
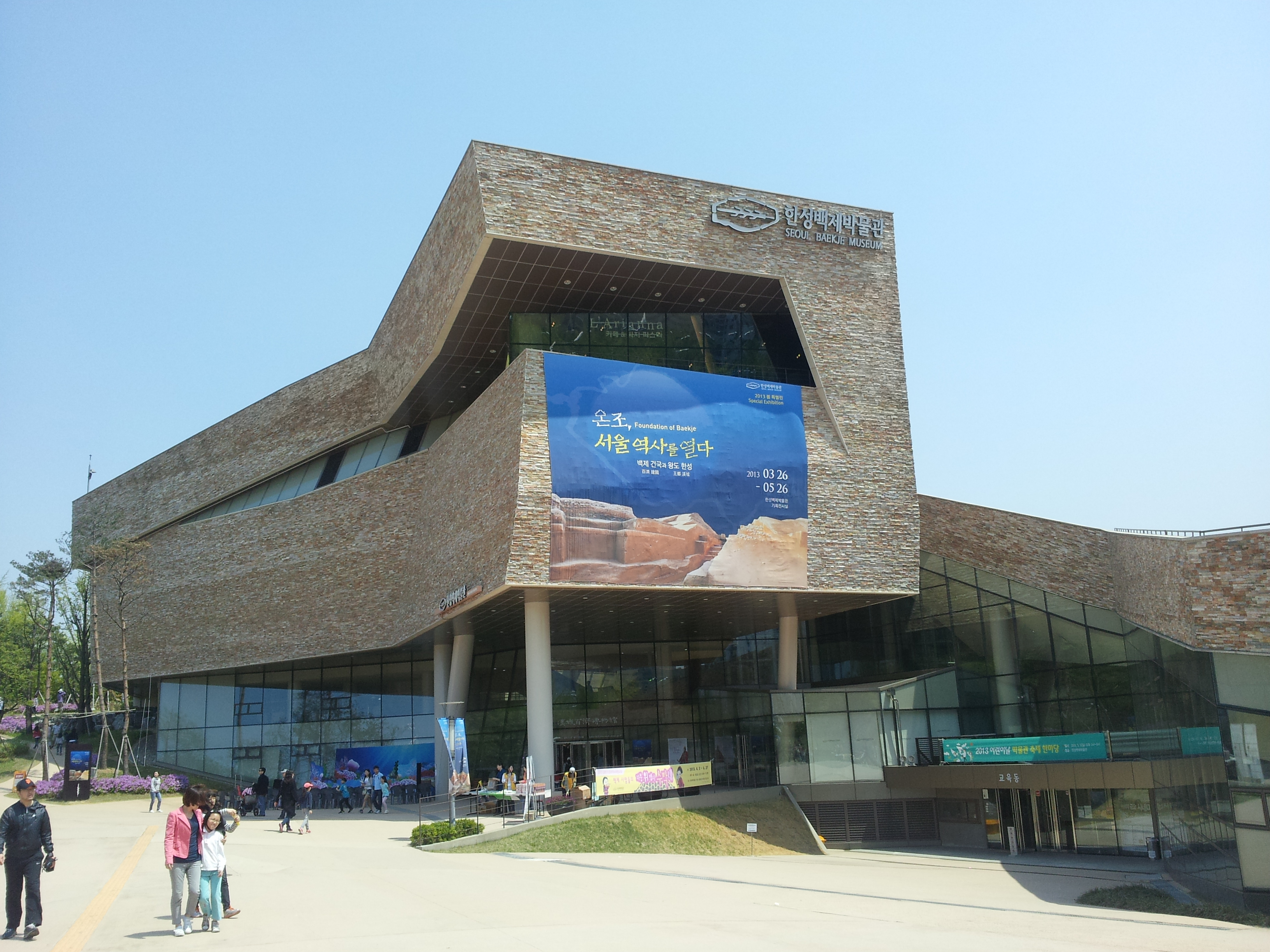

General information
- Address: Seoul Baekje Museum, 71, Wiryeseong-daero(88-20, Bangi-dong), Songpa-gu, Seoul
- Town or city: Songpa District, Seoul
- Country: South Korea
- Coordinates: 37.5154°N 127.1209°E
- Opened: 2012

Website
- baekjemuseum.seoul.go.kr/eng/

Seoul Baekje Museum (Korean: 한성백제박물관) is a museum in South Korea. Based on the natural silhouette of the nearby Mongchontoseong, the appearance of Seoul Baekje Museum was shaped a ship of Baekje. Seoul Baekje Museum is a civic lifelong education center with an emphasis on the educational role. There are a variety of Baekje artifacts and vividly embodied materials on ancient history of the Korean peninsula.
