= 1st Ing Cup =

The 1st Ing Cup was the first edition of the Ing Cup, an international Go tournament held every four years. The 1st Ing Cup was a sixteen player invitational, with six players representing the Nihon Ki-in (Kobayashi Koichi, Kato Masao, Fujisawa Shuko, Takemiya Masaki, Hashimoto Shoji, and Cho Chikun), five players representing the Zhongguo Qiyuan (Liu Xiaoguang, Ma Xiaochun, Jiang Zhujiu, Wu Songsheng, and Nie Weiping), three Taiwanese Nihon Ki-in players (O Rissei, O Meien, and Rin Kaiho), one player from the Hanguk Kiwon (Cho Hunhyun), and one player representing North America (Michael Redmond).

The first round was held on 21 August 1988 and the tournament concluded with the fifth and final match of the finals on 5 September 1989. Cho Hunhyun won the tournament, defeating three Nihon Ki-in players along the way.

== Knockout round ==
Round of 16
21 August
(China) Nie Weiping	1
(United States) Michael Redmond	0
21 August
(Japan) Cho Chikun	1
(China) Wu Songsheng	0
21 August
(Japan) Fujisawa Shuko	1
(China) Ma Xiaochun	0
21 August
(Japan) Kato Masao	1
(China) Liu Xiaoguang	0
21 August
(South Korea) Cho Hunhyun	1
(Taiwan) O Meien	0
21 August
(Japan) Kobayashi Koichi	1
(Taiwan) O Rissei	0
21 August
(Taiwan) Rin Kaiho	1
(Japan) Hashimoto Shoji	0
21 August
(China) Jiang Zhujiu	1
(Japan) Takemiya Masaki	0

Quarter-finals
Nie Weiping	1
Cho Chikun	0
Fujisawa Shuko	1
Kato Masao	0
Cho Hunhyun	1
Kobayashi Koichi	0
Rin Kaiho	1
Jiang Zhujiu	0

Semi-finals
Nie Weiping	2
Fujisawa Shuko	0
Cho Hunhyun	2
Rin Kaiho	0

Final
Nie Weiping	2
Cho Hunhyun	3

== Final ==
Player	1	2	3	4	5	T
(South Korea) Cho Hunhyun	W+3.5			B+1.5	B+R	3
(China) Nie Weiping		ㅕ W+9.5	B+2.5			2
