= Jiang Zhujiu =

Chinese professional Go player (born 1962)

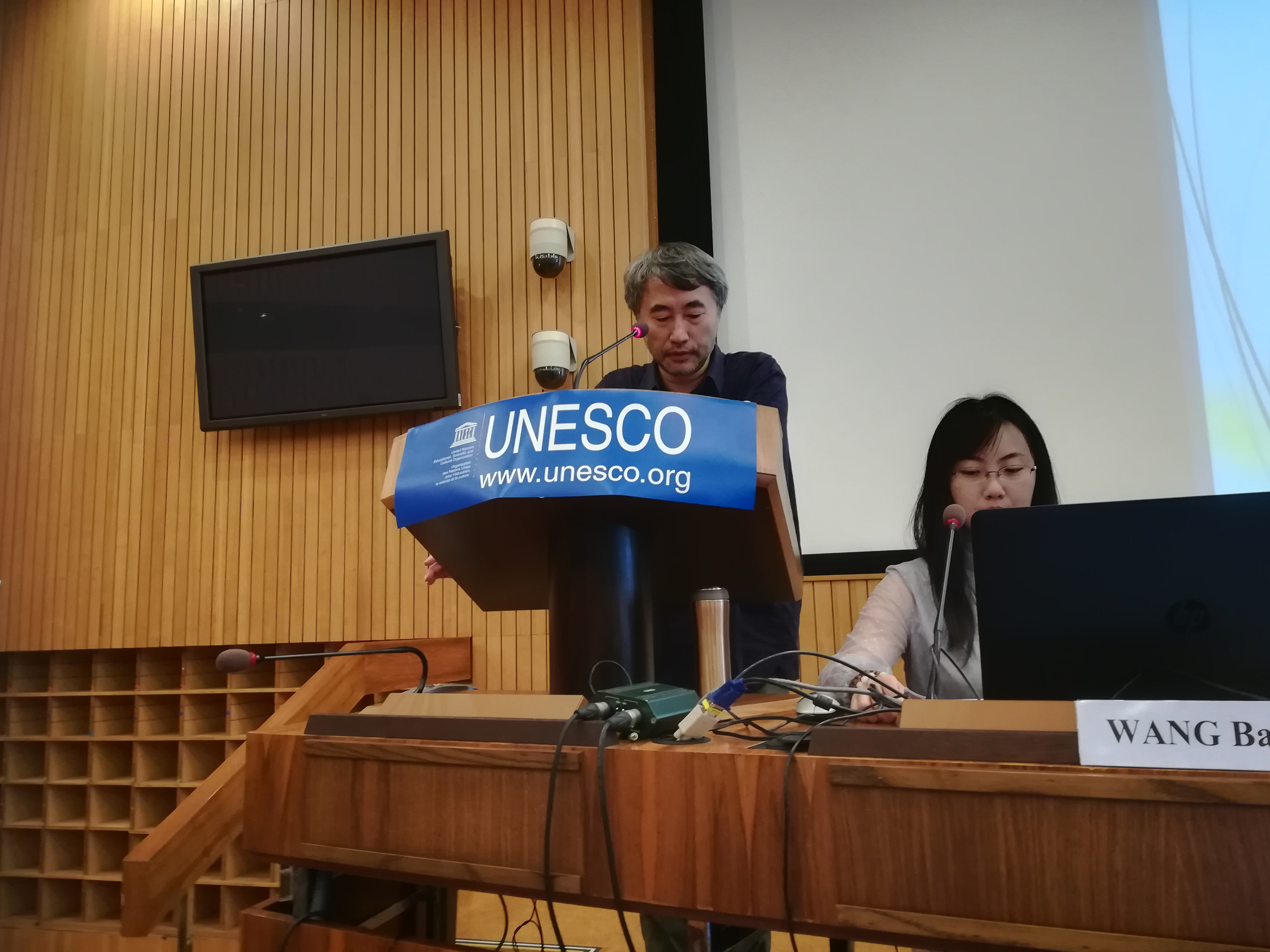

Personal information
- Native name: 장주주 (Korean); 江鑄久 (Korean)
- Nickname: Jujo
- Born: February 17, 1962 (age 64) Taiyuan, China

Sport
- Rank: 9 dan
- Affiliation: Chinese Weiqi Association (1985-19??); American Go Association (19??-19??); Hanguk Kiwon (1999-2011); Chinese Weiqi Association (2011-present)

Jiang Zhujiu (Chinese: 江铸久; pinyin: Jiāng Zhùjiǔ; born February 17, 1962, in Taiyuan) is a Chinese professional 9-dan Go player.

== Biography ==
Jiang began playing Go when he was 6. In 1982, he was 5 dan, and in 1983 he entered the Go Ratings top ten worlds. In 1984, Jiang defeated Norimoto Yoda, Satoru Kobayashi, Shuzo Awaji, Satoshi Kataoka and Akira Ishida consecutively in the first Sino-Japanese Go Challenge, and was promoted to 8 dan. He was promoted to 9 dan 1987. In 1988, he defeated Masaki Takemiya and entered the quarter-finals of the inaugural Ing Cup. In the following year, he won the runner-up in the Chinese Go Championship, also defeating Cao Dayuan, Fang Tianfeng, Rui Naiwei, and Qian Yuping to become the challenger for the 3rd Tianyuan. He narrowly lost 2-3 to Liu Xiaoguang in the finals.

In 1990, Jiang’s lover Rui Naiwei had to leave China to become the apprentice of Go Seigen after a falling out with some officials at the Chinese Weiqi Association. He and Rui reunited in the United States, and the two married in 1992. From 1995 to 2002, Jiang defeated Rui Naiwei, Michael Redmond, Jimmy Cha, and others to win the North American Masters Tournament a consecutive eight times. In 1996, he entered the inaugural LG Cup, competing under the banner of American Go Association. He managed to break into the top eight by scoring consecutive victories against Ryu Shikun and Chen Linxin, but was then defeated by Yoo Chang-hyuk. In 1999, Jiang and Rui were accepted as visiting professional players by the Korea Baduk Association. In 2003, he defeated Rui Naiwei 2-0 and won the Maxim Cup.

In 2011, Jiang and Rui returned to the Chinese Weiqi Association. The two are the only "18 dan couple" in the world today. His elder brother, Jiang Mingjiu, is also a professional Go player.

== Past titles & Runner up's ==
Title	Years Held
Current	1
(South Korea) Maxim Cup	2003
Defunct	8
(United States) NAMT	1995–2002

Title	Years Lost
Current	3
(China) Tianyuan	1989
(China) National Go Individual	1989
(China) New Sports Cup	1986
