= NEC Cup =

Japanese Go competition

The NEC Cup was a Go competition, supported by NEC Corporation between 1982 and 2012.

== Biography ==
The NEC Cup was a Go competition used by the Japanese Nihon-Kiin. Unlike the big three titles in Japan, the NEC Cup is a single knockout tournament where players have less time to think. The field of challengers was 16. The challengers were invited depending on who were the holders of Kisei, Meijin, Honinbo, Judan, Tengen, Oza, Gosei, NHK Cup, JAL Super Hayago Championship, NEC Shun-Ei and the top finishers from the last NEC Cup. The winner was awarded with 15,000,000 Yen ($130,000).

== Past winners ==
NEC Cup
| Player | Years Held |
|---|---|
| Takemiya Masaki | 1982, 1986 |
| Sakata Eio | 1983 |
| Cho Chikun | 1984, 1985, 2000, 2001 |
| Otake Hideo | 1987, 1989, 1996 |
| Ishida Yoshio | 1988 |
| Rin Kaiho | 1990 |
| Kato Masao | 1991, 1992, 1997 |
| Yoda Norimoto | 1993, 1998, 2002 |
| Komatsu Hideki | 1994 |
| Kobayashi Koichi | 1995, 1999, 2004 |
| Ryu Shikun | 2003 |
| Cho U | 2005, 2007, 2011 |
| Cho Sonjin | 2006 |
| Kono Rin | 2008, 2010 |
| Hane Naoki | 2009 |
| Takao Shinji | 2012 |
