= Yuta Iyama =

Japanese Go player (born 1989)

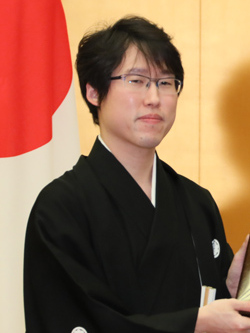
- Iyama in 2018

Personal information
- Native name: 井山裕太 (Japanese)
- Full name: Yuta Iyama
- Born: 24 May 1989 (age 37) Higashiosaka, Osaka, Japan

Sport
- Turned pro: 2002
- Teacher: Kunio Ishii
- Rank: 9 dan
- Affiliation: Nihon Ki-in, Kansai branch
Medal record
Men's Go
Representing Japan
Asian Games
Bronze medal – third place	2022 Hangzhou	Men's team
Bronze medal – third place	2010 Guangzhou	Men's Team

Yuta Iyama Kisei, Honinbo, Meijin (井山 裕太, Iyama Yūta; born 24 May 1989) is a Japanese professional Go player. In April 2016, he became the first player in Japanese history to hold all seven major titles simultaneously. In January 2018, Iyama became the first professional Go player to be awarded Japan's People's Honour Award.

== Biography ==
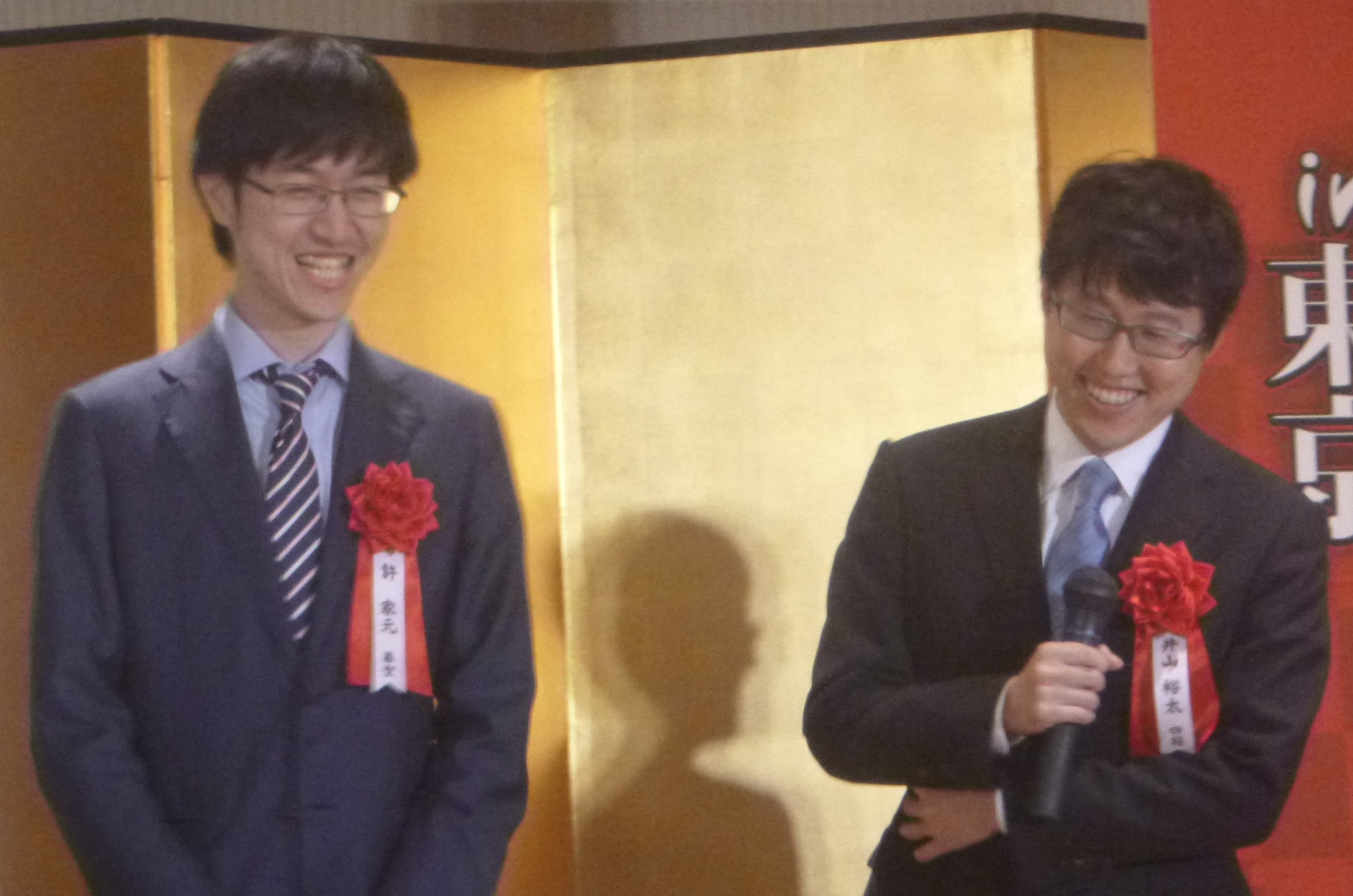
Yuta Iyama (right) in 2019, with Hsu Chia-yuan

Born in Osaka, Iyama became the first professional of the Heisei period. He began playing Go at the age of five and reached the rank of 3 dan amateur a year later. It was at this time Kunio Ishii became Iyama's teacher, with the two playing thousands of games online. He won the national elementary school championship twice, in 1997 and 1998. Iyama became an insei in October 1998 and challenged for a professional spot in 2001. He lost to Kohei Kawada. The following year, he challenged again and passed the qualifying test. At the time, Iyama was the fourth youngest professional behind Cho Chikun, Utaro Hashimoto and Satoshi Yuki.

Iyama was promoted to 2 dan on 4 September 2002. During the China-Japan Agon Cup in 2002, Iyama played an unofficial match with Chen Yaoye. Iyama lost the match by resignation. In June 2003, Iyama was promoted to 3 dan for his performances in the Oteai. Nearly two years later, Iyama was promoted to 4 dan under the newly revised promotion rules.

He met his rival, Daisuke Murakawa, a fellow player from the Kansai region, in the final section of the 30th Shinjin-O. Taking white, Iyama went on to win by 5.5 points. Iyama won the first major game of his career when he defeated Cho U by resignation in the 20th Agon Cup. He would go on to win the tournament, becoming the youngest title holder in Japanese history at 16 years and five months. The previous holder of the record was Cho Chikun, who won the Shin-Ei, a tournament open to young players only, at 17 years. As a result of winning the tournament, Iyama was directly promoted to 7 dan and became the youngest 7 dan in Japanese Go.

Before winning the Agon Cup, Iyama won the Nakano Cup, a privately sponsored unofficial tournament, and unsuccessfully challenged for the Shinjin-O title, losing to Kim Shushun. Iyama was a member of the Japanese team at the 6th Asian New Star Match, where he won one match. Japan finished in third place behind South Korea and China. Iyama participated in the China-Japan Agon Cup in 2006, losing to Gu Li by resignation.

Iyama won two awards for his performance during the 2005 season: the New Star award and an award for having the highest winning percentage (75.47%). In August 2006, Iyama made it to the last game of the 61st Honinbo preliminary stage. Facing Cho Sonjin (a former Honinbo), Iyama took black and lost by resignation. Had Iyama won, he would have been the youngest participant of the Honinbo league at 17 years. Three months after his unsuccessful Honinbo league bid, Iyama participated in the first edition of the Daiwa Cup, an internet tournament. Iyama qualified for the main tournament, but was unable to challenge for the title.

Iyama won his second official tournament when he defeated Kenichi Mochizuki in the Shinjin-O final. In September 2007, Iyama reached the challenger final of his first major title, the Tengen. Taking black, Iyama lost to Keigo Yamashita by 1.5 points and was unable to challenge title-holder Rin Kono. Iyama qualified for his first international tournament, the 21st Fujitsu Cup, by defeating Kanketsu Rin and Michihiro Morita in the preliminary stages. In the main tournament, Iyama defeated Taiwanese representative Zhou Junxun, but lost to Korea's Lee Sedol in the second round.

In March 2008, Iyama participated in the 1st Yugen Cup, a tournament pitting veteran professionals against newly promoted youngsters. He finished in 6th place, but won all six of his games. Iyama reached the final round of the preliminary tournament for the 13th LG Cup, but was unable to make the final tournament. No other Japanese players qualified.

Two months later, in July 2008, Iyama won the 33rd Meijin league. At the age of 19, Iyama became the youngest ever challenger for the Meijin title and the youngest challenger for any of the major titles. He broke a record held by Cho Chikun, who challenged for the Oza title in 1976 at the age of 20 years. As a result of winning the league, Iyama was directly promoted to 8 dan. Iyama's title bid was unsuccessful as he lost in seven games to title-holder Cho U.

A few days after earning the right to challenge for the 33rd Meijin, Iyama defeated Cho U in the final of the 1st Daiwa Cup Grand Champion, an internet tournament for winners of the other Daiwa Cup tournaments. Iyama was also a part of the Japanese team at the 1st World Mind Sports Games. While challenging for the Meijin title, Iyama faced Cho U again, this time in the Oza challenger final. Iyama took black and lost by resignation.

A month later, in October 2008, Iyama reached another challenger final. He faced Norimoto Yoda in the challenger final of the 33rd Kisei and lost by resignation. In March 2008, Iyama participated in the inaugural BC Card Cup as one of Japan's two representatives, Cho Chikun being the other. Chikun was knocked out in the first round by Paek Hongsuk, but Iyama won two games in a row against Kim Seongjae and On Sojin. Iyama came up against Cho Hanseung in the third round and was eliminated by the Korean representative.

That same month Iyama participated in two unofficial tournaments, the Yugen Cup, which he won, and the RICOH Rengo Cup. Iyama and partner Xie Yimin lost to Naoki Hane and Keiko Kato in the final of the Rengo Cup. Iyama also won the Kido "Outstanding Player" award for his performances during the 2008 season.

Iyama was one of four Japanese participants at the 14th LG Cup, where he won his first game against Yun Junsang and lost his second game against Lee Chang-ho. Iyama also reached the challenger final of the 34th Gosei, but eventually lost to Satoshi Yuki by 1.5 points.

After losing the Meijin the previous year, Iyama won the Meijin league again in July 2009 and earned the right to challenge Cho U. He went undefeated in the league, becoming the fourth player in the modern-era to go undefeated in the Meijin league. Two months later Iyama qualified for his first Honinbo league.

Iyama lost the first game of his Meijin challenge, but then went on to win four in-a-row. As a result, Iyama broke three records: youngest major title winner, youngest Meijin and youngest 9 dan, breaking records set by Cho Chikun, Rin Kaiho and his opponent in the Meijin finals, Cho U. Iyama also won the Ryusei title, televised on the date of the final Meijin match.

In December 2009, Iyama participated in his first Nongshim Cup. He was the third Japanese player and lost his game to Xie He, who won five straight games before losing to Naoki Hane. Iyama led the Japanese most wins list in 2009 with a record of 43 wins and 14 losses. Iyama was also awarded the Shusai Prize for his performances during the 2009 season. In February 2010, Iyama lost the final of the 5th Daiwa Cup to Rin Kono.

In May, Iyama reached the challenger final for the 65th Honinbo, but lost to Keigo Yamashita. As a result, for finishing runner-up of the NHK Cup in 2010, Iyama was qualified for the 22nd Asian TV Cup. He lost to Lee Chang-ho in the first round. Iyama was also a representative of the Japanese team at the 16th Asian Games. In October 2010, Iyama was invited to the World Meijin tournament along with Gu Li and Lee Chang-ho. Iyama finished in third place. Iyama then defended his Meijin title in straight wins against Shinji Takao.

In 2010, Iyama won the third most prize money in Japan with 56,482,000 Yen. He unsuccessfully challenged Cho U for the Kisei title in 2011. Iyama won his second major title, the Judan, in 2011.

In January 2017, Iyama was awarded the Shusai Prize, which honors the outstanding player of the previous year. It was his fifth consecutive Shusai Prize. In February 2017, Iyama was awarded the Kido Prize for "Most outstanding player" for winning all top seven titles.

Iyama played in the 2017 World Go Championship, where he lost all three of his matches and finished last.

== Personal life ==
Iyama married Professional shogi player Io Murota in 2012 (both share the same birthday), but the couple divorced in 2015. He remarried an unidentified woman in 2019.

== Promotion record ==
Rank	Year	Notes
1 dan	2002	
2 dan	2002	
3 dan	2003	
4 dan	2004	Promoted from 3 to 4 dan for leading the prize-money list among 3 dan professionals.
5 dan		
6 dan		
7 dan	2005	Promoted from 4 to 7 dan for winning the 12th Agon Cup.
8 dan	2008	Promoted from 7 to 8 dan for challenging for the 33rd Meijin.
9 dan	2009	Promoted from 8 to 9 dan for defeating Cho U to win the 34th Meijin.

== Career record ==
As of 2 May 2019

Year	Won	Lost	Win %
2006	34	14	70.8%
2007	44	11	80.0%
2008	48	21	69.6%
2009	43	14	75.4%
2010	34	21	61.8%
2011	48	19	71.6%
2012	51	12	81.0%
2013	43	18	70.5%
2014	31	19	62.0%
2015	42	11	79.2%
2016	34	10	77.3%
2017	42	10	80.8%
2018	35	27	56.5%
2019	12	12	50.0%
Total	541	219	71.2%

== Titles and runners-up ==
Domestic
Title	Wins	Runners-up
Kisei	9 (2013–2021)	4 (2011, 2022, 2024, 2025)
Meijin	8 (2009, 2010, 2013–2015, 2017, 2020, 2021)	6 (2008, 2011, 2016, 2018, 2022, 2023)
Honinbo	11 (2012–2022)	1 (2023)
Tengen	8 (2011–2013, 2015–2019)	2 (2014, 2020)
Oza	10 (2012, 2013, 2015–2018, 2021-2024)	3 (2014, 2019, 2025)
Gosei	12 (2012–2017, 2021-2026)	1 (2018)
Judan	6 (2011, 2012, 2016–2018, 2024)	3 (2013, 2019, 2025)
Agon Cup	5 (2005, 2011, 2014, 2015, 2020)	3 (2021, 2022, 2023)
Ryusei	5 (2009, 2011, 2012, 2022, 2023)	3 (2020, 2024, 2025)
NHK Cup	4 (2017, 2018, 2020, 2026)	4 (2010, 2013, 2019, 2025)
Shinjin-O	1 (2007)	1 (2005)
Daiwa Cup	2 (2010, 2012)	2 (2007, 2009)
Daiwa Cup Grand Champion	2 (2008, 2009)	
Total	83	33
Continental
Bosai Cup	1 (2011)	
China-Japan Agon Cup	1 (2015)	2 (2005, 2014)
World Mingren		1 (2015)
Total	2	3
International
Asian TV Cup	1 (2013)	
LG Cup		1 (2017)
Total	1	1
Career total
Total	86	37

=== Awards and honours ===
- 2010 Osaka Culture Prize
- 2018 People's Honour Award
- 2022 Medal with Purple Ribbon
