= Zhong Wenjing =

Chinese Go player

Personal information
- Native name: 钟文靖 (Chinese)
- Full name: Zhong Wenjing
- Born: 25 September 1990 (age 35) China

Sport
- Turned pro: 2001
- Rank: 5 dan
- Affiliation: Chinese Weiqi Association

Zhong Wenjing (Chinese: 钟文靖; pinyin: Zhōng Wénjìng; born 25 September 1990) is a Chinese professional Go player.

He won the 23rd CCTV Cup in 2011.

== Promotion record ==
Rank	Year	Notes
1 dan	2001	
2 dan	2004	
3 dan	2005	
4 dan	2006	
5 dan	2007	
6 dan		
7 dan		
8 dan		
9 dan		

== Career record ==
- 2006: 34 wins, 21 losses
- 2007: 32 wins, 15 losses
- 2008: 30 wins, 22 losses
- 2009: 26 wins, 19 losses
- 2010: 28 wins, 22 losses
- 2011: 18 wins, 9 losses

== Titles and runners-up ==
Domestic
Title	Wins	Runners-up
CCTV Cup	1 (2011)	
Total	1	0
