= Hon'inbō Genjō =

Japanese Go player

Honinbō Genjō
Personal information
- Native name: 本因坊元丈 (Japanese)
- Full name: Honinbō Genjō
- Born: 1775 Japan
- Died: 1832 (aged 56–57) Japan

Sport
- Rank: 8 dan

Honinbō Genjō (本因坊元丈; 1775–1832) was a professional Go player.

== Biography ==
Genjō was the eleventh Hon'inbō. His rival and great friend was Yasui Chitoku, who had advanced to 8 dan at the same time as Genjō. Both were at the level of Meijin strength, but their respect for each other was so great, neither took the Meijin post, since there could only be one Meijin.

== Notes ==
1. - This information was found here.

Preceded by Hon'inbō Retsugen	Hon'inbō; 1809–1839	Succeeded by Hon'inbō Jōwa
