= Honorary Go titles =

Professional Go players in Japan are given the title of "Honorary" (or "Lifetime") title holder if they either win the title ten times in a row, or have won the title five times in a row or ten times in total and reach the age of 60 years or retire. Below is a list of the honorary title holders and which title they are honored for.

== Honorary Kiseis ==
- Fujisawa Hideyuki won the Kisei 6 times in a row from 1976 to 1982.
- Kobayashi Koichi won the Kisei 8 times in a row from 1986 to 1993.
- Iyama Yuta won the Kisei 9 times in a row 2013 to 2021.

== Honorary Meijins ==
- Cho Chikun won the Meijin 5 times in a row from 1980 to 1984.
- Kobayashi Koichi won the Meijin 7 times in a row from 1988 to 1994.

== Honorary Honinbos ==
- Takagawa Kaku won the Honinbo 9 times in a row from 1952 to 1960.
- Sakata Eio won the Honinbo 7 times in a row from 1961 to 1967.
- Ishida Yoshio won the Honinbo 5 times in a row from 1971 to 1975.
- Cho Chikun won the Honinbo 10 times in a row from 1989 to 1998.
- Iyama Yuta won the Honinbo 11 times in a row from 2012 to 2022.

These players are called the 22nd / 23rd / 24th / 25th / 26th Honinbo, respectively.

== Honorary Judans ==
- There have been no Honorary Judans.

== Honorary Tengens ==
- Rin Kaiho won the Tengen 5 times in a row from 1988 to 1993.
- Iyama Yuta won the Tengen 5 times in a row from 2015 to 2019.

== Honorary Ozas ==
- Kato Masao won the Oza 8 times in a row from 1982 to 1989.
- Iyama Yuta won the Oza 10 times overall in 2012, 2013, 2015–2018, 2021-2024.

== Honorary Goseis ==
- Otake Hideo won the Gosei 6 times in a row from 1980 to 1985.
- Kobayashi Koichi won the Gosei 6 times in a row from 1988 to 1993.
- Iyama Yuta won the Gosei 6 times in a row from 2012 to 2017 and 5 times in a row from 2021 to 2025.
