= Huang Yizhong =

Chinese professional Go player (born 1981)

Personal information
- Native name: 黄奕中 (Chinese); Huáng Yìzhōng (Pinyin)
- Full name: Huang Yizhong
- Born: August 24, 1981 (age 44) Changsha, China

Sport
- Teacher: Luo Jianwen
- Rank: 7 dan
- Affiliation: Chinese Weiqi Association

Huang Yizhong (born August 24, 1981) is a Chinese professional Go player.

== Biography ==
Huang began playing Go at the age of 7. By the time he turned 11, he had entered his province's Go team. At 14, he was a part of the National Youth Go Team. Huang turned professional in 1994, a year before joining the team. He is currently 7 dan, since 2008. His biggest accomplishment was winning the Tianyuan title in 2002 over Chang Hao, which ended Chang Hao's five year-run with the title. However, Huang lost the title the next year to Gu Li, who has now held it for four years straight.

== Past titles and runners-up ==
Title	Years Held
Current	1
(China) Tianyuan	2002

Title	Years Lost
Current	3
(China) Tianyuan	2003
(China) Ahan Tongshan Cup	2002
(China) Xinren Wang	2001
Continental	2
China-Japan Tengen	2002
(South Korea) China-Korea Tengen	2002
