= Tang Li (Go player) =

Chinese Go player

Personal information
- Native name: 唐莉 (Chinese); Táng Lì (Pinyin)
- Full name: Tang Li
- Born: Chongqing, China

Sport
- Rank: 1 dan
- Affiliation: Chinese Weiqi Association

Tang Li (Chinese: 唐莉; pinyin: Táng Lì) is a Chinese professional Go player.

== Biography ==
Tang started learning Go at the age of 6. She became a professional at the age of 16, in 1998. In that same year she won 2nd place at the National Youth Women tournament, along with 2nd place at the National Sports Meeting tournament.
