= Norio Kudo =

Japanese Go player

Personal information
- Native name: 工藤紀夫 (Japanese)
- Full name: Norio Kudo
- Born: August 2, 1940 (age 85) Hirosaki, Japan

Sport
- Turned pro: 1955
- Teacher: Nobuaki Maeda
- Rank: 9 dan
- Affiliation: Nihon Ki-in

Norio Kudo (工藤 紀夫, Kudō Norio; born August 2, 1940) is a professional Go player.

== Biography ==
Kudo turned professional in 1955 and was promoted to 9 dan in 1976. Although he did not win many tournaments, he was known for teaching Go to many people, even if they were just starting to learn, or were about to turn 1 dan. He succeeded the late Masao Kato as president of the International Go Federation in 2005.

== Promotion record ==
Rank	Year	Notes
1 dan	1955	
2 dan	1955	
3 dan	1958	
4 dan	1959	
5 dan	1961	
6 dan	1963	
7 dan	1966	
8 dan	1969	
9 dan	1976	

== Titles & runners-up ==
Title	Years Held
Current	2
(Japan) Tengen	1997
(Japan) Oza	1977

Title	Years Lost
Current	4
(Japan) Tengen	1998, 1999
(Japan) Oza	1978
(Japan) Gosei	1985
Defunct	2
(Japan) Shin-Ei	1970
(Japan) Hayago Championship	1976
Continental	1
China-Japan Tengen	1998

Preceded by Masao Kato	President of the International Go Federation; 2005 – 2007	Succeeded by Hiromu Okabe
