= China-Japan Agon Cup =

The China-Japan Agon Cup is a Go competition.

== Outline ==
The China-Japan Agon Cup is a single-game match held each year between the winner of the Agon Kiriyama Cup in Japan and the Ahan Tongshan Cup in China. It is sponsored by Agon Shu. As of 2024, the winner's prize is 5 million yen, and the runner-up's prize is 2 million yen.

== Past winners and runners-up ==
Edition	Year	Winner	Runner-up
1st	1999	(Japan) Kobayashi Kōichi	(China) Ma Xiaochun
2nd	2000	(Japan) Cho Sonjin	(China) Zhou Heyang
3rd	2001	(Japan) Cho Sonjin	(China) Liu Jing
4th	2002	(Japan) Cho Chikun	(China) Yu Bin
5th	2003	(China) Gu Li	(Japan) Kato Masao
6th	2004	(China) Zhou Heyang	(Japan) Hane Naoki
7th	2005	(China) Gu Li	(Japan) Iyama Yuta
8th	2006	(China) Liu Xing	(Japan) Cho U
9th	2007	(China) Liu Xing	(Japan) Cho U
10th	2008	(China) Gu Li	(Japan) Cho U
11th	2009	(China) Sun Tengyu	(Japan) Hane Naoki
12th	2010	(China) Qiu Jun	(Japan) Yamashita Keigo
13th	2011	(China) Piao Wenyao	(Japan) Iyama Yuta
14th	2012	(China) Gu Li	(Japan) Cho U
15th	2013	(China) Lian Xiao	(Japan) Murakawa Daisuke
16th	2014	(China) Ke Jie	(Japan) Iyama Yuta
17th	2015	(Japan) Iyama Yuta	(China) Huang Yunsong
18th	2016	(China) Ke Jie	(Japan) Kono Rin
19th	2017	(China) Tuo Jiaxi	(Japan) Mutsuura Yuta
20th	2018	(China) Gu Zihao	(Japan) Ichiriki Ryo
21st	2019	(Japan) Cho U	(China) Fan Tingyu
22nd	2021	(China) Gu Zihao	(Japan) Hsu Chia-yuan
23rd	2022	(China) Li Qincheng	(Japan) Hirata Tomoya
24th	Mar 2024	(China) Yang Dingxin	(Japan) Ichiriki Ryo
25th	Dec 2024	(China) Chen Zijian	(Japan) Ichiriki Ryo
26th	2025	(China) Wang Xinghao	(Japan) Ichiriki Ryo
