= Lin Haifeng =

Lin Haifeng may refer to:

- Rin Kaiho (born 1942), Taiwanese Go player
- Lamb Hoi Fong (born 1967), Hong Kong singer and actor
