= Kunio Ishii =

Japanese Go player

Personal information
- Native name: 石井邦生 (Japanese)
- Full name: Kunio Ishii
- Born: October 20, 1941 (age 84) Fukuoka, Japan

Sport
- Turned pro: 1956
- Teacher: Hokosawa Senjin
- Pupil: Iyama Yuta
- Rank: 9 dan
- Affiliation: Nihon Ki-in

Kunio Ishii (石井邦生, Ishii Kunio; born October 20, 1941 in Fukuoka, Japan) is a professional Go player.

== Biography ==
Ishii became an insei in 1954, then a professional in 1956 under the guidance of his teacher Hokosawa Senjin. By 1978, he was at the highest rank of order, 9 dan. Although he competed in countless tournaments during his time, he was never able to win any. He is the teacher of Iyama Yuta.

== Promotion record ==
Rank	Year	Notes
1 dan	1956	
2 dan		
3 dan		
4 dan		
5 dan		
6 dan		
7 dan		
8 dan		
9 dan	1978	

== Past runners-up ==
Title	Years Lost
Defunct	1
(Japan) Shin-Ei	1969
