= Hon'inbō Retsugen =

Japanese Go player

Honinbo Retsugen
Personal information
- Native name: 本因坊烈元 (Japanese)
- Full name: Honinbo Retsugen
- Born: 1750 Japan
- Died: 1808 (aged 57–58) Japan

Sport

Honinbo Retsugen (本因坊烈元, 1750–1808) was a Japanese professional go player, and tenth head of the Hon'inbō house.

== Biography ==
The period of the second half of the eighteenth century, as far as the game of go in Japan is concerned, is lacking in distinguishing features. It is short on both technical innovation and outstanding individuals. Some authors, for example John Fairbairn, have suggested that in this era the levels in China and in Japan were quite close, though since Japan was strictly closed this can only be argued on comparison of existing game records in very different styles.

Retsugen was on the receiving end of the brilliance of the one player of the era who still has a high reputation, Yasui Senchi. Senchi was a pioneer of the kind of centrally-oriented play later revived and refined as shinfuseki in the 1930s.

Preceded by Hon'inbō Satsugen	Honinbo; 1788–1808	Succeeded by Honinbo Genjo
