= Hon'inbō Chihaku =

Japanese Go player

Personal information
- Native name: 本因坊知伯 (Japanese)
- Full name: Hon'inbō Chihaku
- Born: 1710 Japan
- Died: 1733 (aged 22–23) Japan

Sport
- Rank: 6 dan

Hon'inbō Chihaku (本因坊知伯, 1710–1733) was a Japanese professional go player, and the sixth head of the Hon'inbō house.

He was a nephew of Hon'inbō Dōchi. He had died at around age 22 or 23, before an official heir had been appointed.

== Oshirogo ==
- 1722 against Inoue Insetsu Inseki (B with three stones, won)
- 1723 against Hayashi Bonkyu (B with two stones, jigo)
- 1725 against Hayashi Incho (B with two stones, W), against Inoue Yuseki (B, lost)
- 1726 against Inoue Insetsu Inseki (B, jigo)
- 1727 against Yasui Senkaku, (B, jigo)
- 1728 against Hayashi Incho, (B, won)
- 1730 against Inoue Shunseki (W, lost)
- 1731 against Inoue Shunseki, (B, won)
- 1733 against Inoue Shunseki (W, lost)

| Preceded by Hon'inbō Dōchi | Hon'inbō; 1727–1733 | Succeeded by Hon'inbō Shūhaku |
