= Masao Sugiuchi =

Japanese Go player (1920–2017)

Personal information
- Native name: 杉内雅男 (Japanese)
- Full name: Masao Sugiuchi
- Nickname: The God of Go
- Born: October 20, 1920 Miyazaki, Japan
- Died: November 21, 2017 (aged 97) Tokyo, Japan

Sport
- Turned pro: 1941
- Teacher: Ichiro Inoue
- Rank: 9 dan
- Affiliation: Nihon Ki-in

Masao Sugiuchi (杉内雅男, Sugiuchi Masao; October 20, 1920 – November 21, 2017) was a professional Go player.

== Biography ==
Born in Miyazaki, Japan, in 1920, Sugiuchi became a professional in 1941. By 1959, he had reached 9 dan. His nickname was "the God of Go" (Japanese 碁の神様, Go no Kami-sama) because of his serious style and strait-laced personality. In December 2004, he became the oldest Nihon Ki-in professional to reach 800 career wins. He was married to Kazuko Sugiuchi (née Honda), one of three professional go-playing sisters, who ended her own career as a professional Go player in 2025, at the age of 98.

Masao Sugiuchi died in Tokyo on November 21, 2017, at the age of 97.

== Runners-up ==
Title	Years Lost
Current	4
(Japan) Honinbo	1954, 1958
(Japan) Tengen	1976
(Japan) NHK Cup	1982
