= Hon'inbō Dōchi =

Japanese Go player

Personal information
- Native name: 本因坊道知 (Japanese)
- Full name: Hon'inbō Dōchi
- Born: 1690 Japan
- Died: 1727 (aged 36–37) Japan

Sport
- Teacher: Hon'inbō Dōsaku
- Rank: 9 dan

Hon'inbō Dōchi (本因坊道知, 1690–1727) was a professional Go player.

== Biography ==
Dōchi learned to play Go at the age of 7. A short two years thereafter, he had become a disciple of Hon'inbō Dōsaku, the strongest player of his time. He became very strong under Dosaku, eventually reaching 6 dan. After Dosaku died in 1702, Dōchi was passed on to Inoue Dōsetsu Inseki. By 1719, he had advanced to 8 dan, the highest rank at the time.

Dōchi became the 5th Hon'inbō in 1702, and Meijin Godoroko in 1721. He served as Honinbō for twenty-five years (1702–1727) and Meijin for 6 years (1721–1727).

He played in an international match against a visiting Ryukyuan player, the Satonushi of Yara. He is famous for his brilliant endgame plays, including a classic example of semedori (forcing an opponent to capture dead stones ), exhibited in a 1705 game against Yasui Senkaku. This was in a grudge match, since there had been bad blood between the Honinbos and Yasuis since Yasui Sanchi was turned out of his official positions in favour of Hon'inbō Dōsaku. Yasui Senkaku had originally refused to play the relatively untested Dōchi; the match had been set up by Ohashi Sokei, the shogidokoro, who was a conventional go-between, and the celebrated game occurred in his official residence. It was reproduced, according to the custom of the time, as a castle go game.

The next year he played a jubango against Dōsetsu, but lost heavily 3½–6½ taking Black (he was 6 dan at the time, Dōsetsu 8 dan).

== Notes ==
Preceded by Inoue Dōsetsu Inseki	Meijin; 1677–1702	Succeeded by Hon'inbō Satsugen
Preceded by Hon'inbō Dōsaku	Hon'inbō; 1702–1727	Succeeded by Hon'inbō Chihaku
