= Koichi Kobayashi =

Japanese Go player (born 1952)

Personal information
- Native name: 小林光一 (Japanese)
- Full name: Koichi Kobayashi
- Born: September 10, 1952 (age 73) Asahikawa City, Japan

Sport
- Turned pro: 1967
- Teacher: Kitani Minoru
- Pupil: Rin Kono
- Rank: 9 dan
- Affiliation: Nihon Ki-in

Koichi Kobayashi (小林 光一, こばやし こういち, Kobayashi Kōichi; born September 10, 1952) is a Japanese Go player. He is one of the 'Six Supers' who championed Japanese Go in the last three decades of Japanese Go.

== Biography ==
Koichi Kobayashi was born in Asahikawa, Japan. In 1965, he came to Tokyo to be a disciple of Minoru Kitani. He studied along with Cho Chikun, Masao Kato, Yoshio Ishida, and Masaki Takemiya. He went on to marry the daughter of his teacher, Reiko Kitani (1939–1996), a 6-dan who has won the All-Japan Women's Championship several times. Together they had a daughter, Izumi Kobayashi, who is now one of the leading female Go players in Japan. Kobayashi is one of the few Go players who have won more than 1,200 professional games. Kobayashi's rivalry with Cho Chikun has continued for some time and they frequently play against each other.

== Career ==
Two years after joining Kitani Minoru's dojo, Kobayashi was promoted to be a 1-dan professional. His first tournament victory came from the 4th Shin Ei in 1972. In 1976, he won his first major title, Tengen.

== Promotion record ==
Rank	Year	Notes
1 dan	1967	
2 dan	1967	
3 dan	1968	
4 dan	1969	
5 dan	1970	
6 dan	1972	
7 dan	1974	
8 dan	1977	
9 dan	1979	

== Titles and runners-up ==
Kobayashi is Honorary Kisei, Honorary Meijin and Honorary Gosei. He ranks #3 in the total number of titles in Japan.

Domestic
Title	Wins	Runners-up
Kisei	8 (1986–1993)	2 (1994, 1999)
Meijin	8 (1985, 1988–1994)	3 (1986, 1995, 1997)
Honinbo		4 (1982, 1990, 1991, 1992)
Tengen	6 (1976, 1984–1986, 1998, 1999)	5 (1981, 1987, 1990, 1995, 2000)
Oza		2 (1985, 1992)
Judan	5 (1984–1986, 1999, 2000)	4 (1987, 1992, 1994, 2001)
Gosei	9 (1988–1993, 1999, 2001, 2002)	3 (1994, 2000, 2003)
Agon Cup	1 (1999)	1 (2004)
Ryusei	3 (1997, 2002, 2003)	
NHK Cup	2 (1986, 2004)	1 (1997)
Shinjin-O	2 (1976, 1977)	
NEC Cup	3 (1995, 1999, 2004)	
Daiwa Cup		1 (2008)
Kakusei	3 (1994, 1997, 2001)	2 (1987, 2002)
Hayago Championship	4 (1972, 1981, 1986, 1997)	5 (1982, 1983, 1985, 2000, 2001)
Shin-Ei	2 (1972, 1975)	2 (1974, 1979)
Prime Minister Cup	3 (1972, 1974, 1976)	
Total	59	35
International
Fujitsu Cup	1 (1997)	1 (1995)
Total	1	1
Continental
China-Japan Meijin	5 (1988–1991, 1993)	2 (1992, 1994)
China-Japan Tengen	1 (2000)	1 (1999)
China-Japan Agon Cup	1 (1999)	
Total	7	3
Career total
Total	67	39
