= China–Japan Tengen =

The China–Japan Tengen was a professional go competition. It was played between Japan's Tengen titleholder and China's Tianyuan titleholder each year in a best-of-three match. The competition was held 15 times, from 1988 to 2002. It was discontinued the following year.

== Results ==
Year	Winner	Score	Runner-up
1988	(Japan) Cho Chikun	2–0	(China) Liu Xiaoguang
1989	(Japan) Cho Chikun	2–0	(China) Liu Xiaoguang
1990	(Japan) Rin Kaiho	2–1	(China) Liu Xiaoguang
1991	(Japan) Rin Kaiho	2–1	(China) Nie Weiping
1992	(China) Nie Weiping	2–0	(Japan) Rin Kaiho
1993	(China) Liu Xiaoguang	2–0	(Japan) Rin Kaiho
1994	(China) Ma Xiaochun	2–0	(Japan) Rin Kaiho
1995	(China) Ma Xiaochun	2–0	(Japan) Ryu Shikun
1996	(China) Ma Xiaochun	2–0	(Japan) Ryu Shikun
1997	(China) Chang Hao	2–0	(Japan) Ryu Shikun
1998	(China) Chang Hao	2–0	(Japan) Norio Kudo
1999	(China) Chang Hao	2–1	(Japan) Koichi Kobayashi
2000	(Japan) Koichi Kobayashi	2–1	(China) Chang Hao
2001	(China) Chang Hao	2–0	(Japan) Ryu Shikun
2002	(Japan) Naoki Hane	2–0	(China) Huang Yizhong

== See also ==
- China–Korea Tengen
- List of professional Go tournaments
