= Yi Qiu =

Chinese go grandmaster active during the early Warring States period

- Born: State of Qi (modern Shandong, China)
- Known for: First recorded weiqi (go) player

Yi Qiu (Chinese: 弈秋; pinyin: Yì Qiū; Wade–Giles: I Ch'iu) was a Chinese weiqi (go) grandmaster active during the early Warring States period, described as one of the best in his era. He was the first recorded weiqi player in history, having been mentioned in an anecdote from the ca. 300 BC text Mencius.

== Biography ==
Yi Qiu was a native of the state of Qi, and lived during the start of the Warring States period (475–221 BC). Originally named Qiu (his surname is unknown), he was so brilliant at weiqi − it was said that nobody had ever defeated him − that the honorific prefix of Yi (弈, an ancient term for Weiqi) was added to his name. He was also lauded as the "finest Yi player of the whole state" (通国之善弈者); Weiqi historians have given him the honorary title of "Guoshou". Given his tremendous skills, scores of weiqi enthusiasts wished to become Yi Qiu's proteges, and he was most obliging to take in disciples, given his "benevolent" character.

An anecdote titled "Two Students Learn Weiqi" (二子學弈), collected in the ca. 300 BC philosophical book Mencius, revolves around Yi Qiu and his two disciples, whose attitudes were in stark contrast with one another. The first student was easily distracted, whereas the other was focused and diligent in studying weiqi. Consequently, the former found no success whereas the latter excelled in the game. Mencius used this tale to expound that even a simple game like Weiqi demands one's full attention. This is also the earliest known historical reference to weiqi, making Yi Qiu the first recorded weiqi player in history.
