= Ryu Shikun =

South Korean Go player

Personal information
- Native name: 류시훈 (Korean); 柳時熏 (Korean); Ryu Sihun (Revised Romanization); Ryu Sihun (McCune–Reischauer)
- Full name: Ryu Shikun
- Born: December 8, 1971 (age 54) Seoul, South Korea

Sport
- Turned pro: 1988
- Teacher: Kweon Kap-yong, Yusuke Oeda
- Rank: 9 dan
- Affiliation: Nihon Ki-in

Ryu Shikun (柳時熏, born December 8, 1971, in Seoul, South Korea) is a professional Go player.

== Biography ==
Ryu Shikun is a Go player who grew up in Seoul. He moved to Japan at age 15, and just 2 years later he turned professional. He was promoted to 9 dan in 2003.

== Titles & runners-up ==
Title	Years Held
Current	6
(Japan) Tengen	1994–1996, 2000
(Japan) Oza	1996
(Japan) NEC Cup	2003
Defunct	2
(Japan) Shin-Ei	1992
(Japan) NEC Shun-Ei	1994
Total	8

runners-up	Years Lost
Current	8
(Japan) Kisei	2002
(Japan) Honinbo	1996
(Japan) Tengen	1997, 2001
(Japan) Oza	1997
(Japan) NEC Cup	2005
(Japan) Shinjin-O	1991
(Japan) Ryusei	1993
Defunct	1
(Japan) NEC Shun-Ei	1993
Continental	4
China-Japan Tengen	1995–1997, 2001
Total	13

== See also ==
- Go players
