= Qian Yuping =

Chinese professional Go player (born 1966)

Personal information
- Native name: 錢宇平 (Chinese)
- Full name: Qian Yuping
- Born: October 6, 1966 (age 59) Shanghai, China

Sport
- Turned pro: 1985 (full time)
- Teacher: Qiu Bairui
- Rank: 9 dan
- Affiliation: Zhongguo Qiyuan

Qian Yuping (simplified Chinese: 钱宇平; traditional Chinese: 錢宇平; pinyin: Qián Yǔpíng; born October 6, 1966) is a Chinese professional Go player.

== Biography ==
Qian was born in Shanghai, China. He started playing Go when he was 6 years old. In 1987, he reached 9 dan, the highest rank. At the time he was one of the youngest 9 dans. A year later, he won his first title, the National Go Individual. In 1991, he made it all the way to the final of the Fujitsu Cup, but could not play for health reasons.

Qian was one of China's best players during the 1990s.

== Past titles & Runners-up ==
| Title | Years Held |
|---|---|
| Current | 3 |
| (China) CCTV Cup | 1990, 1992 |
| (China) National Go Individual | 1988 |
| Defunct | 1 |
| (China) Qiwang | 1994 |

| Title | Years Lost |
|---|---|
| Current | 3 |
| (China) Tianyuan | 1990 |
| (China) CCTV Cup | 1994 |
| (China) National Go Individual | 1990 |
| (China) New Sports Cup | 1983 |
| Defunct | 1 |
| (China) Qiwang | 1995 |
| Continental | 1 |
| (Japan) (South Korea) (China) (Taiwan) Asian TV Cup | 1994 |
| International | 1 |
| (Japan) (South Korea) (China) (Taiwan) (Europe) (United States) Fujitsu Cup | 1991 |
