= JAL Super Hayago Championship =

The JAL Super Hayago Championship is a Nihon-Kiin Go competition. This tournament was created after the Hayago Championship and Kakusei titles were merged. The winner's purse is 5,000,000 Yen (US$47,000).

== Past winners ==
Date	First Place	Second Place
2003-10-12	Yuki Satoshi	Cho U
2004-10-10	Cho Chikun	Mimura Tomoyasu
