= Cho Son-jin =

South Korean Go player

Cho Sonjin
Personal information
- Native name: 趙善津 (Japanese); チョウソンジン (Japanese); 조선진 (Korean); 趙善津 (Korean); Jo Seonjin (Revised Romanization); Cho Sŏnjin (McCune–Reischauer)
- Full name: Cho Sonjin
- Born: April 18, 1970 (age 56) South Korea

Sport
- Turned pro: 1984
- Teacher: Takeo Ando
- Rank: 9 dan
- Affiliation: Nihon Ki-in

Cho Sonjin (Korean: 조선진; born April 18, 1970) is a professional Go player.

Cho was born in South Korea, but moved to Japan at age 12 in order to become a professional. He accomplished his goal two years later in 1984. He was promoted to 9 dan in 1998. In 1999, he defeated Cho Chikun in the Honinbo, ending Chikun's 10-year run with the title.

== Titles and runners-up ==
Title	Years Held
Current	5
(Japan) Honinbo	1999
(Japan) NEC Cup	2006
(Japan) Agon Cup	2000, 2001
(Japan) Shinjin-O	1991
Defunct	1
(Japan) Shin-Ei	1991
Continental	2
China-Japan Agon Cup	2000, 2001

Title	Years Lost
Current	4
(Japan) Kisei	2001
(Japan) Honinbo	2000
(Japan) Tengen	2002
(Japan) Shinjin-O	1995
International	1
(South Korea) (Japan) (China) (Taiwan) Samsung Cup	1999

== See also ==
- Go players
