= List of Go players =

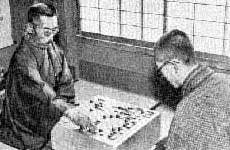
Match between two famous players. Left is Honinbo Shusai, right is Go Seigen. (Game record of the famous match here)

This article gives an overview of well-known professional and amateur players of the board game Go throughout the ages. The page has been divided into sections based on the era in which the Go players played and the country in which they played. As this was not necessarily their country of birth, a flag of that country precedes every player's name. For a complete list of player articles, see Category:Go players.

The important dates that this separation is based on are:

- The establishment of the Four go houses at the start of the Tokugawa Shogunate.
- The demise of the houses in the Meiji Period (end 19th century) followed by their replacement by the Nihon Kiin in 1924.
- The start of international tournament Go in 1989

A Japanese census on Go players performed in 2002 estimates that over 24 million people worldwide play Go, most of whom live in Asia. Most of the players listed on this article are professionals, though some top level amateurs have been included. Players famous for achievements outside Go are listed in their own section.

== Prior to 17th century ==
Wei Qi was recorded throughout the history of China. The first record of Wei Qi player was by Mencius.

=== China ===
| Origin | Name | DOB–DOD | Peak rank | Notes |
|---|---|---|---|---|
| | Yi Qiu (弈秋) | circa 350 BCE | Guoshou | First recorded Wei Qi player. He was commonly known as Qiu (秋) the Wei Qi player (Yi 弈, which is the original name of Wei Qi). He was a native of the state Qi 齊 and mentioned by Mencius (372 BC – 289 BC) in 《孟子·告子章句上》: 今夫弈之为数，小数也。不专心致志，则不得也。弈秋，通国之善弈者也。使弈秋诲二人弈，其一人专心致志，惟弈秋之为听；一人虽听之，一心以为有鸿鹄将至，思援弓缴而射之，虽与俱学，弗若之矣！ He was called "通国之善弈者", literally "the finest Yi player of the whole state", i.e. Guoshou. |
| | Yan Wu (嚴武) | circa 200 CE – 250 CE | Qishen, 1 pin/品 | Scholar name Zi Qin子卿 Son of Wu Minister Yan Jun 嚴畯. Mentioned in The Record of Wu 《吴录》：“严武字子卿，卫尉畯再从子也，围棋莫与为辈。” |
| | Ma Lang (馬朗) | 200 CE – 250 CE | Qishen, 1 pin/品 | Scholar name Su Ming 綏明, same time as Yan Wu. |
| | Wang Kang (王抗) | circa 424 CE – 483 CE | Guoshou, 1 pin/品 | Member of the famous Wang clan of Lan Xie County, recorded in History of the Southern Dynasties 《南史·萧思话传》. |
| | Fan Ning'er (范宁儿) | circa 424 CE – 483 CE | Guoshou, 1 pin/品 | Member of the delegates of Northern Wei to Southern Qi, he played a Wei Qi match against Wang Kang under the order of Southern Qi's Wu Emperor Xiao Ze(齊武帝蕭賾, reign 482 CE – 493 CE), and won the match (recorded in <<北史·魏书·蒋少游传>>). |
| | Emperor Wu of Liang (梁武帝萧衍) | 464 CE – 549 CE | Guoshou, yi pin/逸品 (super strong 1 pin) | Emperor Wu of Southern Liang dynasty, personal name Xiao Yan, was a member of the Xiao clan of Lang Ning and founder of the Southern Liang dynasty. His reign was 502 CE – 549 CE), famous for his Wei Qi skill, he was recorded in his bibliography as yi pin (strong 1 pin) by later historian in 《梁书·武帝纪》. |

== 17th through 19th centuries ==
In the 17th, 18th and 19th century, Go was popular in both Japan (Edo period) and China (period of the Qing dynasty). In Korea, a Go variant called Sunjang baduk was played.

=== Japan ===
At the start of the Tokugawa Shogunate, four Go academies were established. This table lists all heads of these houses, as well as some that were appointed heir but died before they became head of the house. Tokugawa also established the post of Godokoro (minister of Go), which was awarded to the strongest player of a generation. Such players were dubbed Meijin (brilliant man), which was considered equal to a 9 dan professional grade. Over the 300-year period covered here, only ten players received the title of Meijin. Several other players (16 total) received the title of Jun-Meijin (half-Meijin), which is considered to equal an 8 dan professional grade and listed as such below. In some houses it was the custom that the head of the house was always named the same according to the iemoto system (家元). All heads of the house Inoue (井上) were named Inseki (因碩), heads of the house Yasui (安井 ) were named Senkaku (仙角) from the 4th head onward, and heads of the house Hayashi (林) were named Monnyu (門入) from the second head onward. To distinguish between these players, the names listed below are the names they had before becoming head of their house, or after their retirement. The house Honinbo (本因坊) had no such tradition, although heads would often take one character from the name of their predecessor into their own name, notably the character Shu (秀) from the 14th head onward.

| Origin | Name | DOB–DOD | Peak rank^{*} | Notes |
|---|---|---|---|---|
| (Japan) | Honinbo Sansa (本因坊算砂) | 1559–1623 | Meijin, 9 dan | Founder and first head of the house Honinbo. |
| (Japan) | Nakamura Doseki (中村道碩) | 1582–1630 | Meijin, 9 dan | Retrospectively seen as founder of the house Inoue. |
| (Japan) | Hayashi Monnyusai (林門入斎) | 1583–1667 | 7 or 8 dan | Founder and first head of the house Hayashi. |
| (Japan) | Yasui Santetsu (安井算哲) | 1589–1652 | 8 dan | Founder and first head of the house Yasui. |
| (Japan) | Inoue Genkaku (井上玄覚) | 1605–1673 | 7 dan | First head of the Inoue house on the unrevised numbering (not counting Nakamura Doseki). |
| (Japan) | Honinbo Sanetsu (本因坊算悦) | 1611–1658 | 8 dan | Second head of the house Honinbo, Jun-Meijin. |
| (Japan) | Yasui Sanchi (安井算知) | 1617–1703 | Meijin, 9 dan | Second head of the house Yasui. |
| (Japan) | Honinbo Doetsu (本因坊道悦) | 1636–1727 | 7 dan | Third head of the house Honinbo. |
| (Japan) | Honinbo Dosaku (本因坊道策) | 1645–1702 | Meijin, 9 dan | Fourth head of the house Honinbo. One of the greatest players of all time, and the first Kisei (go saint); an important influence on go theory. |
| (Japan) | Honinbo Doteki (本因坊道的) | 1669–1690 | 7 dan | Heir to the house Honinbo. Was considered an extremely talented Go prodigy. |
| (Japan) | Hayashi Monnyu (林門入) | 1678–1719 | 6 dan | Second head of the Hayashi house. |
| (Japan) | Honinbo Dochi (本因坊道知) | 1690–1727 | Meijin, 9 dan | Fifth head of the house Honinbo. |
| (Japan) | Honinbo Chihaku (本因坊知伯) | 1710–1733 | 6 dan | Sixth Honinbo. |
| (Japan) | Honinbo Shuhaku (本因坊秀伯) | 1716–1741 | 6 dan | Seventh head of the house Honinbo. |
| (Japan) | Honinbo Satsugen (本因坊察元) | 1733–1788 | Meijin, 9 dan | Ninth head of the house Honinbo. |
| (Japan) | Honinbo Genjo (本因坊元丈) | 1775–1832 | 8 dan | Eleventh head of the house Honinbo. |
| (Japan) | Honinbo Jowa (本因坊丈和) | 1787–1847 | 8 dan | Was dubbed Kisei (go sage), played the famous "Blood Vomiting Game" with Akaboshi Intetsu. |
| (Japan) | Ota Yuzo (太田雄蔵) | 1807–1856 | 7 dan | was a close friend of Honinbo Shusaku and once played a famous sanjubango (30 game match) with him. |
| (Japan) | Intetsu Akaboshi (赤星因徹) | 1810–1835 | 7 dan |
| (Japan) | Honinbo Shusaku (本因坊秀策) | 1829–1862 | 7 dan | One of the greatest players ever, he died young. He was posthumously awarded the title of Kisei (go sage). |
| (Japan) | Honinbo Shuho (本因坊秀甫) | 1838–1886 | 8 dan | Was the founder of Hoensha and the man who taught Go to Oskar Korschelt. |
| (Japan) | Honinbo Shuei (本因坊秀栄) | 1854–1907 | 9 dan | was the 17th and again 19th head of the Honinbo house. Very active and innovative in the 1890s. |
| (Japan) | Honinbo Shusai (本因坊秀哉) | 1874–1940 | 9 dan | was the last and 21st head of "Honinbo" House, and founder of the Nihon Ki-in. |

^{*All ranks are professional dan grades unless otherwise noted.}

=== China ===
| Origin | Name | DOB–DOD | Peak rank | Notes |
|---|---|---|---|---|
| (Qing dynasty) | Guo Wen-nian (過文年) | 1610s–1670s | Guoshou, Qishen, 1 pin/品 | Better known by his scholar name Guo Bai-Nian 過百齡 or Guo Bo-Nian過伯齡. Ancestor of Guo Ti-sheng 過惕生(1907–1989), teacher of Nie Hui-Ping. Author of Wei Qi classic 《官子譜》,《三子譜》 and 《四子譜》. |
| (Qing dynasty) | Huang Longshi (黃龍士) | 1650s–1690s | Guoshou, Qishen, 1 pin/品 | Was considered by Go Seigen to have been at least the level of Honinbo Dosaku. He reached Guoshou* at the age of 16.梁魏今 |
| (Qing dynasty) | Liang Wei-Jin (梁魏今) | 1680s–1760s | Guoshou, Qishen, 1 pin/品 | Pen name Hui Jing 會京. Native of Huaian in northern Jiangsu. Taught both Fan Xiping and Shi Shao-An. |
| (Qing dynasty) | Cheng Lan-Ru (程蘭如) | 1690–1765 | Guoshou, Qishen, 1 pin/品 | Native of She County 歙縣 in southern Anhui. Also known for strong Xiangqi. |
| (Qing dynasty) | Fan Xiping (范西屏) | 1709–1769 | Guoshou, Qishen, 1 pin/品 | Native of Haining, Zhejiang Province. Played 13 games with Shi Xiping in which 10 games survived in records, with score 5–5. Author of 《桃花泉弈譜》,《二子譜》and《四子譜》. |
| (Qing dynasty) | Shi Shaoan (施紹暗) | 1710–1769 | Guoshou, Qishen, 1 pin/品 | Better known by his scholar name Shi Xiangxia 施襄夏 and pen name Shi Ding-En 施定庵. Also Native of Haining, Zhejiang Province. |

*Players could achieve the level of Guoshou (literally National Hand), which is best in the nation and ranked 1 pin 品. This title is a derivation of Mencius description of Yi Qiu (弈秋), Qiu the Yi player in 《孟子·告子章句上》: 今夫弈之为数，小数也。不专心致志，则不得也。弈秋，通国之善弈者也。使弈秋诲二人弈，其一人专心致志，惟弈秋之为听；一人虽听之，一心以为有鸿鹄将至，思援弓缴而射之，虽与俱学，弗若之矣！as being "通国之善弈者", literally the finest Yi player of the whole nation. It is considered to be equal to the Japanese title of Meijin. The term Qi Sheng (棋圣) was first mentioned by Ge Hong (葛洪) in 《抱朴子》：“棋之无敌者，则谓之棋圣。” The literal meaning is the Invincible Qi player is called the Saint of Qi (Qi Sheng). Note that both Guoshou and Qisheng were not tournament winner titles; instead they were honorific titles used by Wei Qi players and historians respectively to refer to the best players who were invincible in highest graded tournaments. Guoshou was the normal term used to refer to the promo player while he was alive, whereas Qisheng was used more as posthumous fame. The ranking of players began in West Han dynasty (2nd century BCE) and formally recognized by the Governments during the North and South Dynasties Period (3rd to 6th century CE). There were 9 ranks called pin 品 in the system, the same as the ranking system for government officials. The lowest rank was 9 pin, then 8 pin, etc. up to 1 pin. The difference of the lower 5 pin was about 1 zi (子, piece or stone), and the difference between the top 4 pin was half zi.

== 20th century ==
=== Japan ===
| Origin | Name | DOB–DOD | Peak rank | Notes |
|---|---|---|---|---|
| (Japan) | Kensaku Segoe (瀬越憲作) | 1889–1972 | 9 dan | was the teacher of three of the greatest players of 20th century: Utaro Hashimoto (Japan), Go Seigen (China) and Cho Hunhyun (Korea). |
| (Japan) | Kaoru Iwamoto (岩本薫) | 1902–1999 | 9 dan | founder of Iwamoto Foundation for Go promotion in foreign countries. |
| (Japan) | Utaro Hashimoto (橋本宇太郎) | 1907–1994 | 9 dan | was the founder of the Kansai Ki-in. A student of Segoe |
| (Japan) | Minoru Kitani (木谷実) | 1909–1975 | 9 dan | was a great friend and rival to Go Seigen. Go and Kitani were the co-authors of the Shinfuseki or "New Opening", a great advance in go opening theory. Most prolific teacher ever. Pupils include Masao Kato, Yoshio Ishida, Hideo Otake, Kim In, Cho Chikun, Masaki Takemiya and Koichi Kobayashi. |
| (Japan) | Toshihiro Shimamura (島村俊廣) | 1912–1991 | 9 dan |
| (Japan) | Dogen Handa (半田道玄) | 1914–1974 | 9 dan |
| (Republic of China (1912–1949)) | Go Seigen (呉清源) | 1914–2014 | 9 dan | Wu Qingyuan in Chinese. He is considered to be one of the greatest players of all time. He had a superb match play record, before the current era dominated by annual titles. Co-author of the groundbreaking work on the opening theory, Shinfuseki. |
| (Japan) | Kaku Takagawa (高川格) | 1915–1986 | 9 dan | The first of only five players to receive the Honorary Honinbo title, thus known as the 22nd Honinbo. |
| (Japan) | Hosai Fujisawa (藤沢朋斎) | 1919–1993 | 9 dan | one of the greatest players of the 1960s. |
| (Japan) | Eio Sakata (坂田栄男) | 1920–2010 | 9 dan | his nicknames include "Razor Sakata", the "Master of myoushu" (brilliant move). He was the previous holder of most championship titles with 64 wins. |
| (Japan) | Masao Sugiuchi (杉内雅男) | 1920–2017 | 9 dan | nicknamed "the God of Go" for his serious attitude towards Go. Affiliate of the Nihon Ki-in. |
| (Japan) | Takeo Kajiwara (梶原武雄) | 1923–2009 | 9 dan | one of the "three crows". |
| (Japan) | Hideyuki Fujisawa (藤沢秀行) | 1925–2009 | 9 dan | was awarded the Honorary Kisei title after winning the Kisei 6 times in a row. Won the Oza title at the age of 67. |
| (Japan) | Toshiro Yamabe (山部俊郎) | 1926–2000 | 9 dan | one of the "three crows". |
| (Japan) | Keizo Suzuki (鈴木圭三) | 1927–1945 | 3 dan | one of the "three crows". |
| (Japan) | Yasuro Kikuchi (菊池康郎) | 1929–2021 | 8 dan | is the most famous amateur go player in Japan. |
| (Japan) | Shuzo Ohira (大平修三) | 1930–1998 | 9 dan |
| (Japan) | Shoji Hashimoto (橋本昌二) | 1935–2009 | 9 dan | Affiliate of the Kansai Ki-In. |
| (Japan) | Norio Kudo (工藤紀夫) | 1940– | 9 dan | current president for the International Go Federation. Affiliate of the Nihon Ki-In. |
| (Japan) | Kunio Ishii (石井邦生) | 1941– | 9 dan | teacher of Yuta Iyama. |
| (Japan) | Hideo Otake (大竹英雄) | 1942– | 9 dan | Lifetime Gosei. |
| (Taiwan) | Rin Kaiho (林海峰) | 1942– | 9 dan | was one of Go Seigen's students. Known for winning many titles at a young age. Affiliate of the Nihon Ki-in. |
| (Japan) | Yasumasa Hane (羽根泰正) | 1944– | 9 dan | father of Hane Naoki. |
| (Japan) | Kunihisa Honda (本田邦久) | 1945– | 9 dan |
| (Japan) | Masao Kato (加藤正夫) | 1947–2004 | 9 dan | Nicknamed "Kato the Killer", for his masterful, aggressive style. |
| (Japan) | Yoshio Ishida (石田芳夫) | 1948– | 9 dan | is the youngest ever Honinbo winner and one of the strongest players of the 1970s. TV commentator. Affiliate of the Nihon Ki-In. |
| (Japan) | Shuzo Awaji (淡路修三) | 1949– | 9 dan | famous for his Go school. Affiliate of the Nihon Ki-In. |
| (Japan) | Masaki Takemiya (武宮正樹) | 1951– | 9 dan | is famous for his 'cosmic style', aiming for territory in the center of the board rather than the sides. Affiliate of the Nihon Ki-In. |
| (Japan) | Koichi Kobayashi (小林光一) | 1952– | 9 dan | has the third most titles in Japan with 57. Affiliate of the Nihon Ki-In. |
| (South Korea) | Cho Chikun (조치훈, 趙治勳) | 1956– | 9 dan | Cho Chihun in Korean, is among the best players of the 20th century. He won almost half (29 out of 60) of the biggest 3 titles (Honinbo, Kisei, and Meijin tournaments) in 1980–1999, including ten consecutive Honinbo titles for which he is accorded the title of 25th Honinbo. The first to hold all 3 at the same time and the first to have won all seven titles. Passed Sakata in late 2002 for most titles in Japan; thus far have won 70 titles. Affiliate of the Nihon Ki-In. |
| (Taiwan) | O Rissei (王立誠) | 1958– | 9 dan | one of the first Taiwanese Go players to become a professional in Japan. Affiliate of the Nihon Ki-In. |
| (Japan) | Hiroshi Yamashiro (山城宏) | 1958– | 9 dan | Affiliate of the Nihon Ki-In. |
| (Japan) | Satoshi Kataoka (片岡聡) | 1958– | 9 dan | Affiliate of the Nihon Ki-In. |
| (Japan) | Satoru Kobayashi (小林覚) | 1959– | 9 dan | Affiliate of the Nihon Ki-In. |
| (Taiwan) | O Meien (王銘琬) | 1961– | 9 dan | famous for his "Meien-isms", a special way of opening a game. Affiliate of the Nihon Ki-In. |
| (United States) | Michael Redmond (マイケル・レドモンド) | 1963– | 9 dan | is the only (as of February 2008) non-Asian (American) to attain rank of 9-dan. TV commentator for the Japanese network NHK. Affiliate of the Nihon Ki-In. |
| (Japan) | Norimoto Yoda (依田紀基) | 1966– | 9 dan | Has one of the best track records in international tournaments for Japan, having won Samsung Fire Cup and being runners-up in Ing Cup, both in 1996. Affiliate of the Nihon Ki-In. |
| (Japan) | Tomoyasu Mimura (三村智保) | 1969– | 9 dan | Affiliate of the Nihon Ki-In. |
| (South Korea) | Cho Sonjin (조선진, 趙善津) | 1970– | 9 dan | Affiliate of the Nihon Ki-In. |
| (South Korea) | Ryu Shikun (류시훈, 柳時熏) | 1971– | 9 dan | Affiliate of the Nihon Ki-In. |
| (Japan) | Kimio Yamada (山田規三生) | 1972– | 9 dan | Affiliate of the Nihon Ki-In. |
| (Japan) | Satoshi Yuki (結城聡) | 1972– | 9 dan | The third youngest player to become a professional, and second youngest professional for the Kansai Ki-in. Affiliate of the Kansai Ki-In. |
| (Japan) | Hideyuki Sakai (坂井秀至) | 1973– | 8 dan | Won the World Amateur Go Championship in 2000. Promoted to professional at age 28 after winning 4 of 4 "test" games against two strong professionals (2 games each against 5d and 7d). Affiliate of the Kansai Ki-in. |
| (Japan) | Shinji Takao (高尾紳路) | 1976– | 9 dan | Affiliate of the Nihon Ki-in. |
| (Japan) | Naoki Hane (羽根直樹) | 1976– | 9 dan | In 2002, Hane broke the record for fastest promotion to 9 dan in Nihon Ki-in history. Affiliate of the Nihon Ki-in. |
| (Japan) | Keigo Yamashita (山下敬吾) | 1978– | 9 dan | Has an innovative style harking back to shinfuseki. Affiliate of the Nihon Ki-in. |
| (Taiwan) | Cho U (張栩) | 1980– | 9 dan | In 2003, Cho U broke the record for fastest promotion to 9 dan in Nihon Ki-in history. Affiliate of the Nihon Ki-in. |
| (Japan) | Rin Kono (河野臨) | 1981– | 9 dan | Affiliate of the Nihon Ki-In. |
| (Japan) | Yuta Iyama (井山裕太) | 1989– | 9 dan | In 2016, became the first person to hold all seven titles at the same time. Became the youngest title holder ever in 2005 after winning the Agon Cup. Earned the right to be accorded the title of 26th Honinbo upon reaching the age of 60 or on retirement. Affiliate of the Nihon Ki-In. |
| (Japan) | Daisuke Murakawa (村川大介) | 1990– | 9 dan | The youngest Kansai Ki-in pro ever. Affiliate of the Kansai Ki-in. |

==== Women ====
| Origin | Name | DOB–DOD | Peak rank | Notes |
|---|---|---|---|---|
| (Japan) | Reiko Kobayashi (小林禮子) | 1939–1996 | 7 dan | Izumi's mother. Married to Koichi Kobayashi |
| (Japan) | Kikuyo Aoki (青木喜久代) | 1968– | 8 dan | Affiliate of the Nihon Ki-In. |
| (Japan) | Yukari Yoshihara (吉原由香里) | 1973– | 6 dan | The Go player who supervised the production of the manga Hikaru no Go. Affiliate of the Nihon Ki-In. |
| (Japan) | Kaori Chinen (知念かおり) | 1974– | 6 dan | Married to fellow professional go player Yo Kagen in 1997 |
| (Japan) | Izumi Kobayashi (小林泉美) | 1977– | 7 dan | Married to Cho U |
| (Japan) | Kaori Aoba (青葉かおり) | 1978– | 5 dan | First professional to be defeated by a Go engine with a conventional handicap. Affiliate of the Nihon Ki-in. |
| (Japan) | Kana Mannami (万波佳奈) | 1983– | 4 dan | Former Women's Kisei |
| (Taiwan) | Xie Yimin (謝依旻) | 1989– | 7 dan | Taiwanese-born professional Go player in Japan holding the titles of Honorary Female Honinbo and Honorary Female Meijin. |
| (Japan) | Rina Fujisawa (藤沢里菜) | 1998– | 6 dan | Granddaughter of the late Honorary Kisei, Hideyuki Fujisawa. |
| (Japan) | Asami Ueno (上野愛咲美) | 2001– | 4 dan | Former Women's Kisei |
| (Japan) | Sumire Nakamura (仲邑 菫) | 2009– | 3 dan | Youngest pro |

=== China ===
- Note: China formally adopted dan ranking in the early 1980s. Taiwan still uses pin ranking in addition to dan ranking.

| Origin | Name | DoB–DoD | Peak rank | Notes |
|---|---|---|---|---|
| (China) | Chen Zude (陈祖德) | 1944–2012 | 9 dan | was the chairman of Zhongguo Qiyuan from 1992 to 2003 and was former president of the association. Famous for popularizing the Chinese fuseki. |
| (China) | Wu Songsheng (吴淞笙) | 1945–2007 | 9 dan | One of the first three professional 9 dans in China. Dedicated international educator of Go. Honoured guest player at Hanguk Kiwon. Affiliate of Zhongguo Qiyuan. |
| (China) | Nie Weiping (聂卫平) | 1952–2026 | 9 dan | One of the strongest players of 1980s, he led China to victory in several team matches against Japan. Challenged for many top international titles in the late 1980s. Affiliate of the Zhongguo Qiyuan. |
| (China) | Liu Xiaoguang (刘小光) | 1960– | 9 dan | Affiliate of the Zhongguo Qiyuan. |
| (China) | Cao Dayuan (曹大元) | 1962– | 9 dan | Affiliate of the Zhongguo Qiyuan. |
| (China) | Ma Xiaochun (马晓春) | 1962– | 9 dan | A top player in China during the 1990s. Affiliate of the Zhongguo Qiyuan. |
| (China) | Feng Yun (丰云) | 1966– | 9 dan | Second woman ever attain rank of 9-dan. Affiliate of the Zhongguo Qiyuan. |
| (China) | Qian Yuping (錢宇平) | 1966– | 9 dan | Affiliate of the Zhongguo Qiyuan. |
| (China) | Yu Bin (俞斌) | 1967– | 9 dan | Affiliate of the Zhongguo Qiyuan. |
| (China) | Shao Weigang (邵煒剛) | 1973– | 9 dan | Affiliate of the Zhongguo Qiyuan. |
| (China) | Chang Hao (常昊) | 1976– | 9 dan | Affiliate of the Zhongguo Qiyuan. |
| (China) | Zhou Heyang (周鹤洋) | 1976– | 9 dan | Affiliate of the Zhongguo Qiyuan. |
| (China) | Luo Xihe (罗洗河) | 1977– | 9 dan | Affiliate of the Zhongguo Qiyuan. |
| (China) | Wang Lei (王磊) | 1978– | 8 dan | Affiliate of the Zhongguo Qiyuan. |
| (China) | Ding Wei (丁偉) | 1979– | 8 dan | Affiliate of the Zhongguo Qiyuan. |
| (China) | Huang Yizhong (黄奕中) | 1981– | 6 dan | Affiliate of the Zhongguo Qiyuan. |
| (China) | Kong Jie (孔杰) | 1982– | 9 dan | 3 world championship titles. One of strongest players in the World in 2000s. Affiliate of the Zhongguo Qiyuan. |
| (China) | Qiu Jun (邱峻) | 1982– | 8 dan | Affiliate of the Zhongguo Qiyuan. |
| (China) | Tang Li (唐莉) | 1982– | 1 dan | Affiliate of the Zhongguo Qiyuan. |
| (China) | Hu Yaoyu (胡耀宇) | 1982– | 8 dan | Affiliate of the Zhongguo Qiyuan. |
| (China) | Gu Li (古力) | 1983– | 9 dan | 7 World championship titles; One of strongest players in the World in 2000s. He had exceptional record between 2008 and 2010. He lost to Lee Sedol in a Jubango match in 2014. Affiliate of the Zhongguo Qiyuan. |
| (China) | Xie He (谢赫) | 1984– | 5 dan | Affiliate of the Zhongguo Qiyuan. |
| (China) | Liu Xing (刘星) | 1984– | 6 dan | Affiliate of the Zhongguo Qiyuan. |
| (China) | Wang Xi (王檄) | 1984– | 6 dan | Affiliate of the Zhongguo Qiyuan. |
| (China) | Piao Wenyao (朴文堯) | 1988– | 5 dan | Affiliate of the Zhongguo Qiyuan. |
| (China) | Chen Yaoye (陳耀燁) | 1989– | 9 dan | Youngest professional 9 dan at 17 years of age. Affiliate of the Zhongguo Qiyuan. |
| (China) | Li Zhe (李喆) | 1989– | 4 dan | Affiliate of the Zhongguo Qiyuan. |
| (China) | Zhou Ruiyang (周睿羊) | 1991– | 5 dan | Affiliate of the Zhongguo Qiyuan. |

=== Korea ===
| Origin | Name | DOB–DOD | Peak rank | Notes |
|---|---|---|---|---|
| (South Korea) | Cho Nam-chul (조남철, 趙南哲) | 1923–2006 | 9 dan | Founder of the Hanguk Kiwon. |
| (South Korea) | Kang Cheol-min (강철민, 姜哲民) | 1939–2002 | 8 dan |
| (South Korea) | Kim In (김인, 金寅) | 1943–2021 | 9 dan | Strongest player in Korea during 1960s and early 1970s. Affiliate of the Hanguk Kiwon. |
| (South Korea) | Ha Chan-seok (하찬석, 河燦錫) | 1948–2010 | 8 dan | Affiliate of the Hanguk Kiwon. |
| (South Korea) | Jimmy Cha (차민수, 車敏洙) | 1951– | 4 dan | Affiliate of the Hanguk Kiwon. |
| (South Korea) | Cho Hun-hyun (조훈현, 曺薰鉉) | 1953– | 9 dan | The strongest Go player in South Korea during the 1970s and 1980s before the period of dominance by his student Lee Chang-ho. The winner of 11 World titles, including the inaugural edition of the quadrennial Ing Cup in 1989. Last won a World title at the age of 49, at 2003 Samsung Fire Cup. Holder of the most titles by a professional player. Also holder of the most consecutive title defense, winning the Paewang title 16 times in-a-row. |
| (South Korea) | Seo Bong-soo (서봉수, 徐奉洙) | 1953– | 9 dan | was Cho Hunhyun's biggest rival in the '80s. Known for his long list of runner up titles. Won 9 matches in a row in 1997 Jinro Cup to win the title for Korea. Affiliate of the Hanguk Kiwon. |
| (China) | Jiang Zhujiu (장주주, 江鑄久) | 1962– | 9 dan | Affiliate of the Hanguk Kiwon. |
| (China) | Rui Naiwei (루이나이웨이, 芮乃伟) | 1963– | 9 dan | First woman to attain rank of 9-dan and widely considered to be the strongest female player of all time, also won the open Guksu title in 1999. Affiliate of the Hanguk Kiwon. |
| (South Korea) | Yoo Chang-hyuk (유창혁, 劉昌赫) | 1966– | 9 dan | 6 time world champion, one of the strongest players of 1990s. Affiliate of the Hanguk Kiwon. |
| (South Korea) | Janice Kim | 1969– | 3 dan | Affiliate of the Hanguk Kiwon. |
| (South Korea) | Lee Chang-ho (이창호, 李昌鎬) | 1975– | 9 dan | Considered one of the greatest players of all time, he was the strongest player in the world between 1993 and 2005. The student of Cho Hunhyun, he is also credited with expanding the understanding for the endgame. He won record 21 world championships since 1992, the last world title being the 2007 Zhonghuan Cup. Affiliate of the Hanguk Kiwon. |
| (South Korea) | Choi Myung-hoon (최명훈, 崔明勳) | 1975– | 9 dan | Affiliate of the Hanguk Kiwon. |
| (South Korea) | An Cho-young (안조영, 安祚永) | 1979– | 9 dan | Affiliate of the Hanguk Kiwon. |
| (South Korea) | Mok Jin-seok (목진석, 睦鎭碩) | 1980– | 9 dan | Affiliate of the Hanguk Kiwon. |
| (South Korea) | Cho Han-seung (조한승, 趙漢乘) | 1982– | 9 dan | Affiliate of the Hanguk Kiwon. |
| (South Korea) | Lee Se-dol (이세돌; 李世乭) | 1983– | 9 dan | Considered the strongest player in the world after Lee Chang-ho's reign. He beat Gu Li in a Jubango match in 2014. He obtained 18 world championship titles between 2002 and 2015. Played against Google DeepMind's AlphaGo in AlphaGo versus Lee Sedol match in 2016. Affiliate of the Hanguk Kiwon. |
| (South Korea) | Park Jung-sang (박정상, 朴正祥) | 1984– | 9 dan | Affiliate of the Hanguk Kiwon. |
| (South Korea) | Hong Min-pyo (홍민표, 洪旼杓) | 1984– | 5 dan | Affiliate of the Hanguk Kiwon. |
| (South Korea) | Park Seung-hyun (박승현, 朴昇賢) | 1984– | 4 dan | Affiliate of the Hanguk Kiwon. |
| (South Korea) | Choi Cheol-han (최철한, 崔哲澣) | 1985– | 9 dan | Affiliate of the Hanguk Kiwon. |
| (South Korea) | Pak Yeong-hun (박영훈, 朴永訓) | 1985– | 9 dan | A young and established Korean go professional. He reached 9 dan after 5 years, making him the youngest Korean 9 dan professional ever. 3 time world champion. Affiliate of the Hanguk Kiwon. |
| (South Korea) | Kim Dong-hee (김동희, 金東熙) | 1985– | 2 dan | Affiliate of the Hanguk Kiwon. |
| (South Korea) | Won Seong-jin (원성진, 元晟溱) | 1985– | 9 dan | Affiliate of the Hanguk Kiwon. |
| (South Korea) | Song Tae-kon (송태곤, 宋泰坤) | 1986– | 9 dan | Affiliate of the Hanguk Kiwon. |
| (South Korea) | Heo Young-ho (허영호, 許映皓) | 1986– | 5 dan | Affiliate of the Hanguk Kiwon. |
| (South Korea) | Ko Geuntae (고근태, 高根台) | 1987– | 5 dan | Affiliate of the Hanguk Kiwon. |
| (South Korea) | Yun Jun-sang (윤준상, 尹畯相) | 1987– | 6 dan | Affiliate of the Hanguk Kiwon. |
| (South Korea) | Kang Dong-yun (강동윤, 姜東潤) | 1989– | 8 dan | Affiliate of the Hanguk Kiwon. |

=== Taiwan ===
- Note: Taiwan still uses pin ranking in addition to dan ranking.

| Origin | Name | DOB–DOD | Peak rank | Notes |
|---|---|---|---|---|
| (Taiwan) | Zhou Junxun (周俊勳) | 1980– | 9 dan, 1 pin | Affiliate of the Taiwan Qiyuan. |
| (Taiwan) | Lin Zhihan (林至涵) | 1980– | 9 dan | Affiliate of the Taiwan Qiyuan. |
| (Taiwan) | Chen Shien (陳詩淵) | 1985– | 7 dan | Affiliate of the Taiwan Qiyuan. |
| (Taiwan) (Australia) | Joanne Missingham | 1994– | 7 dan | Australian-born Taiwanese professional Go player |

=== United States ===
| Origin | Name | DOB–DOD | Peak rank | Notes |
|---|---|---|---|---|
| United States | Janice Kim | 1969– | 3p | American professional Go player, author, and business-owner |
| United States | Michael Redmond | 1963– | 9 dan | First Westerner to reach 9 dan |

=== Europe ===
| Origin | Name | DOB–DOD | Peak rank | Notes |
|---|---|---|---|---|
| (Austria) | Manfred Wimmer | 1944–1995 | 2p | Born in Austria, became the first western Go professional in 1978, doing so with the Kansai Ki-in. Reached 2p the same year, and later brought Go to Kenya and Madagascar. |
| (Germany) | Hans Reinhard Pietsch | 1968–2003 | 6p | Known for spreading Go around the world. |
| (Romania) | Catalin Taranu | 1973– | 5p | One of Romania's best players and a pro in Japan. Affiliate of the Nihon Ki-In. |
| (Russia) | Alexandre Dinerchtein | 1980– | 3p | The first Russian professional Go player. Affiliate of the Hanguk Kiwon. |
| (Russia) | Svetlana Shikshina | 1980– | 3p | The first Russian professional Go player among Alexandre Dinerchtein. Affiliate of the Hanguk Kiwon. |
| (Hungary) | Diana Koszegi | 1983– | 1p | The first Hungarian professional Go player. Affiliate of the Hanguk Kiwon. |
| (Ukraine) | Mariya Zakharchenko | 1995– | 1p | the first professional player of Ukraine. |
| (Slovakia) | Lisy Pavol | 1995– | 2p | European Go Federation Professional Player, European Champion, 5 times Slovak Go Champion. |
| (Israel) | Ali Jabarin | 1993– | 2p | European Go Federation Professional Player, 2016 European Go Grand-Slam Champion, 2018 European Grand-Prix Champion. |
| (Poland) | Mateusz Surma | 1995– | 3p | European Go Federation Professional Player, 2 times European Professional Go Champion, 2 times European Go Grand-Slam Champion, Author of 9 Go books, Founder/CEO of polgote.com. |
| (Russia) | Ilya Shikshin | 1990– | 4p | European Go Federation Professional Player, Two times European Go Champion, 2 times Under 12 European Youth Champion, 2 times Under 18 European Youth Champion. |
| (Ukraine) | Artem Kachanovskyi | 1992– | 2p | European Go Federation Professional Player. |
| (Ukraine) | Andrii Kravets | 1990– | 1p | European Go Federation Professional Player. European U12 Champion (2002), 2 times Ukrainian Champion (2012, 2015), European Champion (2023). |
| (Finland) | Antti Törmänen | 1989– | 1p | Antti Törmänen is a Finnish 1p with Nihon Kiin. He was an insei at the Nihon Ki-in, Tokyo from October 2011 to May 2012 and again from April 2014. He finished the Winter 2015 pro exam with over 50% win rate, which qualified him for Foreign National Pro slot |
| (France) | Tanguy Le Calvé | 1995– | 1p | European Go Federation Professional Player. |

== See also ==
- Go professional
- List of world Go champions
- European Go players
- Female Go players
- International Go Federation
- List of Go organizations
- List of professional Go tournaments
