= Kato Masao =

Japanese Go player

Personal information
- Native name: 加藤正夫 (Japanese)
- Nickname: The Killer
- Born: March 15, 1947 Asakura, Fukuoka, Japan
- Died: December 30, 2004 (aged 57)

Sport
- Teacher: Minoru Kitani
- Pupil: Yukari Yoshihara
- Rank: 9 dan

Kato Masao Honorary Oza (加藤 正夫, Katō Masao, March 15, 1947 – December 30, 2004), also known as Kato Kensei (加藤剱正 Katō Kensei), was a Japanese professional go player. A late bloomer, Kato won 46 titles, including the Oza eight times in a row. He also became the second player to reach 1,200 career wins, behind Rin Kaiho.

Kato is the author of The Chinese Opening: The Sure-Win Strategy (published in English by Kiseido Publishing Company) and Kato's Attack and Kill (published by Ishi Press).

== Biography ==
=== Early life and "Killer Kato" (1959–2003) ===
Kato joined Kitani Minoru's go dojo in 1959, quickly becoming friends with Ishida Yoshio. The two became sparring partners and kept a close relationship up until Kato's death. In 1964, Kato passed the pro exam at age seventeen. Along with Takemiya Masaki and Ishida, the trio became known as the three crows of the Kitani dojo. Kato began qualifying for tournaments early on in his professional career. He made the Honinbo league in 1968 as a 4 dan, a feat unheard of at the time. Kato was unable to progress past the group stages and was relegated. However, he challenged title holder Rin Kaiho the following year, losing four games to two.

He was known as the "Killer" for his attacking style. During a Honinbo league match in 1970, Kato forced 22nd Honinbo Takagawa Kaku to resign after 93 moves. For the early part of his career, Kato was known as the eternal runner-up. He finished runner-up eight times before winning his first titles, the Gosei and Judan, in 1976. Kato went on to win 46 total titles, fourth most in Japan behind Cho Chikun, Sakata Eio and Kobayashi Koichi. At one point, Kato held four of the top 7 titles: Meijin, Oza, Judan and Gosei.

=== Later life and death ===
Kato was elected president of the Nihon Ki-in and International Go Federation in early 2004. Under his lead, he eliminated the Oteai, instead introducing new rules to help deal with rank inflation that had occurred over the years. He also increased komi from 5.5 points to 6.5 points and shortened thinking time. Later in the year, Kato fell ill and was hospitalized. He underwent a successful operation on 10 December, but his condition worsened a few weeks later. Kato died on 30 December 2004.

== Promotion record ==
Rank	Year	Notes
1 dan	1964	
2 dan	1964	
3 dan	1965	
4 dan	1966	
5 dan	1967	
6 dan	1969	
7 dan	1971	
8 dan	1973	
9 dan	1978	

== Titles and runners-up ==
Ranks #5 in total number of titles in Japan.

Domestic
Title	Wins	Runners-up
Kisei		4 (1978, 1988, 1991, 1993)
Meijin	2 (1986, 1987)	2 (1981, 1988)
Honinbo	4 (1977–1979, 2002)	5 (1969, 1980, 1995, 1997, 2003)
Tengen	4 (1978–1981)	2 (1982, 1991)
Oza	11 (1979, 1980, 1982–1989, 1993)	3 (1981, 1990, 1994)
Judan	7 (1976–1979, 1983, 1987, 1997)	4 (1980, 1984, 1988, 1998)
Gosei	3 (1976, 1977, 1987)	4 (1978, 1981, 1984, 1988)
Agon Cup	3 (1995, 1996, 2003)	1 (1997)
Ryusei	2 (1998, 2001)	
NHK Cup	1 (1988)	3 (1974, 1993, 1994)
NEC Cup	3 (1990, 1991, 1996)	3 (1992, 1999, 2000)
Nihon Ki-in Championship		1 (1974)
Kakusei	4 (1980, 1986, 1995, 1996)	4 (1993, 1997–1999)
Hayago Championship	2 (1988, 1994)	5 (1980, 1984, 1989, 1998, 1999)
Asahi Pro Best Ten		2 (1970, 1975)
Shin-Ei		1 (1975)
Prime Minister Cup		1 (1973)
Dai-ichi		1 (1971)
Total	46	46
Continental
China-Japan Agon Cup		1 (2003)
Total	0	1

== Bibliography ==
- Kato's Attack and Kill ISBN 978-4-87187-027-6
- The Chinese Opening ISBN 4-906574-33-5

Preceded by Matsuo Toshimitsu	President of the International Go Federation; 2004–2005	Succeeded by Norio Kudo
