= Ahan Tongshan Cup =

Chinese Go competition

- Full name: Ahan Tongshan Cup
- Chinese: 阿含桐山杯
- Pinyin: Āhán Tóngshān Bēi
- Started: 1999
- Sponsors: Agon Shu
- Prize money: 200,000 RMB
- Affiliation: Zhongguo Qiyuan

The Ahan Tongshan Cup (Chinese: 阿含桐山杯; pinyin: Āhán Tóngshān Bēi) is a Chinese Go competition.

== Outline ==
The Ahan Tongshan Cup is a Go tournament played with fast time controls: Each player has 30 seconds per move, along with 10 one-minute periods of extra thinking time. The format is single elimination. As of 2025, the winner receives 200,000 RMB in prize money.

The Ahan Tongshan Cup is the Chinese counterpart of the Agon Kiriyama Cup in Japan. Both tournaments are sponsored by Agon Shu. The winners of the two tournaments play against each other in the China-Japan Agon Cup.

== Past winners and runners-up ==
Edition	Year	Winner	Score	Runner-up
1st	1999	Ma Xiaochun	1–0	Zhou Heyang
2nd	2000	Zhou Heyang	1–0	Shao Weigang
3rd	2001	Liu Jing	1–0	Ma Xiaochun
4th	2002	Yu Bin	1–0	Huang Yizhong
5th	2003	Gu Li	1–0	Kong Jie
6th	2004	Zhou Heyang	1–0	Shao Weigang
7th	2005	Gu Li	1–0	Qiu Jun
8th	2006	Liu Xing	1–0	Luo Xihe
9th	2007	Liu Xing	1–0	Kong Jie
10th	2008	Gu Li	1–0	Chang Hao
11th	2009	Sun Tengyu	1–0	Piao Wenyao
12th	2010	Qiu Jun	1–0	Chang Hao
13th	2011	Piao Wenyao	1–0	Chen Yaoye
14th	2012	Gu Li	1–0	Zhou Ruiyang
15th	2013	Lian Xiao	1–0	Fan Tingyu
16th	2014	Ke Jie	1–0	Tang Weixing
17th	2015	Huang Yunsong	1–0	Chen Yaoye
18th	2016	Ke Jie	1–0	Chen Yaoye
19th	2017	Tuo Jiaxi	1–0	Ke Jie
20th	2018	Gu Zihao	1–0	Fan Tingyu
21st	2019	Fan Tingyu	1–0	Tuo Jiaxi
22nd	2021	Gu Zihao	1–0	Huang Yunsong
23rd	2022	Li Qincheng	1–0	Xie Erhao
24th	2023	Yang Dingxin	1–0	Gu Zihao
25th	2024	Chen Zijian	1–0	Rong Yi
26th	2025	Wang Xinghao	1–0	Dang Yifei

== See also ==
- List of professional Go tournaments
