= Michael Redmond (Go player) =

American Go player (born 1963)

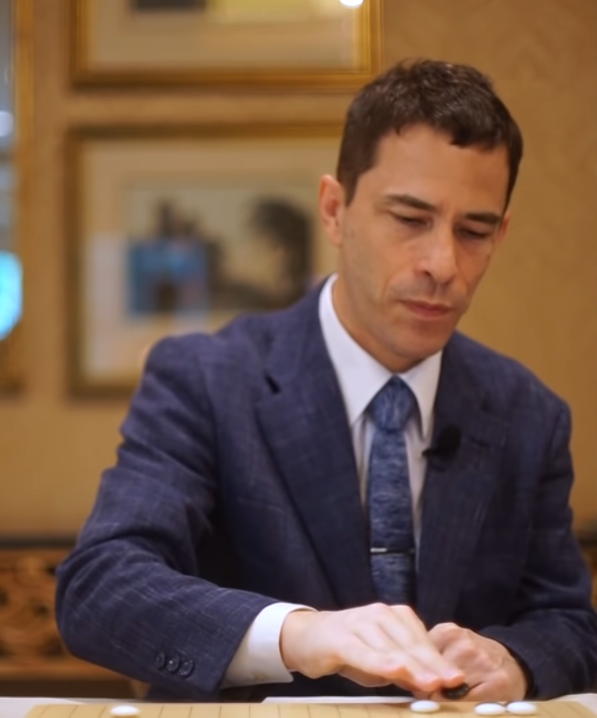
- Redmond in 2018

Personal information
- Native name: マイケル レドモンド (Japanese)
- Full name: Michael Sean Redmond
- Born: May 25, 1963 (age 63) Santa Barbara, California, U.S.

Sport
- Turned pro: 1981
- Teacher: Yusuke Oeda
- Rank: 9 dan
- Affiliation: Nihon Ki-in

Michael Sean Redmond (マイケル・レドモンド, born May 25, 1963) is an American professional Go player. He is one of only a few such players, as Go is not as widespread or developed outside of China, South Korea and Japan. He is the only Westerner to reach the highest grade of 9-dan.

== Biography ==
Michael Redmond was born in 1963 in Santa Barbara, California, and began playing Go at age 11. At 14, he moved to Japan and became an insei (Go apprentice) at the Nihon Ki-in, one of the two major Japanese Go associations. He was promoted to professional 1 dan at age 18, and 2 dan the same year. He was promoted to 5 dan in 1985; 8 dan in 1996; and 9 dan in 2000, becoming the first Western Go professional to reach 9 dan.

Redmond has not won any tournament titles but has come close. He was runner-up in the Shinjin-O, Kisei 7 dan section, and NEC Shun-Ei competitions in the early 1990s. He was also a quarter-finalist in the Fujitsu Cup and Tong Yang Cup. Currently, In 2005, he was voted "Best Commentator" for the NHK channel, over Ishida Yoshio.

In August 2006, he taught at the AGA East Coast Go Camp in Pennsylvania, and attended the 22nd annual US Go Congress in Black Mountain, North Carolina. He has also attended several other US Go Congresses.

Redmond is married to Xian-Xian Niu, a Chinese 5 dan professional. They have two daughters, Yumi and Emi. Redmond and his family are sponsors of many Go activities for children in America, such as the Redmond Cup, an annual tournament for strong youth players. Niu's elder sister, Lili Niu, is a Chinese 5 dan professional and collaborator of Wu Qing-Yuan (Go Seigen). Her husband is Xiangqi (Chinese chess) champion Zhao Guo-rong.

Redmond provided the English commentary along with Chris Garlock for the Google DeepMind Challenge Match between Lee Sedol and AlphaGo from March 9 to March 15, 2016. His commentary was praised in news articles as "vivid" and "illuminating".

== Promotion record ==
Rank	Year	Notes
1 dan	1981	
2 dan	1981	
3 dan	1983	
4 dan	1984	
5 dan	1985	
6 dan	1988	
7 dan	1990	
8 dan	1996	
9 dan	2000	

== Titles and runners-up ==
As of 1 July 2018

Domestic
Title	Wins	Runners-up
Ryuen Cup	1 (1985)	
NEC Shun-Ei		1 (1990)
Shinjin-O		1 (1992)
Career Total
Total	1	2

== Bibliography ==
- Redmond, Michael (2002). The ABC's of Attack and Defense. Slate and Shell. ISBN 978-1932001006.
- Redmond, Michael (2011). Patterns of the Sanrensei. Slate and Shell. ISBN 978-1-932001-63-1.
