= Hon'inbō Satsugen =

Japanese Go player

Personal information
- Native name: 本因坊察元 (Japanese)
- Full name: Hon'inbō Satsugen
- Born: 1733 Japan
- Died: 1788 (aged 54–55) Japan

Sport

Hon'inbō Satsugen (本因坊察元; 1733–1788) was a professional Go player.

== Biography ==
Satsugen became Meijin by defeating Inoue Shunseki in 1767.

Preceded by Hon'inbō Dōchi	Meijin; 1767–1788	Succeeded by Hon'inbō Jōwa
Preceded by Hon'inbō Hakugen	Hon'inbō; 1754–1788	Succeeded by Hon'inbō Retsugen
