= Tengen (Go) =

Go competition in Japan

- Full name: Tengen
- Started: 1975
- Honorary Winners: Rin Kaiho; Iyama Yuta
- Sponsors: Three Newspaper Companies
- Prize money: 12 million yen
- Affiliation: Nihon Ki-in

Tengen (天元, center or origin of heaven) is a Go competition in Japan.

The name Tengen refers to the center point on a Go board.

The event is held annually, and has run continuously since its inauguration in 1975.

== Tengen competition (天元戦) ==
The Tengen competition is a Go tournament run by the Japanese Nihon-Kiin and Kansai-Kiin. The Tengen is the 5th of the 7 big titles in Japanese Go.

It has the same format as the other tournaments. There is a preliminary tournament, which is single knockout, where the winner faces the holder in a best-of-five match.

Before the 6th Tengen, the format was different. Instead of the title holder waiting for a challenger, it would be the two Go players left from the single knockout tournament who then played a best-of-five match to determine the holder.

The tournament was formed from a merger between the Nihon Ki-in and Kansai Ki-in championships. The former ran from 1954 to 1975.

== Past winners ==
	Year	Winner	Score	Runner-up
1	1975	Fujisawa Hideyuki	3–1	Ohira Shuzo
2	1976	Kobayashi Koichi	3–1	Sugiuchi Masao
3	1977	Shimamura Toshiohiro	3–1	Sonoda Yuichi
4	1978	Kato Masao	3–1	Fujisawa Hideyuki
5	1979	Kato Masao	3–0	Kataoka Satoshi
6	1980	Kato Masao	3–0	Yamabe Toshiro
7	1981	Kato Masao	3–2	Kobayashi Koichi
8	1982	Kataoka Satoshi	3–2	Kato Masao
9	1983	Kataoka Satoshi	3–1	Awaji Shuzo
10	1984	Ishida Yoshio	3–1	Kataoka Satoshi
11	1985	Kobayashi Koichi	3–0	Ishida Yoshio
12	1986	Kobayashi Koichi	3–1	Sonoda Yuichi
13	1987	Cho Chikun	3–2	Kobayashi Koichi
14	1988	Cho Chikun	3–2	Sonoda Yuichi
15	1989	Rin Kaiho	3–2	Cho Chikun
16	1990	Rin Kaiho	3–1	Kobayashi Koichi
17	1991	Rin Kaiho	3–1	Kato Masao
18	1992	Rin Kaiho	3–1	Yamashiro Hiroshi
19	1993	Rin Kaiho	3–1	Kataoka Satoshi
20	1994	Ryu Shikun	3–1	Rin Kaiho
21	1995	Ryu Shikun	3–2	Kobayashi Koichi
22	1996	Ryu Shikun	3–2	Rin Kaiho
23	1997	Kudo Norio	3–1	Ryu Shikun
24	1998	Kobayashi Koichi	3–2	Kudo Norio
25	1999	Kobayashi Koichi	3–0	Kudo Norio
26	2000	Ryu Shikun	3–0	Kobayashi Koichi
27	2001	Hane Naoki	3–1	Ryu Shikun
28	2002	Hane Naoki	3–0	Cho Sonjin
29	2003	Hane Naoki	3–2	Yamashita Keigo
30	2004	Yamashita Keigo	3–0	Hane Naoki
31	2005	Kono Rin	3–2	Yamashita Keigo
32	2006	Kono Rin	3–1	Yamashita Keigo
33	2007	Kono Rin	3–1	Yamashita Keigo
34	2008	Cho U	3–0	Kono Rin
35	2009	Yamashita Keigo	3–2	Cho U
36	2010	Yuki Satoshi	3–0	Yamashita Keigo
37	2011	Iyama Yuta	3–0	Yuki Satoshi
38	2012	Iyama Yuta	3–0	Kono Rin
39	2013	Iyama Yuta	3–0	Akiyama Jiro
40	2014	Takao Shinji	3–2	Iyama Yuta
41	2015	Iyama Yuta	3–0	Takao Shinji
42	2016	Iyama Yuta	3–1	Ichiriki Ryo
43	2017	Iyama Yuta	3–0	Ichiriki Ryo
44	2018	Iyama Yuta	3–2	Yamashita Keigo
45	2019	Iyama Yuta	3–2	Kyo Kagen
46	2020	Ichiriki Ryo	3–2	Iyama Yuta
47	2021	Seki Kotaro	3–1	Ichiriki Ryo
48	2022	Seki Kotaro	3–2	Ida Atsushi
49	2023	Ichiriki Ryo	3–1	Seki Kotaro
50	2024	Ichiriki Ryo	3–1	Shibano Toramaru
51	2025	Ichiriki Ryo	3–0	Shida Tatsuya

== Trivia ==
- The first player to defend the title was Kato Masao who won four consecutive terms in the 4th-7th Tengen.
- Rin Kaiho surpassed this with a record five consecutive wins in the 15th-19th Tengen.
- Iyama Yuta equaled this record in the 41st-45th terms, and has won the title a record eight times over nine terms starting with the 37th.

== See also ==
- Honorary Tengen
- Go professional
- China–Japan Tengen
- China–Korea Tengen
- International Go Federation
