= Rin Kaiho =

Taiwanese Go player

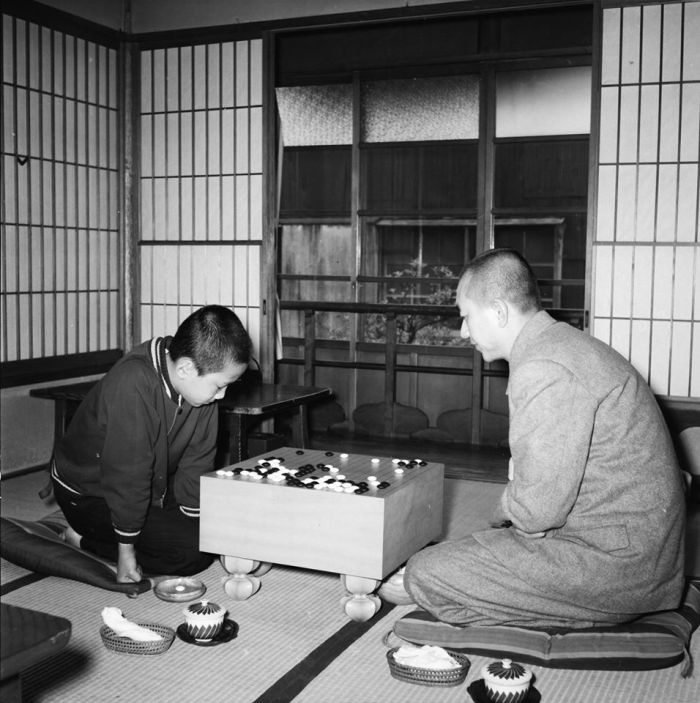
- Go Seigen teaching to a young Rin Kaiho.

Personal information
- Native name: 林海峰 (Chinese); Lín Hǎifēng (Pinyin)
- Full name: Rin Kaiho
- Born: May 6, 1942 (age 84) Shanghai, China

Sport
- Teacher: Go Seigen, Goro Fujita
- Pupil: Cho U
- Rank: 9 dan
- Affiliation: Nihon Ki-in; Tokyo branch

Rin Kaihō or Lin Haifeng (Chinese: 林海峰; pinyin: Lín Hǎifēng; born May 6, 1942) is a professional Taiwanese Go player who made his name in Japan. He is, along with Cho Chikun, Kobayashi Koichi, Otake Hideo, Takemiya Masaki and Kato Masao, considered one of the 'Six Supers' who dominated the Japanese Go world in the last three decades of the twentieth century.

== Biography ==
Rin Kaiho was born in Shanghai, China and moved to Taiwan after the second world war. He learned go from his older brother, and later was a student of Go Seigen when Go brought him to Japan in 1952. He was a promising player who won his first title at the age of 23, the Meijin. He is also part of the 1200 win group. Rin's rise to fame came in 1965 when he challenged Sakata Eio for his Meijin title. Rin, at the time, was still only 23 and critics thought he would stand no chance against the then powerful Sakata. Even Sakata himself said that no Go player under the age of thirty should be Meijin. However, Rin put up a great fight and won the Meijin title. Rin would continue winning the Meijin on different occasions, along with the Honinbo, during the late 1960s and early 1970s. His number of titles currently is 34, ranking him 7th of all time on the total number of titles list, tied with Norimoto Yoda. Rin has been on a dry spell of titles lately, with the last time he even challenged for one being in 2001, for the Meijin. Rin became the first professional in Nihon Ki-in history to reach 1,300 career wins. He won the game against Nobuaki Anzai on October 19, 2006 in a preliminary match for the 32nd Kisei. Rin currently resides in Tokyo, Japan, but remains a citizen of Taiwan.

== Promotion record ==
Rank	Year	Notes
1 dan	1955	
2 dan	1955	
3 dan	1957	
4 dan	1958	
5 dan	1959	
6 dan	1960	
7 dan	1962	
8 dan	1965	
9 dan	1967	

== Titles and runners-up ==
Ranks #8-t in total number of titles in Japan.

Domestic
Title	Wins	Runners-up
Kisei		3 (1980, 1982, 1984)
Meijin	8 (1965–1967, 1969, 1971–1973, 1977)	8 (1968, 1970, 1974, 1978, 1987, 1991, 1994, 2001)
Honinbo	5 (1968–1970, 1983-1984)	6 (1967, 1971-1972, 1974, 1979, 1985)
Tengen	5 (1989–1993)	2 (1994, 1996)
Oza	1 (1973)	3 (1966, 1974, 1986)
Judan	1 (1975)	3 (1976, 1978, 1989)
Gosei	1 (1994)	2 (1993, 1995)
Ryusei		1 (1994)
NHK Cup	3 (1970, 1974, 1978)	1 (1987)
NEC Cup	1 (1989)	2 (1986, 1995)
Nihon Ki-in Championship		1 (1967)
Kakusei	3 (1979, 1992, 1998)	
Hayago Championship	3 (1975, 1984, 1987)	2 (1990, 1995)
Asashi Pro Best Ten	3 (1966, 1973-1974)	1 (1969)
Total	34	34
Continental
China-Japan Tengen	2 (1990-1991)	3 (1992–1994)
Total	2	3
International
Fujitsu Cup	1 (1990)	2 (1988-1989)
Tong Yang Cup		1 (1992)
Total	1	3
Career total
Total	37	40

== Trivia ==
- Rin is Honorary Tengen.
- He needs to win the Kisei tournament and he will have won all 7 major Japanese titles.
- In 1968 he became the second player to hold the Meijin and Honinbo titles at the same time.
- Starting in 1964, Rin had entered the Meijin League and remained in the league (including being the Meijin title holder) for 35 consecutive years (39 participation in total), which is a historical record for all Go tournaments in Japan.
- In 2007 Lee Changho mentioned to the media that Rin is his most respected professional Go player for his respectable personality.
- His students are Cho U, Rin Kanketsu, and Rin Shien.

== Bibliography ==
- Come Up to Shodan. 2001.
- Dictionary of Basic Fuseki Volume 3: 3-4 Point Openings. 2008.
- Dictionary of Basic Fuseki Vol. 2. 2005.
- Dict. of Basic Fuseki, Vol. 1. 2004.
- Kaiho, Rin; Kudo, Norio; Chikun, Cho; et al. (Kido Classics) (Dec 1, 2010). Amazing Happenings in the Game of Go.
