= Kakusei (Go) =

Go competition in Japan

The Kakusei (鶴聖戦) was a Go competition in Japan. It was held annually from 1979 to 2003, a total of 25 times.

== Past winners ==
Kakusei
Player	Years Held
Rin Kaiho	1979, 1992, 1998
Kato Masao	1980, 1986, 1995, 1996
Otake Hideo	1981, 1983, 1984, 1987, 1988
Cho Chikun	1982, 1985
O Rissei	1989, 1993, 1999, 2000
Kataoka Satoshi	1990
Takemiya Masaki	1991
Kobayashi Koichi	1994, 1997, 2001
Yoda Norimoto	2002
Yuki Satoshi	2003
