= Agon Kiriyama Cup =

Japanese Go competition

- Full name: Agon Kiriyama Cup
- Started: 1994
- Sponsors: Agon Shu
- Prize money: 10,000,000 Yen ($86,000)
- Affiliation: Nihon Ki-in

The Agon Kiriyama Cup (阿含･桐山杯) is a Japanese Go competition.

== Outline ==
The Agon Kiriyama Cup is a Go competition endorsed by the Nihon Kiin. It was started in 1994 by Agon Shu. The name was originally the "Acom Cup" but it changed its sponsor in 1999 and became the Agon Kiriyama Cup. It is a single knockout tournament, but unlike the big titles in Japan, the title holder does not wait for a challenger, hence the difficulty of defending the title. The prize for the winner is 10,000,000 yen, a larger prize than some of the top-seven major titles.

The tournament has a counterpart in China, the Ahan Tongshan Cup; the winners of the two tournaments face off in the China-Japan Agon Cup.

== Past winners ==
Agon Kiriyama Cup
Year	Winner	Runner-up
1994	O Rissei	Cho Chikun
1995	Kato Masao	Kobayashi Satoru
1996	Kato Masao	Yoda Norimoto
1997	Yoda Norimoto	Kato Masao
1998	Kobayashi Satoru	Cho Chikun
1999	Kobayashi Koichi	Takao Shinji
2000	Cho Sonjin	Cho Chikun
2001	Cho Sonjin	O Rissei
2002	Cho Chikun	Cho U
2003	Kato Masao	Cho U
2004	Hane Naoki	Kobayashi Koichi
2005	Iyama Yuta	Kobayashi Satoru
2006	Cho U	Hane Naoki
2007	Cho U	Cho Chikun
2008	Cho U	Takanashi Seiken
2009	Hane Naoki	Cho U
2010	Yamashita Keigo	Cho Chikun
2011	Iyama Yuta	Yamashita Keigo
2012	Cho U	Rin Shien
2013	Murakawa Daisuke	Shida Tatsuya
2014	Iyama Yuta	Kono Rin
2015	Iyama Yuta	Kyo Kagen
2016	Kono Rin	Cho Chikun
2017	Mutsuura Yuta	Takao Shinji
2018	Ichiriki Ryo	Shibano Toramaru
2019	Cho U	Ichiriki Ryo
2020	Iyama Yuta	Yamashita Keigo
2021	Kyo Kagen	Iyama Yuta
2022	Hirata Tomoya	Iyama Yuta
2023	Ichiriki Ryo	Iyama Yuta
2024	Ichiriki Ryo	Shibano Toramaru
2025	Ichiriki Ryo	Shibano Toramaru

== See also ==
- Go competitions
- International Go Federation
- List of professional Go tournaments
