= Liu Xiaoguang =

Chinese Go player

Liu Xiaoguang 刘小光
Personal information
- Full name: Liu Xiaoguang
- Born: 20 March 1960 (age 66) Kaifeng, Henan, China

Sport
- Turned pro: 1982
- Teacher: Huang Jinxian
- Pupil: Hu Yaoyu, Kong Jie
- Rank: 9 dan
- Affiliation: Chinese Weiqi Association

Liu Xiaoguang
- Traditional Chinese: 劉小光
- Simplified Chinese: 刘小光
Transcriptions
Standard Mandarin
- Hanyu Pinyin: Liú Xiǎoguāng

Liu Xiaoguang (Chinese: 刘小光; pinyin: Liú Xiǎoguāng; born 20 March 1960) is a professional Go player.

== Biography ==
He started playing Go at the age of 13 and became a 6 dan professional in 1982. In 1988, he was awarded 9 dan by the Zhongguo Qiyuan. Liu defeated four Japanese professionals in the 3rd China-Japan Supermatches.

== Titles and runners-up ==
As of 1 May 2019

Ranks #8 in total number of titles in China.

Domestic
Title	Wins	Runners-up
National Go Individual	2 (1980, 1990)	1 (1988)
Guoshou	1 (1986)	
Shiqiang		1 (1988)
Mingren	1 (1988)	4 (1989, 1995–1996, 1998)
Tianyuan	4 (1988–1990, 1993)	4 (1991, 1994, 1996, 1999)
CCTV Cup		1 (1990)
Wangwei	1 (1994)	
Youqing Cup	1 (1995)	
Baosheng Cup	1 (1998)	
Nanfang Securities Cup	1 (2000)	
Huashan Cup	1 (2001)	
Total	13	11
Continental
China-Japan Tengen	1 (1993)	3 (1988–1990)
Total	1	3
Career total
Total	14	14
