= Meijin (Go) =

Japanese Go tournament

- Full name: Meijin
- Started: 1976
- Honorary Winners: Cho Chikun; Koichi Kobayashi
- Sponsors: Asahi
- Prize money: 30 million yen
- Affiliation: Nihon Ki-in

Meijin (名人,めいじん) means "Expert or Master". It is the name of the second most prestigious Japanese Go Tournament. It also refers to a traditional Japanese title given to the strongest player of the day during the Edo period.

== The tournament ==
The Meijin tournament is sponsored by the Asahi newspaper, and has prize money of ¥30,000,000 for the winner (since the 45th Meijin in 2020).

The tournament is open to Nihon Ki-in and Kansai Ki-in players. A nine-player league decides the challenger each year. Every year, the three worst-ranked players in the league drop out. Entrance into the league is decided by three preliminaries. The first is between 1 and 4 dan (6 winners: 4 Nihon Ki-in and 2 Kansai Ki-in). The second is between 5-9 dans and the six winners (18 winners). The third is between these 18 and the 3 people dropped from the league (3 winners, who entered the league). Komi is 6.5. The time limit is 8 hours each in the title matches and 3 hours in the league and prelims. Byo-yomi is 1 minute per move.

== History ==
The title of "Meijin" derives from a game played by the first Hon'inbō, Sansa. An onlooker (no less than Japanese warlord Oda Nobunaga) watched him play a particularly brilliant move and exclaimed "Meijin!" in appreciation of its greatness. The term was thereafter applied to the strongest player of the day. Sansa, besides being Nobunaga's Go tutor, also taught Toyotomi Hideyoshi, who, after taking control, established Sansa as Godokoro, roughly meaning "Head of the Government Go Bureau." The Meijin title came to be greatly prized by all of the most promising Go prodigies of the age, freed from the cares of everyday life by the government stipends coming from the Go Bureau. Most often held by members of the Hon'inbō school, it was also held by brilliant Yasuis and Inoues. No player from Hayashi House attained Meijin status. The title "Meijin" is also attached to the rank of 9 dan during this period; hence, there is only one 9-dan/Meijin at a time even if there are many players that are at the strength of a 9 dan. 8-dan players in the Edo period are called Jun-Meijin, which means "half-Meijin," which is a rank accorded to sixteen players in the Edo period. After the Meiji Revolution, the four houses fell into disrepair due to the lack of government stipends.

In 1958, the Yomiuri newspaper decided to sponsor a "Strongest Player" tournament to decide the strongest player of the current time. In 1961 the tournament's name was changed to Meijin.

Since they already sponsored the Shogi Meijin tournament, in 1975 the Asahi newspaper offered to buy the rights to the Meijin tournament from the Yomiuri. After months of debating, the title was sold and the Yomiuri began sponsoring a new title, Kisei (Go Saint). The tournament before 1976 thus became called the Old Meijin.

== Historic Meijins ==
Number	Player	Years
1st	Hon'inbō Sansa	1612–1623
2nd	Inoue Nakamura Doseki	1623–1630
3rd	Yasui Sanchi	1668–1676
4th	Hon'inbō Dōsaku	1677–1702
5th	Inoue Dōsetsu Inseki	1708–1719
6th	Hon'inbō Dōchi	1721–1727
7th	Hon'inbō Satsugen	1767–1788
8th	Hon'inbō Jōwa	1831–1839
9th	Hon'inbō Shūei	1906–1907
10th	Hon'inbō Shūsai	1914–1940

== Past winners ==
Meijin
Edition	Year	Winner	Score	Runner-up
1 (old)	1961–62	Hideyuki Fujisawa	13-player league	
2 (old)	1963	Eio Sakata	4–3	Hideyuki Fujisawa
3 (old)	1964	Eio Sakata	4–1	Hideyuki Fujisawa
4 (old)	1965	Rin Kaiho	4–2	Eio Sakata
5 (old)	1966	Rin Kaiho	4–1	Eio Sakata
6 (old)	1967	Rin Kaiho	4–1	Eio Sakata
7 (old)	1968	Kaku Takagawa	4–1	Rin Kaiho
8 (old)	1969	Rin Kaiho	4–2	Kaku Takagawa
9 (old)	1970	Hideyuki Fujisawa	4–2	Rin Kaiho
10 (old)	1971	Rin Kaiho	4–2	Hideyuki Fujisawa
11 (old)	1972	Rin Kaiho	4–2	Hideyuki Fujisawa
12 (old)	1973	Rin Kaiho	4–3	Yoshio Ishida
13 (old)	1974	Yoshio Ishida	4–3	Rin Kaiho
14 (old)	1975	Hideo Otake	4–3	Ishida Yoshio
1	1976	Hideo Otake	4–1	Ishida Yoshio
2	1977	Rin Kaiho	4–0	Hideo Otake
3	1978	Hideo Otake	4–2	Rin Kaiho
4	1979	Hideo Otake	4–1	Eio Sakata
5	1980	Cho Chikun	4–1–1	Hideo Otake
6	1981	Cho Chikun	4–0	Masao Kato
7	1982	Cho Chikun	4–1	Hideo Otake
8	1983	Cho Chikun	4–1	Hideo Otake
9	1984	Cho Chikun	4–3	Hideo Otake
10	1985	Koichi Kobayashi	4–3	Cho Chikun
11	1986	Masao Kato	4–0	Koichi Kobayashi
12	1987	Masao Kato	4–0	Rin Kaiho
13	1988	Koichi Kobayashi	4–1	Masao Kato
14	1989	Koichi Kobayashi	4–1	Shuzo Awaji
15	1990	Koichi Kobayashi	4–2	Hideo Otake
16	1991	Koichi Kobayashi	4–1	Rin Kaiho
17	1992	Koichi Kobayashi	4–3	Hideo Otake
18	1993	Koichi Kobayashi	4–1	Hideo Otake
19	1994	Koichi Kobayashi	4–0	Rin Kaiho
20	1995	Masaki Takemiya	4–1	Koichi Kobayashi
21	1996	Cho Chikun	4–2	Masaki Takemiya
22	1997	Cho Chikun	4–2	Kobayashi Koichi
23	1998	Cho Chikun	4–2–1	Ō Rissei
24	1999	Cho Chikun	4–1	Norimoto Yoda
25	2000	Norimoto Yoda	4–0	Cho Chikun
26	2001	Norimoto Yoda	4–2	Rin Kaiho
27	2002	Norimoto Yoda	4–1	Cho Chikun
28	2003	Norimoto Yoda	4–1	Keigo Yamashita
29	2004	Cho U	4–2	Norimoto Yoda
30	2005	Cho U	4–3	Satoru Kobayashi
31	2006	Shinji Takao	4–2	Cho U
32	2007	Cho U	4–3	Shinji Takao
33	2008	Cho U	4–3	Yuta Iyama
34	2009	Yuta Iyama	4–1	Cho U
35	2010	Yuta Iyama	4–0	Shinji Takao
36	2011	Keigo Yamashita	4–2	Yuta Iyama
37	2012	Keigo Yamashita	4–3	Naoki Hane
38	2013	Yuta Iyama	4–1	Keigo Yamashita
39	2014	Yuta Iyama	4–2	Rin Kono
40	2015	Yuta Iyama	4–0	Shinji Takao
41	2016	Shinji Takao	4–3	Yuta Iyama
42	2017	Yuta Iyama	4–1	Shinji Takao
43	2018	Cho U	4–3	Yuta Iyama
44	2019	Toramaru Shibano	4–1	Cho U
45	2020	Yuta Iyama	4–1	Toramaru Shibano
46	2021	Yuta Iyama	4–3	Ryo Ichiriki
47	2022	Toramaru Shibano	4–3	Yuta Iyama
48	2023	Toramaru Shibano	4–2	Yuta Iyama
49	2024	Ryo Ichiriki	4–2	Toramaru Shibano
50	2025	Ryo Ichiriki	4–2	Toramaru Shibano

== In fiction ==
In the manga Hikaru no Go, there is a Meijin called Toya Koyo.

== See also ==
- International Go Federation
- List of professional Go tournaments
- Honorary Meijin
- Yasunari Kawabata, author of The Master of Go
