= Rin Kono =

Japanese professional Go player (born 1981)

Personal information
- Native name: 河野臨 (Japanese)
- Full name: Rin Kono
- Born: January 7, 1981 (age 45) Tokyo, Japan

Sport
- Turned pro: 1996
- Teacher: Koichi Kobayashi
- Rank: 9 dan
- Affiliation: Nihon Ki-in

Rin Kono (河野臨, Kōno Rin; born January 7, 1981) is a Japanese professional Go player.

== Biography ==
Rin Kono grew up as one of Koichi Kobayashi's students. He became a professional when he was 15 in 1996. He was promoted to 8 dan after beating Keigo Yamashita to win the Tengen in 2005. He was promoted to 9 dan after defending his Tengen title, once more against Yamashita.

== Promotion Record ==
Rank	Year	Notes
1 dan	1996	Promoted to professional dan rank after passing qualifying test.
2 dan	1996	
3 dan		
4 dan		
5 dan	1999	
6 dan	2001	
7 dan		
8 dan	2005	Won Tengen title against Keigo Yamashita.
9 dan	2006	Defended Tengen title against Keigo Yamashita.

== Titles and runners-up ==
Domestic
Title	Wins	Runners-up
Meijin		1 (2014)
Tengen	3 (2005–2007)	1 (2008)
Agon Cup	1 (2016)	1 (2014)
Ryusei	1 (2008)	1 (2013)
NEC Cup	2 (2008, 2010)	
Total	6	4
