= Kisei (Go) =

Honorary title in the Go competitive scene

- Full name: Kisei
- Started: 1976
- Honorary Winners: Fujisawa Hideyuki; Kobayashi Koichi; Iyama Yuta
- Sponsors: Yomiuri Shimbun
- Prize money: ¥43 million
- Affiliation: Nihon Ki-in

Kisei (棋聖) is an honorary title and Go tournament. The title, meaning Go Sage in Japanese, was a traditional honorary appellation given to a handful of players down the centuries. The element ki can also apply to shogi, and there were also recognized kisei in the shogi world.

== Background ==
Kisei is a Go competition organised by the Japanese Nihon Ki-in. The competition began in 1976 by the Yomiuri Shimbun newspaper and is the highest paying competition in Japanese professional Go, paying ¥43,000,000 to the winner since the 47th Kisei in 2023. The word Kisei is Japanese for "Go Sage", which is why before the Kisei tournament began, the only players who were given the title "Kisei" were Kanren, Dōsaku, Hon'inbo Jowa, and Hon′inbō Shūsaku.

The holder is challenged by whoever wins the round robin league. Players can get into the round robin league by going through many preliminary tournaments. Once there is a challenger to compete against the holder, the winner is decided through a best of seven match. The games are played over two days and each player is given eight hours of thinking time. If a player qualifies for the Kisei league, they are automatically promoted to 7 dan. If that same player wins the league, a promotion to 8 dan is given. If that same player goes on to winning the title, they are promoted to 9 dan, the highest rank.

== Competitions ==
=== 1st Kisei ===
The 1st Kisei was the birth of the new Go tournament. Since this was the first year of the tournament, there was no set challenger or holder. From the 2nd edition on, there has been a playoff between challengers. At the time, it was the highest paying tournament there had ever been, and would be until the creation of the Ing Cup. Fujisawa Hideyuki's win would mark the beginning of a six-year defense of the Kisei title from 1977 to 1982.

=== 2nd Kisei ===
The 2nd Kisei was the 2nd edition of the Kisei tournament. Since Fujisawa Hideyuki won the previous year, he was given an automatic place in the final. Eight players battled in a knockout tournament to decide the final 2. Those two would then play each other in a best-of-3 match to decide who would face Fujisawa. Kato Masao became the challenger after beating Rin Kaiho 2 games to 1, but would lose 4 games to 3 against Fujisawa.

=== 3rd Kisei ===
The 3rd Kisei was the 3rd edition of the Kisei tournament. Since Fujisawa Hideyuki won the previous year, he was given an automatic place in the final. Eight players battled in a knockout tournament to decide the final 2. Those two would then play each other in a best-of-3 match to decide who would face Fujisawa. Ishida Yoshio became the challenger after beating Sakata Eio 2 games to 1, but would lose 4 games to 1 against Fujisawa.

=== 4th Kisei ===
The 4th Kisei was the 4th edition of the Kisei tournament. Since Fujisawa Hideyuki won the previous year, he is given an automatic place in the final. Eight players battled in a knockout tournament to decide the final 2. Those two would then play each other in a best-of-3 match to decide who would face Fujisawa. Rin Kaiho became the challenger after beating Hashimoto Shoji 2 games to 1, but would lose 4 games to 1 against Fujisawa.

=== 5th Kisei ===
The 5th Kisei was the 5th edition of the Kisei tournament. Since Fujisawa Hideyuki won the previous year, he is given an automatic place in the final. Eight players battled in a knockout tournament to decide the final 2. Those two would then play each other in a best-of-3 match to decide who would face Fujisawa. Otake Hideo became the challenger after beating Cho Chikun 2 games to 1, but would lose 4 games to 0 against Fujisawa.

=== 6th Kisei ===
The 6th Kisei was the 6th edition of the Kisei tournament. Since Fujisawa Hideyuki won the previous year, he was given an automatic place in the final. Eight players battled in a knockout tournament to decide the final 2. Those two would then play each other in a best-of-3 match to decide who would face Fujisawa. Rin Kaiho became the challenger after beating Kobayashi Koichi 2 games to 0, but would lose 4 games to 3 against Fujisawa.

=== 7th Kisei ===
The 7th Kisei was the seventh edition of the Kisei Go tournament, played in 1983. Since Fujisawa Hideyuki won the previous year, he is given an automatic place in the final. Eight players battled in a knockout tournament to decide the final 2. Those two would then play each other in a best-of-3 match to decide who would face Fujisawa. Cho Chikun became the challenger after beating Kato Masao 2 games to 0 and went on to beat Fujisawa 4 games to 3 to become the new Kisei.

=== 8th Kisei ===
The 8th Kisei was the 8th edition of the Kisei tournament. Since Cho Chikun won the previous year, he is given an automatic place in the final. Eight players battled in a knockout tournament to decide the final 2. Those two would then play each other in a best-of-3 match to decide who would face Cho. Rin Kaiho became the challenger after beating Sonoda Yuichi 2 games to 0, but lost to Cho 4 games to 2.

=== 9th Kisei ===
The 9th Kisei was the 9th edition of the Kisei tournament, held in 1985. Since Cho Chikun won the previous year, he was given an automatic place in the final. Eight players battled in a knockout tournament to decide the final 2. Those two would then play each other in a best-of-3 match to decide who would face Cho. Takemiya Masaki became the challenger after beating Kobayashi Koichi 2 games to 1, but lost to Cho 4 games to 3.

=== 10th Kisei ===
The 10th Kisei was the 10th edition of the Kisei tournament. Since Cho Chikun won the previous year, he is given an automatic place in the final. Twelve players battled in a knockout tournament to decide the final 2. Those two would then play each other in a best-of-3 match to decide who would face Cho. Koichi Kobayashi became the challenger after beating Masao Kato 2 games to 1, and went on to defeat Cho Chikun 4 games to 2.

=== 11th Kisei ===
The 11th Kisei was the 11th edition of the Kisei tournament. Since Koichi Kobayashi won the previous year, he is given an automatic place in the final. Eleven players battled in a knockout tournament to decide the final 2. Those two would then play each other in a best-of-3 match to decide who would face Kobayashi. Masaki Takemiya became the challenger after beating Hideo Otake 2 games to 1, but he would lose to Kobayashi 4 games to 1 in the final.

=== 12th Kisei ===
The 12th Kisei was the 12th edition of the Kisei tournament for the game of Go. Since Koichi Kobayashi won the previous year, he was given an automatic place in the final. Eleven players battled in a knockout tournament to decide the final two. Those two would then play each other in a best-of-3 match to decide who would face Kobayashi. Masao Kato became the challenger after beating Hideo Otake 2 games to 0, but would lose to Kobayashi 4 games to 1 in the final.

=== 13th Kisei ===
The 13th Kisei took place in 1989. Koichi Kobayashi won the title 4 games to 1 over Masaki Takemiya.

=== 14th Kisei ===
The 14th Kisei took place in 1990. Koichi Kobayashi won the title 4 games to 1 over Hideo Otake.

=== 19th Kisei ===
The 19th Kisei was the 19th edition of the Kisei tournament, in 1995. Since Cho Chikun won the previous year, he was given an automatic place in the final to defend his title. Sixteen players battled in a single elimination tournament to decide the final 2. Those two would then play each other in a best-of-7 match to decide who would face Cho. Kobayashi Satoru became the challenger after beating Kobayashi Koichi, but lost 4 games to 2 against Cho.

=== 20th Kisei ===
The 20th Kisei 20th iteration of the Kisei tournament. It was won by Cho Chikun and held in 1996. The first match was played outside Japan, in Amsterdam, Netherlands. Chikun won 4 games to 3 over Kobayashi Satoru in the final.

=== 25th Kisei ===
Kisei is a Go competition used by the Japanese Nihon-Kiin. The 2001 Kisei was the first edition that used the group system. Preliminary tournaments were held to find the twelve players to split into two groups. The players with the most wins advance to the challenger final. If there are two players tied with the same number of wins, they go through a playoff, usually consisting of one game. If there were three, the player holding the highest ranked title would have a bye, and the other two would have a playoff. Whichever of the two wins, would face the player with the bye. Whoever wins that match, advances to the challenger final.

== Past winners ==
| No. | Year | Winner | Score | Runner-up |
|---|---|---|---|---|
| 1 | 1977 | Fujisawa Hideyuki | 4–1 | Hashimoto Utaro |
| 2 | 1978 | Fujisawa Hideyuki | 4–3 | Kato Masao |
| 3 | 1979 | Fujisawa Hideyuki | 4–1 | Ishida Yoshio |
| 4 | 1980 | Fujisawa Hideyuki | 4–1 | Rin Kaiho |
| 5 | 1981 | Fujisawa Hideyuki | 4–0 | Otake Hideo |
| 6 | 1982 | Fujisawa Hideyuki | 4–3 | Rin Kaiho |
| 7 | 1983 | Cho Chikun | 4–3 | Fujisawa Hideyuki |
| 8 | 1984 | Cho Chikun | 4–2 | Rin Kaiho |
| 9 | 1985 | Cho Chikun | 4–3 | Takemiya Masaki |
| 10 | 1986 | Kobayashi Koichi | 4–2 | Cho Chikun |
| 11 | 1987 | Kobayashi Koichi | 4–1 | Takemiya Masaki |
| 12 | 1988 | Kobayashi Koichi | 4–1 | Kato Masao |
| 13 | 1989 | Kobayashi Koichi | 4–1 | Takemiya Masaki |
| 14 | 1990 | Kobayashi Koichi | 4–1 | Otake Hideo |
| 15 | 1991 | Kobayashi Koichi | 4–3 | Kato Masao |
| 16 | 1992 | Kobayashi Koichi | 4–3 | Yamashiro Hiroshi |
| 17 | 1993 | Kobayashi Koichi | 4–3 | Kato Masao |
| 18 | 1994 | Cho Chikun | 4–2 | Kobayashi Koichi |
| 19 | 1995 | Kobayashi Satoru | 4–2 | Cho Chikun |
| 20 | 1996 | Cho Chikun | 4–3 | Kobayashi Satoru |
| 21 | 1997 | Cho Chikun | 4–1 | Kobayashi Satoru |
| 22 | 1998 | Cho Chikun | 4–2 | Yoda Norimoto |
| 23 | 1999 | Cho Chikun | 4–2 | Kobayashi Koichi |
| 24 | 2000 | O Rissei | 4–2 | Cho Chikun |
| 25 | 2001 | O Rissei | 4–2 | Cho Sonjin |
| 26 | 2002 | O Rissei | 4–2 | Ryu Shikun |
| 27 | 2003 | Yamashita Keigo | 4–1 | O Rissei |
| 28 | 2004 | Hane Naoki | 4–3 | Yamashita Keigo |
| 29 | 2005 | Hane Naoki | 4–3 | Yuki Satoshi |
| 30 | 2006 | Yamashita Keigo | 4–0 | Hane Naoki |
| 31 | 2007 | Yamashita Keigo | 4–0 | Kobayashi Satoru |
| 32 | 2008 | Yamashita Keigo | 4–3 | Cho Chikun |
| 33 | 2009 | Yamashita Keigo | 4–2 | Yoda Norimoto |
| 34 | 2010 | Cho U | 4–1 | Yamashita Keigo |
| 35 | 2011 | Cho U | 4–2 | Iyama Yuta |
| 36 | 2012 | Cho U | 4–3 | Takao Shinji |
| 37 | 2013 | Iyama Yuta | 4–2 | Cho U |
| 38 | 2014 | Iyama Yuta | 4–2 | Yamashita Keigo |
| 39 | 2015 | Iyama Yuta | 4–3 | Yamashita Keigo |
| 40 | 2016 | Iyama Yuta | 4–0 | Yamashita Keigo |
| 41 | 2017 | Iyama Yuta | 4–2 | Kono Rin |
| 42 | 2018 | Iyama Yuta | 4–0 | Ichiriki Ryo |
| 43 | 2019 | Iyama Yuta | 4–3 | Yamashita Keigo |
| 44 | 2020 | Iyama Yuta | 4–2 | Kono Rin |
| 45 | 2021 | Iyama Yuta | 4–1 | Kono Rin |
| 46 | 2022 | Ichiriki Ryo | 4–3 | Iyama Yuta |
| 47 | 2023 | Ichiriki Ryo | 4–2 | Shibano Toramaru |
| 48 | 2024 | Ichiriki Ryo | 4–3 | Iyama Yuta |
| 49 | 2025 | Ichiriki Ryo | 4–3 | Iyama Yuta |
| 50 | 2026 | Shibano Toramaru | 4–3 | Ichiriki Ryo |

== Honorary winners ==
A Go player who has held the title for five consecutive years, or won the title a total of ten times or more, has qualified themselves to become "Honorary Kisei" after retiring or after the age of 60.

- Fujisawa Hideyuki 1977–1982
- Kobayashi Koichi 1986–1993
- Iyama Yuta 2013–2021
