= Takemiya Masaki =

Japanese Go player

Masaki Takemiya
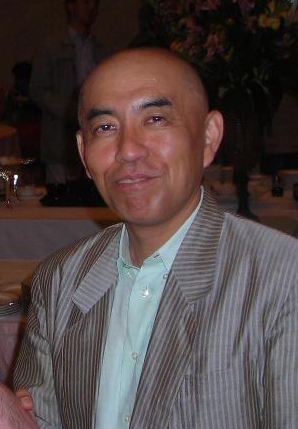

Personal information
- Native name: 武宮正樹 (Japanese)
- Full name: Masaki Takemiya
- Born: January 1, 1951 (age 75) Tokyo, Japan

Sport
- Turned pro: 1965
- Teacher: Minoru Kitani
- Rank: 9 dan
- Affiliation: Nihon Ki-in

Takemiya Masaki (武宮 正樹, Takemiya Masaki; born January 1, 1951) is a professional Go player.

== Biography ==
Takemiya Masaki was born in Japan. He became one of the many disciples of the Minoru Kitani school. His rise to fame began when he was only 15 years old. He earned the nickname "9 dan killer" because he won several games against top rated players.

His famous "cosmic style" of Go would become popular among fans. It focused on large moyo in the center of the board.

In 1987, he lost a 6½ hour game against Nie Weiping during the annual China-Japan Challenge Series, then considered to be the game of the century. He's known as keeping a consistent record of winning titles. The longest period in which he did not hold a title has only been 4 years. He closed off 2005 with an impressive win of 16 straight games, which was stopped by Omori Yasushi in the qualifiers for the 3rd World Oza.

In 2012, the software program Zen, running on a four PC cluster, beat Takemiya twice at five- and four-stone handicaps.

Outside of Go, Takemiya also won the biggest Japanese backgammon tournament, the 12th Saint of the Board title, by beating the former holder, Abe Akiko.

Four of Takemiya's books have been published in English -- Enclosure Joseki (Kiseido Press), now out of print; Imagination of a Go Master (NEMESIS Enterprises), This is Go the Natural Way! (Hinoki Press); and Cosmic Go (Board N' Stones).

== Style ==
Takemiya is known for his "Double 4" fuseki when he uses white, where he usually starts the game like so:

Go board, 19 by 19. Moves: 1 black Q17; 2 white D4; 3 black R4; 4 white D16.1423
"Double 4" fuseki (White).

Takemiya is a favorite among amateur go players because of his very thick playing style as black. His sanrensei (three star) openings involve plenty of fights.

Go board, 19 by 19. Black stones: Q16, Q10, Q4. White stones: D16, D4. Moves: 0 white O3; 1 black M3; 2 white R3; 3 black R4; 4 white Q3; 5 black P4; 6 white O2; 7 black N5; 8 white O17; 9 black P15; 10 white R17; 11 black R16; 12 white Q17; 13 black N16. Marks: triangle on black stone at Q10.081210131109△0705030100040206
Takemiya's famous moyo (right side)

The sequence of moves from 00-07 in the lower right corner involves a common joseki that creates a moyo in conjunction with the triangled stone. Takemiya often plays a variation of this joseki but has made a few innovations of his own such as the kosumi in response to the same corner approach in the upper right corner. The resulting sequence could result in moves 08-13, where 09 is the kosumi move.

=== Takemiya on go and dancing ===
Takemiya draws comparisons between go and dancing, stating that go is more like a dance than a war and that learning to dance has made him a better go player. This has also influenced his style in his later years.

== Titles and runners-up ==
Takemiya is one of the top title holders in Japan.

Domestic
Title	Wins	Runners-up
Kisei		3 (1985, 1987, 1989)
Meijin	1 (1995)	1 (1996)
Honinbo	6 (1976, 1980, 1985–1988)	4 (1974, 1977, 1981, 1989)
Oza		1 (1988)
Judan	3 (1990–1992)	3 (1986, 1993, 2002)
Gosei		1 (1977)
NHK Cup	1 (1989)	5 (1975, 1977, 1984, 1986, 2009)
NEC Cup	2 (1981, 1985)	
Nihon Ki-in Championship		1 (1971)
Kakusei	1 (1991)	
Hayago Championship	2 (1978, 1989)	1 (1988)
Asahi Pro Best Ten		1 (1974)
Prime Minister Cup	2 (1971, 1973)	
Total	18	20
International
Fujitsu Cup	2 (1988, 1989)	
IBM Cup		1 (1988)
Asian TV Cup	4 (1989–1992)	
Total	6	1
Career total
Total	24	21

== Published work ==
- Takemiya, Masaki (July 2004). Imagination of a Go Master. Translated by Terry, Robert J. Nemesis Enterprises.
