= Go ranks and ratings =

Ranks and rating systems used by the game Go

There are various systems of Go ranks and ratings that measure the skill in the traditional board game Go. Traditionally, Go rankings have been measured using a system of dan and kyū ranks. Especially in amateur play, these ranks facilitate the handicapping system, with a difference of one rank roughly corresponding to one free move at the beginning of the game. This system is also commonly used in many East Asian martial arts, where it often corresponds with a belt color. With the ready availability of calculators and computers, Elo-based rating systems have been introduced. In such systems, a rating is rigorously calculated on the basis of game results.

== Kyu and dan ranks ==
Traditionally, the level of players has been defined using kyu and dan ranks. Kyu ranks are considered student ranks. Dan ranks are considered master ranks. Beginners who have just learned the rules of the game are usually around 30th kyu. As they progress, they advance numerically downwards through the kyu grades. The best kyu grade attainable is therefore 1st kyu. If players progress beyond 1st kyu, they will receive the rank of 1st dan, and from then on will move numerically upwards through the dan ranks. 1st dan is the equivalent of a black belt in martial arts. The very best players may achieve a professional dan rank.

The rank system is tabulated from the lowest to highest ranks:

Rank Type	Range	Stage
Double-digit kyu (級,급) (geup in Korean)	30–20k	Beginner
Double-digit kyu (abbreviated: DDK)	19–10k	Casual player
Single-digit kyu (abbreviated: SDK)	9–1k	Intermediate amateur
Amateur dan (段,단)	1–7d	Advanced amateur
Professional dan (段,단)	1–9p	Professional player

(There is also an amateur title of 8-dan and a professional title of 10-dan, but these are not the same as ranks.)

Although almost all organizations use this system, there is no universal calibration. The methods of awarding each of those ranks and the corresponding levels of strength vary from country to country and among online Go servers. This means that a player who is considered to be a 2nd kyu in one country, may only be considered a 5th kyu in another.

Differences in strength up to amateur dan level generally correspond to the level of handicap that would yield an even game between the two players. For instance, it is expected that a 3d player could give 2 handicap stones to a 1d player and win half of their games. In contrast, differences in professional ranks are much smaller, perhaps 1/4 to 1/3 of a handicap stone. There are some significant differences in strength between ordinary 9p players and the best players in the world because 9p is the highest rank possible, which may account for this variation.

=== Origin ===
The first Go ranks were given in 2nd century (CE) China, when Handan Chun (Chinese: 邯郸淳) described the 9 Pin Zhi (九品制) ranking system in his book Classic of Arts (艺经). From the early 17th century, the Japanese formalised the teaching and ranking of Go. The system was later used in martial arts schools; and is thought to be derived originally from court ranks in China. It is thought that the fact that there are 9 professional dan grades finds its base in the original 9 Chinese Pin Zhi grades.

=== Achieving a dan rank ===
Dan (abbreviated online as "d") ranks are for advanced amateur players. Although many organisations let players choose their own kyu rank to a certain extent, dan ranks are often regulated. This means that players will have to show good results in tournaments or pass exams to be awarded a dan rank. Serious students of the game will often strive to attain a dan rank, much as martial arts practitioners will strive to achieve a black belt. For amateurs, dan ranks up to 7th dan are available. Above this level, a player must become a professional player to achieve further promotions. In Japan and China, some players are awarded an amateur 8th dan rank as an honorary title for exceptional achievement. In the United States, amateur dan ranks are often based on the AGA rating system. Under this system, some strong amateurs and former professional players have achieved up to 9th dan amateur, though generally they will register as 6th or 7th dan in international events. Similarly, some players have achieved 9th dan amateur ranks in the rating system of online Go servers.

Although players who have achieved professional dan ranks are nominally stronger than amateur dan players, in practice some of the strongest 7th dan amateur players have a playing level on par with that of some professional players. Such players have either never tried for a professional rank, or have chosen to remain amateur players because they do not want to make a career out of playing Go.

=== Professional ranks ===
The professional dan ranking system is similar to that of amateurs in that it awards dan ranks that increase numerically with skill. The difference between these grades is much smaller than with amateurs however, and is not based on the number of handicap stones required. Professional dan ranks go up to 9th dan, but the strength difference between a 1st dan and a 9th dan professional is generally no more than 2–3 handicap stones.

To distinguish between professional dan and amateur dan ranks, the former is often abbreviated to "p" (sometimes called ping) and the latter to "d". There was no such abbreviation in the past, and this is not generally used as an abbreviation beyond the Internet, where it is common, but not universal.

== Rating systems ==
With the invention of calculators and computers, it has become easy to calculate a rating for players based on the results of their games. Commonly used rating systems include the Elo and Glicko rating systems. Rating systems generally predict the probability that one player will defeat another player and use this prediction to rank a player's strength.

=== Elo ratings as used in Go ===
Elo Rating	Go rank
2940	9 dan professional
2910	8 dan professional
2880	7 dan professional
2850	6 dan professional
2820	5 dan professional
2790	4 dan professional
2760	3 dan professional
2730	2 dan professional
2700	7 dan amateur or 1 dan professional
2600	6 dan (amateur)
2500	5 dan
2400	4 dan
2300	3 dan
2200	2 dan
2100	1 dan
2000	1 kyu
1900	2 kyu
1800	3 kyu
1500	6 kyu
1000	11 kyu
500	16 kyu
100	20 kyu

The European Go Federation implementation of the Elo rating system attempts to establish rough correspondence between ratings and kyu/dan ranks. This is done by varying some of the components of the Elo formula to achieve a close match to the adjacent table. The probability (S_{E}) that the player with the lower rating, player A, wins against a higher rated player B is given by the formula

$$S_E(A) = \frac{1}{e^{D/a} + 1}$$

Where:

- D is the rating difference: $R_B - R_A\,$
- a is varied depending on the prior rating of player A.

The probability that player B wins is calculated as

$$S_E(B) = 1 - S_E(A)\,$$

The new rating of a player is calculated as

$$R_n = R_o + K(S - S_E)\,$$

- R_{n} = new rating
- R_{o} = old rating
- S = score (1, 0.5 or 0)
- S_{E} = expected score
- K is varied depending on the rating of the players

K is varied depending on the rating of the players, because of the low confidence in (lower) amateur ratings (high fluctuation in the outcome) but high confidence in pro ratings (stable, consistent play). K is 116 at rating 100 and 10 at rating 2700.

In the EGF system, the Elo points won by the winner almost equal the ones lost by the loser and the maximum points movement is the constant K (from above). However, there is a slight inflationary mechanism built into the ratings adjustment after each game to compensate for the fact that newcomers usually bring fewer ELO points into the pool than they take out with them when they cease active play. Other Elo-flavor ratings such as the AGA, IGS, and DGS systems use maximum likelihood estimation to adjust ratings, so those systems are anchored by prior distributions rather than by attempting to ensure that the gain/loss of ratings is zero sum.

=== Other rating systems ===
A variation of the Elo rating system called WHR ('Whole History Rating'), differs from standard Elo in that it retroactively re-rates players based on their entire history after each new result is added, rather than incrementally changing a player's rating on a game-by-game basis. This involves more intense computation than other methods, but is claimed that "in comparison to Elo, Glicko, TrueSkill, and decayed-history algorithms, WHR produces better predictions.". The website Go Ratings implements the WHR method to calculate global player rankings.

=== Rating base ===
The ratings of players are generally measured using the game results of Go competitions and tournaments. Most clubs and countries maintain their own ratings, as do Go playing servers.

In a small club, ranks may be decided informally and adjusted manually when players consistently win or lose. In larger clubs or country wide rating systems, a mathematical ranking system is generally easier to maintain. Players can then be promoted or demoted based on their strength as calculated from their wins and losses.

Most Go playing servers use a mathematical rating system to keep track of the playing strength of their members. Such ratings may or may not be translated to kyu and dan ranks for the convenience of the players.

Player pools that do not regularly mix (such as different countries, or sub-groups on online servers) often result in divergent playing strengths compared to the same nominal rank level of other groups. Players asked to give their rank will therefore often qualify it with "in my country" or "on this Internet server".

=== Winning probabilities ===
The rating indirectly represents the probability of winning an even game against other rated players. This probability depends only on the difference between the two players' ratings, but its magnitude varies greatly from one implementation to another. The American Go Association adopted a uniform standard deviation of 104, i.e. slightly more than one rank, while the European Go Federation ratings have a sliding standard of deviation from 200 for beginners down to 70 for top players. The IGS has a fixed standard deviation for all levels of play, but a non-standard distribution. The following table displays some of the differences:

Rating organisation	Rating				Winning % of the stronger player		
Rating organisation	2 kyu	1 kyu	1 dan	2 dan	1k vs. 2k	1d vs. 2k	2d vs. 2k
AGA	−250	−150	150	250	83.2%	97.3%	99.8%
EGF	1900	2000	2100	2200	71.3%	86.0%	93.9%
IGS	30	31	32	33	71.9%	84.2%	91.1%

=== Winning chances and handicaps in Go versus chess ===
While in chess a player must take some risks to avoid a draw, in Go draws (jigo) are either impossible (with superko and non-integer komi, such as 6.5 points, as is common) or less likely in the case of integer komi. Also, an average game of Go lasts for 240 moves (120 moves in chess terms), compared to 40 in chess, so there are more opportunities for a weaker player to make sub-optimal moves. The ability to transform a small advantage into a win increases with playing strength. Due to this ability, stronger players are more consistent in their results against weaker players and will generally score a higher percentage of wins against opponents at the same rank distance.
