= 5th Ing Cup =

The 5th Ing Cup began on 20 April 2004 and concluded on 5 March 2005. Chang Hao defeated Choi Cheol-han 3–1 in the finals.

The main tournament featured 24 players:

- China (8): Chang Hao, Gu Li, Kong Jie, Liu Xing, Ma Xiaochun, Peng Quan, Yu Bin, Zhou Heyang
- Japan (7): Hane Naoki, O Meien, O Rissei, Otake Hideo, Rin Kaiho, Yamashita Keigo, Yoda Norimoto
- Korea (5): Choi Cheol-han, Lee Chang-ho, Lee Sedol, Song Tae Kon, Yoo Changhyuk
- Taiwan (2): Cho U, Zhou Junxun
- North America (1): Jimmy Cha
- Europe (1): Alexandre Dinerchtein

Lee Chang-ho, Ma Xiaochun, Otake Hideo, Yoda Norimoto, Chang Hao, Rin Kaiho, O Meien, and Yu Bin were given first round byes.

== Tournament ==
Round of 16
22 April
(Japan) Yamashita Keigo	0
(South Korea) Lee Chang-ho	1
22 April
(South Korea) Choi Cheol-han	1
(China) Ma Xiaochun	0
22 April
(China) Zhou Heyang	1
(Japan) Otake Hideo	0
22 April
(China) Peng Quan	1
(Japan) Yoda Norimoto	0
22 April
(South Korea) Yoo Changhyuk	0
(China) Chang Hao	1
22 April
(China) Kong Jie	1
(Japan) Rin Kaiho	0
22 April
(Taiwan) Zhou Junxun	0
(Japan) O Meien	1
22 April
(South Korea) Song Tae Kon	1
(China) Yu Bin	0

Quarter-finals
24 April
Lee Chang-ho	0
Choi Cheol-han	1
24 April
Zhou Heyang	0
Peng Quan	1
24 April
Chang Hao	1
Kong Jie	0
24 April
O Meien	0
Song Tae Kon	1

Semi-finals
6–10 September
Choi Cheol-han	2
Peng Quan	1
6–10 September
Chang Hao	2
Song Tae Kon	1

Final
26 December–5 March
Choi Cheol-han	1
Chang Hao	3

== Finals ==
Player	1	2	3	4	5	T
(South Korea) Choi Cheol-han	B+R					1
(China) Chang Hao		B+R	W+R	B+3		3
