= 10th LG Cup =

The 10th LG Cup featured :

- 13 players from China - Chang Hao, Chen Yaoye, Gu Li, Kong Jie, Liu Shizhen, Liu Xing, Luo Xihe, Piao Wenyao, Qiu Jun, Wang Xi, Wang Yuhui, Yu Bin, Zhou Heyang
- 10 players from South Korea - Choi Cheol-han, Choi Myung-Hoon, Kim Gi-yeong, Kim Seong-ryong, Lee Chang-ho, Lee Sedol, Park Byeong-gyu, Park Jungsang, Park Young-Hoon, Yun Hyunsuk
- 6 players from Japan - Cho U, Hane Naoki, Kobayashi Koichi, O Rissei, So Yokoku, Yamashita Keigo
- 1 player from Taiwan - Zhou Junxun
- (United States) 1 player from North America - Huiren Yang
- 1 player from Europe - Alexandre Dinerchtein

Two of the 32 players were given automatic berths, Cho U, who won the 9th LG Cup, was placed at the top of the table. The runner up for the 9th LG Cup, Yu Bin, was placed at the bottom.

== Tournament ==
Round of 32
(Japan) Cho U (Holder)	1
(China) Kong Jie	0
(China) Zhou Heyang	1
(Europe) Alexandre Dinerchtein	0
(Japan) Kobayashi Koichi	1
(South Korea) Park Byeong-gyu	0
(China) Gu Li	1
(South Korea) Yun Hyun-seok	0
(South Korea) Kim Seong-ryong	1
(China) Liu Xing	0
(South Korea) Kim Gi-yeong	0
(China) Wang Yuhui	1
(China) Chang Hao	0
(Japan) Yamashita Keigo	1
(South Korea) Lee Sedol	1
(Japan) Hane Naoki	0
(China) Liu Shizhen	0
(South Korea) Park Young-Hoon	1
(Taiwan) Zhou Junxun	0
(China) Qiu Jun	1
(China) Chen Yaoye	1
(United States) Yang Huiren	0
(China) Wang Xi	0
(South Korea) Lee Chang-ho	1
(South Korea) Choi Cheol-han	0
(Japan) So Yokoku	1
(Japan) O Rissei	0
(China) Piao Wenyao	1
(China) Luo Xihe	1
(South Korea) Choi Myung-Hoon	0
(South Korea) Park Jungsang	1
(China) Yu Bin (Runner up)	0

Round of 16
Cho U	0
Zhou Heyang	1
Kobayashi Koichi	0
Gu Li	1
Kim Seong-ryong	0
Wang Yuhui	1
Yamashita Keigo	0
Lee Sedol	1
Park Young-Hoon	0
Qiu Jun	1
Chen Yaoye	1
Lee Chang-ho	0
So Yokoku	0
Piao Wenyao	1
Luo Xihe	0
Park Jungsang	1

Quarter-finals
Zhou Heyang	0
Gu Li	1
Wang Yuhui	0
Lee Sedol	1
Qiu Jun	0
Chen Yaoye	1
Piao Wenyao	1
Park Jungsang	0

Semi-finals
Gu Li	1
Lee Sedol	0
Chen Yaoye	1
Piao Wenyao	0

Final
Gu Li	3
Chen Yaoye	2

^{There was no third place game.}

== Final ==
Players	Game 1	Game 2	Game 3	Game 4	Game 5
(China) Gu Li	Won	Won	Loss	Loss	Won
(China) Chen Yaoye	Loss	Loss	Won	Won	Loss
