= List of world Go champions =

The following list shows champions at major international Go tournaments.

== Competitions ==
Each of the following competitions has been competed between 16 or more players for an over $150,000 prize. Go associations are recognising the two requirements as standards of major tournaments.

Competition	Period	Editions	Current champion
Fujitsu Cup	1988–2011	24	Defunct
Ing Cup	1988–present	10	Ichiriki Ryo
Tongyang Cup (Note: The 1st (1988–89) and 2nd (1989–90) Tongyang Cups are not recognised as major competitions.)	1990–1998	7	Defunct
Samsung Fire Cup	1996–present	31	Byun Sangil
LG Cup	1996–present	31	Wang Xinghao
Chunlan Cup	1998–present	15	Yang Kaiwen
World Oza	2002–2009	4	Defunct
BC Card Cup	2009–2012	4	Defunct
Bailing Cup	2012–2019	4	Defunct
MLily Cup	2013–present	5	Li Xuanhao
Xinao Cup	2016–2017	1	Defunct
Tianfu Cup	2018	1	Defunct
Quzhou-Lanke Cup	2023–present	4	Shin Jinseo
Nanyang Cup	2024–present	1	Shin Jinseo
Beihai Xinyi Cup	2025–present	1	Wang Xinghao
Shinhan Bank Cup	2025–present	1	Park Junghwan
Total		144	—

== Champions ==
No.	Competition	Closing date	Champion	Association
1	1st Fujitsu Cup	3 September 1988	Takemiya Masaki	Japan
2	2nd Fujitsu Cup	5 August 1989	Takemiya Masaki	Japan
3	1st Ing Cup	5 September 1989	Cho Hunhyun	South Korea
4	3rd Fujitsu Cup	4 August 1990	Rin Kaiho	Japan
5	4th Fujitsu Cup	3 August 1991	Cho Chikun	Japan (Note: Born in South Korea, Cho Chikun was attached to Nihon Ki-in.)
6	3rd Tongyang Cup	27 January 1992	Lee Changho	South Korea
7	5th Fujitsu Cup	1 August 1992	Otake Hideo	Japan
8	2nd Ing Cup	20 May 1993	Seo Bongsoo	South Korea
9	4th Tongyang Cup	8 June 1993	Lee Changho	South Korea
10	6th Fujitsu Cup	7 August 1993	Yoo Changhyuk	South Korea
11	5th Tongyang Cup	22 June 1994	Cho Hunhyun	South Korea
12	7th Fujitsu Cup	6 August 1994	Cho Hunhyun	South Korea
13	6th Tongyang Cup	24 May 1995	Ma Xiaochun	China
14	8th Fujitsu Cup	5 August 1995	Ma Xiaochun	China
15	7th Tongyang Cup	20 March 1996	Lee Changho	South Korea
16	9th Fujitsu Cup	3 August 1996	Lee Changho	South Korea
17	3rd Ing Cup	6 November 1996	Yoo Changhyuk	South Korea
18	1st Samsung Fire Cup	29 November 1996	Yoda Norimoto	Japan
19	8th Tongyang Cup	18 April 1997	Cho Hunhyun	South Korea
20	1st LG Cup	19 May 1997	Lee Changho	South Korea
21	10th Fujitsu Cup	2 August 1997	Kobayashi Koichi	Japan
22	2nd Samsung Fire Cup	28 November 1997	Lee Changho	South Korea
23	2nd LG Cup	23 March 1998	Ō Rissei	Japan (Note: Born in Taiwan, Ō Rissei was attached to Nihon Ki-in.)
24	9th Tongyang Cup	13 May 1998	Lee Changho	South Korea
25	11th Fujitsu Cup	1 August 1998	Lee Changho	South Korea
26	3rd Samsung Fire Cup	8 February 1999	Lee Changho	South Korea
27	3rd LG Cup	10 May 1999	Lee Changho	South Korea
28	1st Chunlan Cup	29 June 1999	Cho Hunhyun	South Korea
29	12th Fujitsu Cup	7 August 1999	Yoo Changhyuk	South Korea
30	4th Samsung Fire Cup	7 December 1999	Lee Changho	South Korea
31	4th LG Cup	10 May 2000	Yu Bin	China
32	2nd Chunlan Cup	22 June 2000	Ō Rissei	Japan
33	13th Fujitsu Cup	12 August 2000	Cho Hunhyun	South Korea
34	5th Samsung Fire Cup	14 December 2000	Yoo Changhyuk	South Korea
35	4th Ing Cup	16 February 2001	Lee Changho	South Korea
36	5th LG Cup	19 May 2001	Lee Changho	South Korea
37	3rd Chunlan Cup	26 June 2001	Yoo Changhyuk	South Korea
38	14th Fujitsu Cup	4 August 2001	Cho Hunhyun	South Korea
39	6th Samsung Fire Cup	14 December 2001	Cho Hunhyun	South Korea
40	6th LG Cup	1 April 2002	Yoo Changhyuk	South Korea
41	15th Fujitsu Cup	3 August 2002	Lee Sedol	South Korea
42	7th Samsung Fire Cup	14 January 2003	Cho Hunhyun	South Korea
43	1st World Oza	29 January 2003	Lee Changho	South Korea
44	4th Chunlan Cup	18 March 2003	Lee Changho	South Korea
45	7th LG Cup	27 March 2003	Lee Sedol	South Korea
46	16th Fujitsu Cup	7 July 2003	Lee Sedol	South Korea
47	8th Samsung Fire Cup	11 December 2003	Cho Chikun	Japan
48	8th LG Cup	1 April 2004	Lee Changho	South Korea
49	17th Fujitsu Cup	5 July 2004	Park Yeonghun	South Korea
50	9th Samsung Fire Cup	9 December 2004	Lee Sedol	South Korea
51	2nd World Oza	8 January 2005	Lee Sedol	South Korea
52	5th Ing Cup	5 March 2005	Chang Hao	China
53	5th Chunlan Cup	18 March 2005	Lee Changho	South Korea
54	9th LG Cup	20 April 2005	Cho U	Japan (Note: Born in Taiwan, Cho U was attached to Nihon Ki-in.)
55	18th Fujitsu Cup	4 July 2005	Lee Sedol	South Korea
56	10th Samsung Fire Cup	13 January 2006	Luo Xihe	China
57	10th LG Cup	21 April 2006	Gu Li	China
58	19th Fujitsu Cup	3 July 2006	Park Jungsang	South Korea
59	3rd World Oza	9 January 2007	Lee Sedol	South Korea
60	11th Samsung Fire Cup	24 January 2007	Chang Hao	China
61	11th LG Cup	22 March 2007	Chou Chunhsun	Taiwan
62	6th Chunlan Cup	25 March 2007	Gu Li	China
63	20th Fujitsu Cup	9 July 2007	Park Yeonghun	South Korea
64	12th Samsung Fire Cup	24 January 2008	Lee Sedol	South Korea
65	12th LG Cup	28 February 2008	Lee Sedol	South Korea
66	21st Fujitsu Cup	7 July 2008	Gu Li	China
67	4th World Oza	8 January 2009	Gu Li	China
68	13th Samsung Fire Cup	21 January 2009	Lee Sedol	South Korea
69	13th LG Cup	25 February 2009	Gu Li	China
70	6th Ing Cup	23 April 2009	Choi Cheolhan	South Korea
71	1st BC Card Cup	4 May 2009	Gu Li	China
72	7th Chunlan Cup	24 June 2009	Chang Hao	China
73	22nd Fujitsu Cup	6 July 2009	Kang Dongyun	South Korea
74	14th Samsung Fire Cup	17 December 2009	Kong Jie	China
75	14th LG Cup	24 February 2010	Kong Jie	China
76	2nd BC Card Cup	27 April 2010	Lee Sedol	South Korea
77	23rd Fujitsu Cup	5 July 2010	Kong Jie	China
78	15th Samsung Fire Cup	10 December 2010	Gu Li	China
79	15th LG Cup	23 February 2011	Piao Wenyao	China
80	3rd BC Card Cup	28 April 2011	Lee Sedol	South Korea
81	8th Chunlan Cup	30 June 2011	Lee Sedol	South Korea
82	24th Fujitsu Cup	14 August 2011	Park Junghwan	South Korea
83	16th Samsung Fire Cup	7 December 2011	Won Seongjin	South Korea
84	16th LG Cup	15 February 2012	Jiang Weijie	China
85	4th BC Card Cup	16 May 2012	Paek Hongsuk	South Korea
86	17th Samsung Fire Cup	13 December 2012	Lee Sedol	South Korea
87	1st Bailing Cup	19 January 2013	Zhou Ruiyang	China
88	17th LG Cup	20 February 2013	Shi Yue	China
89	7th Ing Cup	6 March 2013	Fan Tingyu	China
90	9th Chunlan Cup	20 June 2013	Chen Yaoye	China
91	1st MLily Cup	6 December 2013	Mi Yuting	China
92	18th Samsung Fire Cup	11 December 2013	Tang Weixing	China
93	18th LG Cup	13 February 2014	Tuo Jiaxi	China
94	19th Samsung Fire Cup	10 December 2014	Kim Jiseok	South Korea
95	2nd Bailing Cup	14 January 2015	Ke Jie	China
96	19th LG Cup	12 February 2015	Park Junghwan	South Korea
97	10th Chunlan Cup	3 June 2015	Gu Li	China
98	20th Samsung Fire Cup	9 December 2015	Ke Jie	China
99	2nd MLily Cup	5 January 2016	Ke Jie	China
100	20th LG Cup	4 February 2016	Kang Dongyun	South Korea
101	8th Ing Cup	26 October 2016	Tang Weixing	China
102	21st Samsung Fire Cup	8 December 2016	Ke Jie	China
103	3rd Bailing Cup	16 December 2016	Chen Yaoye	China
104	21st LG Cup	8 February 2017	Dang Yifei	China
105	11th Chunlan Cup	26 June 2017	Tan Xiao	China
106	22nd Samsung Fire Cup	7 December 2017	Gu Zihao	China
107	Xinao Cup	26 December 2017	Ke Jie	China
108	3rd MLily Cup	2 January 2018	Park Junghwan	South Korea
109	22nd LG Cup	8 February 2018	Xie Erhao	China
110	23rd Samsung Fire Cup	5 December 2018	Ke Jie	China
111	Tianfu Cup	26 December 2018	Chen Yaoye	China
112	4th Bailing Cup	17 January 2019	Ke Jie	China
113	23rd LG Cup	14 February 2019	Yang Dingxin	China
114	12th Chunlan Cup	27 June 2019	Park Junghwan	South Korea
115	24th Samsung Fire Cup	6 September 2019	Tang Weixing	China
116	24th LG Cup	12 February 2020	Shin Jinseo	South Korea
117	25th Samsung Fire Cup	3 November 2020	Ke Jie	China
118	25th LG Cup	4 February 2021	Shin Minjun	South Korea
119	4th MLily Cup	5 May 2021	Mi Yuting	China
120	13th Chunlan Cup	15 September 2021	Shin Jinseo	South Korea
121	26th Samsung Fire Cup	3 November 2021	Park Junghwan	South Korea
122	26th LG Cup	9 February 2022	Shin Jinseo	South Korea
123	27th Samsung Fire Cup	8 November 2022	Shin Jinseo	South Korea
124	27th LG Cup	1 February 2023	Ding Hao	China
125	1st Quzhou-Lanke Cup	17 June 2023	Gu Zihao	China
126	14th Chunlan Cup	19 July 2023	Byun Sangil	South Korea
127	9th Ing Cup	23 August 2023	Shin Jinseo	South Korea
128	28th Samsung Fire Cup	28 November 2023	Ding Hao	China
129	28th LG Cup	31 January 2024	Shin Jinseo	South Korea
130	5th MLily Cup	4 May 2024	Li Xuanhao	China
131	2nd Quzhou-Lanke Cup	21 August 2024	Shin Jinseo	South Korea
132	10th Ing Cup	8 September 2024	Ichiriki Ryo	Japan
133	29th Samsung Fire Cup	22 November 2024	Ding Hao	China
134	29th LG Cup	23 January 2025	Byun Sangil	South Korea
135	Nanyang Cup	28 February 2025	Shin Jinseo	South Korea
136	Beihai Xinyi Cup	18 April 2025	Wang Xinghao	China
137	15th Chunlan Cup	23 June 2025	Yang Kaiwen	China
138	3rd Quzhou-Lanke Cup	15 October 2025	Dang Yifei	China
139	30th Samsung Fire Cup	17 November 2025	Liao Yuanhe	China
140	30th LG Cup	15 January 2026	Shin Minjun	South Korea
141	Shinhan Bank Cup	27 February 2026	Park Junghwan	South Korea
142	31st LG Cup	16 June 2026	Wang Xinghao	China
143	4th Quzhou-Lanke Cup	15 October 2026	Shin Jinseo	South Korea
144	31st Samsung Fire Cup	20 November 2026	Byun Sangil	South Korea

== Statistics ==
=== Performance by player ===
Rank	Player	Association	Titles
1	Lee Changho	South Korea	17
2	Lee Sedol	South Korea	14
3	Cho Hunhyun	South Korea	9
3	Shin Jinseo	South Korea	9
5	Gu Li	China	8
5	Ke Jie	China	8
7	Yoo Changhyuk	South Korea	6
7	Park Junghwan	South Korea	6
9	Chang Hao	China	3
9	Kong Jie	China	3
9	Tang Weixing	China	3
9	Chen Yaoye	China	3
9	Ding Hao	China	3
9	Byun Sangil	South Korea	3

=== Performance by association ===
Rank	Association	Titles
1	South Korea (Korea Baduk Association)	76
2	China (Chinese Weiqi Association)	55
3	Japan (Nihon Ki-in)	12
4	Taiwan (Taiwan Chi Yuan Culture Foundation)	1
Total		144

== See also ==
- List of Go players
- List of professional Go tournaments
- World Amateur Go Championship
