= 6th Ing Cup =

The 6th Ing Cup began on 30 April 2008 and concluded on 23 April 2009. Choi Cheol-han won the title, beating Lee Chang-ho 3–1 in the finals.

The main tournament featured 24 players:

- China (10): Chang Hao, Gu Li, Hu Yaoyu, Kong Jie, Liu Xing, Peng Quan, Piao Wenyao, Wang Lei, Xie He, Zhou Heyang
- Korea (6): Choi Cheol-han, Lee Chang-ho, Lee Sedol, Lee Younggu, Pak Yeong-hun, Song Tae Kon
- Japan (4): Cho Chikun, O Meien, Takao Shinji, Yamashita Keigo
- Taiwan (2): Cho U, Zhou Junxun
- North America (1): Jiang Mingjiu
- Europe (1): Catalin Taranu

Chang Hao, Lee Chang-ho, Kong Jie, Zhou Heyang, Choi Cheol-han, Song Tae kon, O Meien, and Peng Quan were given first round byes.

== Tournament ==
Round of 16
2 May
(Japan) Cho Chikun	1
(China) Chang Hao	0
2 May
(China) Xie He	0
(South Korea) Lee Chang-ho	1
2 May
(China) Wang Lei	0
(China) Kong Jie	1
2 May
(South Korea) Lee Sedol	1
(China) Zhou Heyang	0
2 May
(China) Gu Li	0
(South Korea) Choi Cheol-han	1
2 May
(China) Piao Wenyao	1
(South Korea) Song Tae Kon	0
2 May
(China) Liu Xing	1
(Japan) O Meien	0
2 May
(South Korea) Pak Yeong-hun	1
(China) Peng Quan	0

Quarter-finals
4 May
Cho Chikun	0
Lee Chang-ho	1
4 May
Kong Jie	0
Lee Sedol	1
4 May
Choi Cheol-han	1
Piao Wenyao	0
4 May
Liu Xing	1
Pak Yeong-hun	0

Semi-finals
23–27 September
Lee Chang-ho	2
Lee Sedol	0
23–27 September
Choi Cheol-han	2
Liu Xing	0

Final
3 March–23 April
Lee Chang-ho	1
Choi Cheol-han	3

== Finals ==
Player	1	2	3	4	5	T
(South Korea) Lee Chang-ho	W+3					1
(South Korea) Choi Cheol-han		W+7	B+R	W+R		3
