= 1st Nongshim Cup =

1999–2000 Go competition

The 1st Nongshim Cup was the inaugural edition of the team Go tournament consisting of five players each from China, Japan and South Korea. The tournament began on 16 December 1999 in Shanghai and finished on 28 March 2000. On Lee Chang-ho and Ma Xiaochun met in the final, with Lee defeating China's top player and leading Korea to their first of six straight Nongshim Cup titles.

== Teams ==
Preliminaries were held in Korea, while Japan and China sent pre-selected teams. Players listed in order that they appeared for their respective teams.

China

- Qiu Jun
- Luo Xihe
- Wang Lei
- Chang Hao
- Ma Xiaochun

Japan

- Yamashita Keigo
- Kudo Norio
- Yoda Norimoto
- Yamada Kimio
- Cho Sonjin

South Korea

- Mok Jin-seok
- Kim Yeong-sam
- Cho Hunhyun
- Yoo Changhyuk
- Lee Chang-ho

== Tournament ==
Mok Jin-seok of Korea defeated Yamashita Keigo in the first game. He would go on to defeat China representative Qiu Jun before losing to Japanese player Kudo Norio on 19 December. Luo Xihe beat Kudo Norio before the tournament moved to Tokyo.

Luo lost to Kim Yeong-sam of Korea, who then lost to Japan's Yoda Norimoto. Korea's Cho Hunhyun defeated Yoda after the Japanese representative eliminated China's Wang Lei from the tournament. The third and final stage moved to Seoul. Korea had three players left (including Hunhyun), while China (Chang Hao and Ma Xiaochun) and Japan (Cho Sonjin and Yamada Kimio) were left with two players each.

Cho Hunhyun would lose the opening match of the third stage to Chang, who then stringed together two more victories by defeating Yamada (Japan) and Yoo Changhyuk (Korea). Cho Sonjin of Japan defeated Chang, but then lost his next match against Korea's Lee Chang-ho.

=== First stage ===
Players	First round	Second round	Third round	Fourth round
(South Korea) Mok Jin-seok	Mok Jin-seok	Mok Jin-seok	Kudo Norio	Luo Xihe
(Japan) Yamashita Keigo	Mok Jin-seok	Mok Jin-seok	Kudo Norio	Luo Xihe
(China) Qiu Jun		Mok Jin-seok	Kudo Norio	Luo Xihe
(Japan) Kudo Norio			Kudo Norio	Luo Xihe
(China) Luo Xihe				Luo Xihe

=== Second stage ===
Players	First round	Second round	Third round	Fourth round
(China) Luo Xihe	Kim Yeong-sam	Yoda Norimoto	Yoda Norimoto	Cho Hunhyun
(South Korea) Kim Yeong-sam	Kim Yeong-sam	Yoda Norimoto	Yoda Norimoto	Cho Hunhyun
(Japan) Yoda Norimoto		Yoda Norimoto	Yoda Norimoto	Cho Hunhyun
(China) Wang Lei			Yoda Norimoto	Cho Hunhyun
(South Korea) Cho Hunhyun				Cho Hunhyun

=== Third stage ===
Players	First round	Second round	Third round	Fourth round	Fifth round	Sixth round
(South Korea) Cho Hunhyun	Chang Hao	Chang Hao	Chang Hao	Cho Sonjin	Lee Chang-ho	Lee Chang-ho
(China) Chang Hao	Chang Hao	Chang Hao	Chang Hao	Cho Sonjin	Lee Chang-ho	Lee Chang-ho
(Japan) Yamada Kimio		Chang Hao	Chang Hao	Cho Sonjin	Lee Chang-ho	Lee Chang-ho
(South Korea) Yoo Changhyuk			Chang Hao	Cho Sonjin	Lee Chang-ho	Lee Chang-ho
(Japan) Cho Sonjin				Cho Sonjin	Lee Chang-ho	Lee Chang-ho
(South Korea) Lee Chang-ho					Lee Chang-ho	Lee Chang-ho
(China) Ma Xiaochun						Lee Chang-ho
