= Kang Dong-yun =

South Korean Go player

Kang Dongyun
Personal information
- Native name: 강동윤 (Korean); 姜東潤 (Korean); Gang Dongyun (Revised Romanization); Kang Tongyun (McCune–Reischauer)
- Born: January 23, 1989 (age 37) Seoul, South Korea

Sport
- Turned pro: 2002
- Teacher: Kwon Kab-ryong
- Rank: 9 dan
- Affiliation: Hanguk Kiwon

Kang Dong-yun
Medal record

Representing South Korea

Asian Games
Gold medal – first place	2010 Guangzhou	Men's Team

Kang Dongyun (born January 23, 1989) is a professional Go player.

== Biography ==
Kang became a professional in 2002. In 2007, he was promoted to the rank of 7 dan. He is a disciple of Kwon Kab-ryong. He is now a 9-dan professional player.

He is one of the most promising go players. His current record in the 2007 Korean Baduk League is 7 wins 1 loss. So far in this tournament he beat some of the top Korean players like Cho Hunhyun, Lee Chang-ho, Mok Jin-seok and Cho Han-seung. Kang had a remarkable result in the 10th Nongshim Cup, beating the dominant player of the first stage, Tuo Jiaxi (who had beaten all four of his opponents), and going on to win against Kimio Yamada, Piao Wenyao, Naoki Hane and Qiu Jun in the respective order for 5 straight wins. His reign was ended by Shinji Takao, who was, at that stage, the last remaining member of the Japanese team. Though it was a difficult loss with white, as all of Kang's matches beforehand had been with black, it still made the Korean Team gain an advantage in members remaining, and with fellow Korean baduk kings Lee Se-dol and Lee Chang-ho remaining, Korea was still the strongest contender for the cup. The Chinese team had world number 2 Gu Li and former champion Chang Hao, but the rivalry between the two Lee's and Gu and Chang made the matches seem extra important. However, Lee Chang-ho never got to play, as Lee Se-dol defeated both Chang Hao and Gu Li.

Kang played Park Yeong-hun in the semifinals at the 22nd Fujitsu Cup, defeating Park in 200 moves. This was the first time Kang had ever been in a World Go Championship final. In the final, he went up against Lee Chang-ho, who defeated Chang Hao by 4 1/2 points with black in the semifinals. Kang prevailed in the final, defeating Lee with white by two and a half points to win his first world championship.

After several years of decent international tournament placings, Kang made another breakthrough to reach the final of the 2015-16 edition of the LG Cup, alongside compatriot Park Yeong-hun. He defeated Park 2–1 in the final to win his second world championship.

== Promotion record ==
Rank	Year	Notes
1 dan	2002	Promoted to professional dan rank after passing qualifying test.
2 dan	2003	
3 dan	2004	
4 dan	2005	
5 dan	2006	
6 dan		
7 dan	2007	
8 dan	2008	
9 dan	2008	

== Titles and runners-up ==
Domestic
Title	Wins	Runners-up
Myungin		1 (2008)
Chunwon	1 (2008)	1 (2007)
KBS Cup		1 (2010)
Maxim Cup		1 (2010)
Olleh KT Cup		1 (2010)
King of Kings	1 (2007)	
SK Gas Cup	1 (2005)	
New Pro Strongest	2 (2005, 2007)	
Total	5	5

Continental
Title	Wins	Runners-up
China-Korea Tengen		1 (2009)
Total	0	1

International
Title	Wins	Runners-up
LG CUP	1 (2016)	
Fujitsu Cup	1 (2009)	
World Mind Sports Games Male Individual	1 (2008)	
Total	3	0

- Total: 8 titles, 6 runners-up.
