= Kong Jie =

Chinese professional Go player (born 1982)

Kong Jie 孔杰
Personal information
- Born: November 25, 1982 (age 43) Beijing, China

Sport
- Turned pro: 1994
- Teacher: Liu Xiaoguang
- Rank: 9 dan
- Affiliation: Zhongguo Qiyuan

Kong Jie
- Traditional Chinese: 孔傑
- Simplified Chinese: 孔杰
Transcriptions
Standard Mandarin
- Hanyu Pinyin: Kǒng Jié

Kong Jie
Medal record

Representing China

Asian Games
Silver medal – second place	2010 Guangzhou	Men's Team

Kong Jie (Chinese: 孔杰; pinyin: Kǒng Jié; born 25 November 1982) is a Chinese professional Go player.

== Biography ==
Kong Jie turned professional in 1994 at the age of 12. He was promoted to 7-dan after eight years in 2001. In 2004 he was sent into the Teda Cup as China's representative against Lee Chang-ho and Yoda Norimoto. Kong Jie is China's 29th professional 9-dan, doing so by being runner-up in the 13th Samsung Cup, and entering the finals of the Asian TV Cup for the first time. In 2009, Kong Jie achieved a major international breakthrough by winning the Asian TV Cup—defeating Korea's top three players of Lee Sedol, Lee Chang-ho and Kang Dongyun respectively. His win marked the end of several years of poor personal international results. Later in the year, Kong Jie followed up by reaching the semi-finals of the 14th Samsung Cup and won the title by defeating his two compatriots Gu Li and Qiu Jun.

In 2010, Kong Jie passed the preliminary rounds of the 14th LG Cup to face former champion Lee Chang-ho in the finals. Kong won the match 2–0 and also the tournament. Later in the year, Kong Jie successfully defended his Asian TV Cup, defeating Korea's Lee Chang-ho and Japan's Yuki Satoshi. He followed that with another big win over a red hot Lee Sedol, to win the 23rd Fujitsu Cup. He arguably cemented his status as the 2010 world's strongest Go player. In 2011, Kong overcame compatriot Meng Tailing to again reach the LG Cup Final, but was unable to defend his title against another compatriot, Piao Wenyao, thus allowing the latter to win his first world title and be promoted to 9-dan professional on the merit of winning a world championship.

This was the last international final Kong played in. Within the next few years, with the rise of new 1990s generation professionals and the increased competition at the international level, only Gu Li and Lee Sedol would continue to have high tournament placings in big international tournaments. During the 15th Samsung Cup, Kong defeated a soon to be wedded Lee Chang-Ho before succumbing to Kim Ji-Seok in the quarterfinals. The match, with Kong playing Black, turned out to be a crucial "fight to the death" of both sides' dragons, but Kong miscalculated a combination by Kim on move 150, and on move 202, resigned, thus failing to defend his crown.

== Style ==
Kong Jie is considered to be an expert at life and death problems. In China he is known as the King of Tsumego (King Kong).

== Promotion record ==
Rank	Year	Notes
1 dan	1994	Promoted to professional dan rank for performance in the Chinese professional qualification tournament.
2 dan	1995	Promoted for performance in the Chinese professional promotion tournament.
3 dan	1996	Promoted for performance in the Chinese professional promotion tournament.
4 dan	1997	Promoted for performance in the Chinese professional promotion tournament.
5 dan	1999	Promoted for performance in the Chinese professional promotion tournament.
6 dan	2001	Promoted for performance in the Chinese professional promotion tournament.
7 dan	2002	Promoted for performance in the Chinese professional promotion tournament.
8 dan	2009	Skipped due to the Chinese Weiqi Association promotion rules.
9 dan	2009	Reached the final of the 13th Samsung Cup and 21st Asian TV Cup.

== Career record ==
As of 10 June 2018

Year	Won	Lost	Win %
1995	1	0	100%
1996	1	2	33.3%
1997	6	7	46.2%
1998	7	11	38.9%
1999	8	9	47.1%
2000	20	23	46.5%
2001	44	19	69.8%
2002	44	24	64.7%
2003	45	15	75.0%
2004	44	17	72.1%
2005	40	25	61.5%
2006	54	28	65.9%
2007	50	22	69.4%
2008	45	29	60.8%
2009	50	27	64.9%
2010	50	24	67.6%
2011	40	34	54.1%
2012	43	37	53.8%
2013	32	31	50.8%
2014	21	17	55.3%
2015	4	3	57.1%
2016	1	1	50.0%
Total	650	405	61.6%

== Titles and runners-up ==
As of 1 January 2019

Ranks #7 in total number of titles in China and tied for #6 in total International Majors titles.

Domestic
Title	Wins	Runners-up
National Sports Mass Meeting	1 (2000)	1 (2010)
National Go Individual	2 (2001, 2003)	
Xinren Wang	1 (2003)	
Ahan Tongshan Cup		2 (2003, 2007)
Ricoh Cup	2 (2003, 2010)	1 (2002)
Changqi Cup	2 (2004, 2006)	1 (2005)
Qiwang	2 (2004, 2009)	1 (2001)
Longxing		1 (2008)
NEC Cup		2 (2008–2009)
CCTV Cup	1 (2009)	
Total	11	9
Continental
Title	Wins	Runners-up
China-Korea New Pro Wang	1 (2003)	
Total	1	0
International
Title	Wins	Runners-up
Samsung Cup	1 (2009)	1 (2008)
LG Cup	1 (2010)	1 (2011)
Fujitsu Cup	1 (2010)	
Asian TV Cup	3 (2009–2011)	1 (2012)
Total	6	3
Career Total
Total	18	12

== Head-to-head record vs selected players ==
As of 10 June 2018

Players who have won international go titles in bold.

- (China) **Gu Li** 18:26
- (China) Hu Yaoyu 24:13
- (China) Liu Xing 13:13
- (China) **Chang Hao** 11:15
- (China) Qiu Jun 21:4
- (South Korea) **Lee Sedol** 7:18
- (China) **Zhou Ruiyang** 12:11
- (China) **Wang Xi** 13:9
- (China) Li Zhe 12:9
- (China) **Zhou Heyang** 12:9
- (China) Peng Quan 12:8
- (China) Xie He 10:9
- (China) **Jiang Weijie** 9:9
- (China) Wang Lei 10:7
- (South Korea) **Lee Changho** 8:8
- (China) Ding Wei 10:5
- (China) Niu Yutian 10:5
- (China) Wang Yao 8:7
- (China) **Yu Bin** 8:7
- (China) **Piao Wenyao** 6:9
- (China) Liu Shizhen 4:10
- (China) Wang Yuhui 10:3
- (China) **Chen Yaoye** 6:6
- (South Korea) **Choi Cheolhan** 5:7
