= Luo Xihe =

Chinese professional Go player (born 1977)

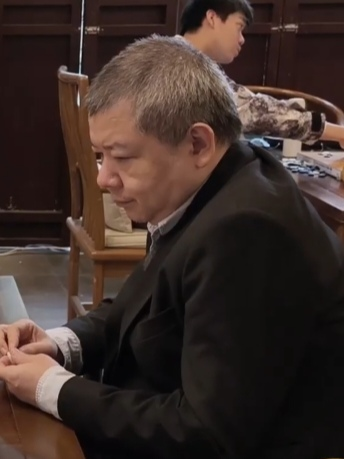
- Luo at 2024 6th Nie Weiping Cup

Personal information
- Native name: Trad. 羅洗河 Simp. 罗洗河 (Chinese); Luó Xǐhé (Pinyin)
- Full name: Luo Xihe
- Born: November 23, 1977 (age 48) Hunan, China

Sport
- Turned pro: 1989
- Teacher: Luo Jianwen, Ma Xiaochun,
- Rank: 9 dan
- Affiliation: Chinese Weiqi Association

Luo Xihe (simplified Chinese: 罗洗河; traditional Chinese: 羅洗河; pinyin: Luó Xǐhé; born November 23, 1977) is a Chinese professional Go player.

== Biography ==
Luo Xihe started learning Go at the age of six. He turned pro in 1989, and was promoted to 9 dan in 2002. At a very young age, the Chinese Weiqi Association was able to perform an IQ test on many of its young professionals during the late '80s to early '90s, and Luo was able to score higher than all of his compatriots, which included the likes of Chang Hao, Zhou Heyang, Shao Weigang and Wang Lei. Although Luo's gift was recognized, domestically and internationally he was not able to perform very well and did not gain any significant titles. His biggest breakthrough came in the 7th Samsung Cup where he reached the quarterfinals, and facing eventual champion Cho Hunhyun, was able to play a famous game later known as the comeback game for Cho, dubbed "Capturing and Releasing Cho" (a reference to the historical capture of Cao Cao during the Huarong Trail). After that game, Luo was not able to come close to playing in another major tournament again, only settling for playing in the qualifying competitions.

His biggest breakthrough came in the 10th Samsung Cup, where he was able to play through a series of qualifying rounds to reach the round of 32 of the main tournament. In this tournament, he faced Cho Han-seung, Song Tae-kon in the first 2 rounds, before playing defending champion Lee Sedol in the quarterfinals. Luo considered his first round match with Cho as his hardest, whilst against Song, he was able to play a cunning trap that lured Song into a false sense of security. Prior to the start of the quarter-finals, all the Japanese Go players had been defeated, and only 2 Chinese players, including Luo, remained. The other was Hu Yaoyu, whilst 5 of the top Korean players, Lee Chang-ho, Choi Cheol-han, Lee Sedol, Yoo Chang-hyuk and Cho Hunhyun remained. Against a surging Lee Sedol, who had won 29 games with 2 losses across all international tournaments, Luo was able to gain the upper hand in the opening of the match, and due to many decisive errors by Lee, Luo was able to slowly outplay Lee throughout the entire board, culminating in Lee resigning due to having insufficient territory after playing a very bad ko fight in the top left corner. Experts showed the final variations as Lee losing 1 of 2 very large territories on the board. After this match, Luo was able to reach the semi-finals of an international tournament for the first time in his career. At the same time, Hu was able to progress, whilst Cho was defeated by Choi.

== Titles & runners-up ==
Title	Years Held
Current	3
(China) NEC Cup	2001
(China) CCTV Cup	2006
(China) National Go Individual	2000
Current	1
(South Korea) (Japan) (China) (Taiwan) Samsung Cup	2006
Total	4

Title	Years Lost
Current	5
(China) Mingren	1994, 1997
(China) CCTV Cup	2000
(China) Ahan Tongshan Cup	2006
(China) Xinren Wang	1998
Total	5
