= Gu Li (Go player) =

Chinese professional Go player (born 1983)

Gu Li 古力
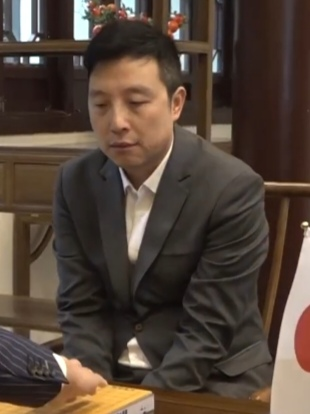
- Gu at 2024 6th Nie Weiping Cup

Personal information
- Born: February 3, 1983 (age 43) Chongqing, China

Sport
- Turned pro: 1995
- Teacher: Nie Weiping
- Rank: 9 dan
- Affiliation: Chinese Weiqi Association

Gu Li
- Traditional Chinese: 古力
- Simplified Chinese: 古力
Transcriptions
Standard Mandarin
- Hanyu Pinyin: Gǔ Lì

Gu Li
Medal record

Representing China

Asian Games
Silver medal – second place	2010 Guangzhou	Men's Team

Gu Li (Chinese: 古力; pinyin: Gǔ Lì; born February 3, 1983) is a Chinese professional Go player.

== Biography ==
Gu Li became a pro in 1995 when he was only 12. In 2006, he won the 10th LG Cup and became the youngest Chinese player to ever win a major international title; as a result, he was also promoted to 9 dan. In March 2007, he defeated Chang Hao 2-0 to win the Chunlan Cup. In mid-2007, Gu Li experienced a playing slump, even losing many matches against lower dan players. However, he soon came back stronger than ever, winning many major titles both domestic and international, including the 2007 Changqi Cup and the 2008 Fujitsu Cup; the greatest factors in this turnaround was his improvement in the endgame, and territory skills, which many people had previously considered his biggest weaknesses. In 2009 Gu defeated Lee Sedol to win the 13th LG Cup.

In July 2010, Gu Li became the "Meijin of Meijins" by defeating Lee Changho and Iyama Yuta in a special tournament which pitted the domestic title-holders from China, Korea and Japan against each other.

In October 2010, Gu Li defeated Han Sanghoon and Lee Sedol in the round of sixteen and quarter-finals respectively to reach the semi-finals of the 15th Samsung Cup, whilst the defending Champion Kong Jie was knocked out by Kim Jiseok. Gu won the 2010 Samsung Cup, defeating Heo Youngho of Korea, and moves on towards the 2012 Ing Cup to become the second player to win all major international titles (Although Lee Chang-ho is the first and so far only person to win all titles, including the defunct World Oza and Zhonghuan Cup, as well as the Tong Yang Cup).

In 2014, Gu Li was defeated in a jubango against Lee Sedol (+2-6). The games took place on each last Sunday of the month.

== Style ==
His given name Li, literally meaning strength, is also a Go term roughly meaning the ability of reading. Li also encompasses the meaning of the ability to discover strong moves and the ability to fight. Gu has a nickname "Gu Da Li". Da literally means large, big or huge. This refers to Gu's incredible ability at playing really strong moves that require sharp instinct as well as immaculate reading. One of his main weaknesses is his inaccurate endgame.

== Promotion record ==
Rank	Year	Notes
1 dan	1995	Promoted to professional dan rank for performance in the Chinese professional qualification tournament.
2 dan	1996	Promoted for performance in the Chinese professional promotion tournament.
3 dan	1997	Promoted for performance in the Chinese professional promotion tournament.
4 dan	1998	Promoted for performance in the Chinese professional promotion tournament.
5 dan	2000	Promoted for performance in the Chinese professional promotion tournament.
6 dan	2002	Skipped due to the Chinese Weiqi Association promotion rules.
7 dan	2002	Won the 4th China-Korea New Pro Wang against Cho Hanseung.
8 dan	2006	Skipped due to the Chinese Weiqi Association promotion rules.
9 dan	2006	Won the 10th LG Cup against Chen Yaoye.

== Career record ==
As of 1 July 2018

Year	Won	Lost	Win %
1995	1	0	100%
1996	1	1	50.0%
1997	4	3	57.1%
1998	4	5	44.4%
1999	13	11	54.2%
2000	27	15	64.3%
2001	47	16	74.6%
2002	38	22	63.3%
2003	54	15	78.3%
2004	56	21	72.7%
2005	49	29	62.8%
2006	58	25	69.9%
2007	42	26	61.8%
2008	67	22	75.3%
2009	55	30	64.7%
2010	55	41	57.3%
2011	56	30	65.1%
2012	39	29	57.4%
2013	52	30	63.4%
2014	36	23	61.0%
2015	28	27	50.9%
2016	28	25	52.8%
2017	21	25	45.7%
2018	6	14	30.0%
Total	837	485	63.3%

- Note: 2012 and 2013 also include one game with no result.

== Titles and runners-up ==
As of 1 July 2018

Ranks #2 in total number of titles in China and #5 in total number of international titles.

Domestic
Title	Wins	Runners-up
Liguang Cup	1 (2001)	1 (2008)
Xinan Wang	1 (2003)	3 (2004, 2009, 2013)
CCTV Cup	1 (2004)	1 (2005)
Xinren Wang	2 (2001, 2005)	
Quzhou-Lanke Cup	1 (2008)	1 (2006)
Tianyuan	6 (2003–2008)	2 (2009–2010)
NEC Cup (China)	4 (2004, 2006, 2008–2009)	1 (2005)
Mingren	6 (2004–2009)	1 (2010)
National Sports Mass Meeting	2 (2002, 2010)	
Changqi Cup	2 (2007, 2011)	1 (2006)
Ahan Tongshan Cup	4 (2003, 2005, 2008, 2012)	
Longxing	1 (2008, 2014)	
Total	31	11
Continental
Title	Wins	Runners-up
China-Korea New Pro Wang	2 (2001, 2005)	
China-Korea Tengen	4 (2003–2005, 2007)	2 (2006, 2008)
World Mingren	1 (2010)	
China-Japan Longxing	1 (2010)	
China-Japan Agon Cup	4 (2004, 2006, 2009, 2013)	
Total	12	2
International
Title	Wins	Runners-up
Fujitsu Cup	1 (2008)	
World Oza	1 (2008)	
LG Cup	2 (2006, 2009)	
BC Card Cup	1 (2009)	1 (2011)
Samsung Cup	1 (2010)	2 (2011, 2012)
Mlily Cup		1 (2013)
Chunlan Cup	2 (2007, 2015)	
Total	8	4
Career Total
Total	51	17

== Head-to-head record vs selected players ==
As of 1 July 2018

Players who have won international Go titles in bold.

- (South Korea) **Lee Sedol** 24:24 +1 no result
- (China) **Kong Jie** 26:18
- (China) Hu Yaoyu 24:12
- (China) Liu Xing 21:13
- (China) **Zhou Ruiyang** 24:9
- (China) **Chang Hao** 20:11
- (China) **Chen Yaoye** 10:21 +1 no result
- (China) **Luo Xihe** 16:12
- (China) Qiu Jun 18:9
- (China) **Zhou Heyang** 15:12
- (China) Ding Wei 17:8
- (China) Xie He 14:11
- (China) **Shi Yue** 7:17
- (China) Gu Lingyi 13:10
- (China) **Piao Wenyao** 13:8
- (China) **Wang Xi** 12:9
- (South Korea) **Choi Cheolhan** 12:8
- (China) Li Zhe 12:7
- (China) Peng Quan 11:7
- (South Korea) **Lee Changho** 8:9
- (China) Huang Yizhong 9:6
- (China) Wang Yao 12:3
- (China) **Jiang Weijie** 7:7
- (China) Wang Lei 11:3
