= Choi Cheol-han =

South Korean Go player

Personal information
- Native name: 최철한 (Korean); 崔哲瀚 (Korean); Choe Cheolhan (Revised Romanization); Ch'oe Ch'ŏrhan (McCune–Reischauer)
- Full name: Choi Cheol-han
- Born: South Korea

Sport
- Turned pro: 1997
- Teacher: Kweon Kab-yong
- Rank: 9 dan
- Affiliation: Hanguk Kiwon

Choi Cheol-han
Medal record

Representing South Korea

Asian Games
Gold medal – first place	2010 Guangzhou	Men's Team
Bronze medal – third place	2010 Guangzhou	Mixed doubles

Choi Cheol-han (Korean: 최철한) is a South Korean professional Go player. He is the fourth youngest (12 years 2 months) to become a professional Go player in South Korean history behind Cho Hun-hyun (9 years 7 months), Lee Chang-ho (11 years 1 months) and Cho Hye-yeon (11 years 10 months). His nickname is "The Viper".

== Biography ==
Choi became a professional when he was 12 years old. He began playing Go at the age of seven, studying with Lee Sedol in Kweon Kab-yong's academy in Seoul. At that time, Choi was considered the next Lee Sedol.

== Promotion record ==
Rank	Year	Notes
1 dan	1997	
2 dan	1998	
3 dan	1999	
4 dan	2001	
5 dan	2002	
6 dan	2003	Won the 8th Chunwon against Won Seongjin.
7 dan	2004	Won the 47th Kuksu against Lee Changho.
8 dan	2004	Won the 15th Kisung against Lee Changho.
9 dan	2004	For his performance in the 2004 Korean Baduk League.

== Career Record ==
- 2006: 58 wins, 29 losses
- 2007: 45 wins, 25 losses
- 2008: 50 wins, 18 losses
- 2009: 56 wins, 18 losses
- 2010: 63 wins, 22 losses
- 2011: 50 wins, 24 losses

== Titles and Runners-up ==
As of 17 December 2017

Ranks tenth in total number of titles in Korea.

Domestic
Title	Wins	Runners-up
KT Cup		1 (2002)
Chunwon	4 (2003-2004, 2010-2011)	2 (2012-2013)
Kisung	1 (2004)	2 (2005, 2007)
Guksu	3 (2004-2005, 2011)	3 (2006, 2011-2012)
King of Kings		1 (2005)
GS Caltex Cup	1 (2005)	3 (2006, 2014-2015)
KBS Cup		1 (2006)
Maxim Cup	3 (2009-2010, 2015)	2 (2006, 2012)
Siptan	1 (2012)	
Myungin	1 (2013)	
Total	14	15
Continental
Title	Wins	Runners-up
China-Korea Tengen		3 (2004-2005, 2011)
Total	0	3
International
Title	Wins	Runners-up
Fujitsu Cup		1 (2005)
Zhonghuan Cup	1 (2005)	
Ing Cup	1 (2009)	1 (2005)
Total	2	2
Career Total
Total	16	20

=== Korean Baduk League ===
Season	Team	Place	Record
2007	Team World Meridian (Captain)	6th place	6–7
2008	Team No. 1 Fire Insurance	4th place	12–4
2009	Team Hite Jinro (Captain)	6th place	9–3
2010	Team Hite Jinro (Captain)	4th place	10–7
2011	Team Hite Jinro (Captain)	Runners-up	13–4

=== Chinese A League ===
Season	Team	Place	Record
2009	Team Sian (Captain)	7th place	9–3
2010	Team Sian (Captain)	2nd place	7–2
2011	Team Sian (Captain)	TBD	10–5

== Head-to-head record vs selected players ==
As of 10 June 2018

Players who have won international go titles in bold.

- (South Korea) **Lee Changho** 31:30
- (South Korea) **Lee Sedol** 20:32
- (South Korea) **Park Yeonghun** 19:22
- (South Korea) **Won Seongjin** 18:11
- (South Korea) Mok Jinseok 18:8
- (South Korea) **Kang Dongyun** 12:11
- (South Korea) **Kim Jiseok** 11:12
- (China) **Chen Yaoye** 9:11
- (South Korea) Cho Hanseung 9:11
- (China) **Gu Li** 8:12
- (South Korea) **Park Junghwan** 6:12
- (South Korea) An Choyoung 11:5
- (South Korea) **Cho Hunhyun** 12:2
- (South Korea) Heo Youngho 10:4
- (South Korea) Lee Younggu 9:5
- (China) **Chang Hao** 6:7
- (China) **Shi Yue** 6:7
- (South Korea) **Yoo Changhyuk** 8:4
- (China) **Kong Jie** 7:5
- (China) **Mi Yuting** 5:7
- (South Korea) Hong Seongji 8:3
- (South Korea) Yun Junsang 8:3
- (China) **Zhou Ruiyang** 8:3
- (China) Peng Quan 7:4
