= Seo Bong-soo =

South Korean Go player

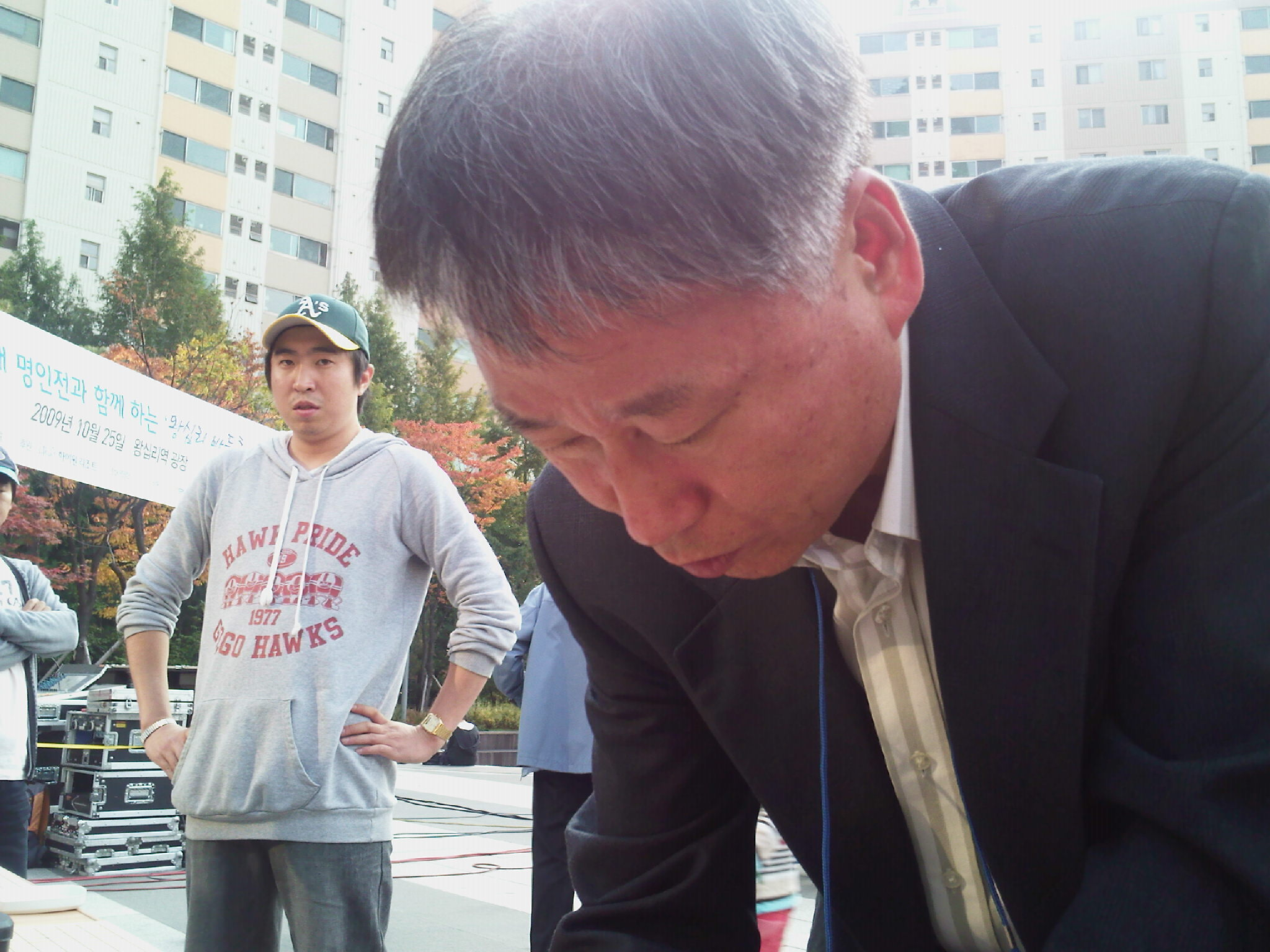

Personal information
- Native name: 서봉수 (Korean); 徐奉洙 (Korean); Seo Bongsu (Revised Romanization); Sŏ Pongsu (McCune–Reischauer)
- Born: February 1, 1953 (age 73) Daedeok-gu, Daejeon, South Korea

Sport
- Turned pro: 1970
- Rank: 9 dan
- Affiliation: Hanguk Kiwon

Seo Bong-soo (Korean: 서봉수; born February 1, 1953) is a professional Go player.

== Biography ==
Seo Bong-soo turned professional in 1970. By 1986 he became the 4th ever Korean 9 dan. He was Cho Hunhyun's biggest rival in the 1980s and frequently challenged Cho in major title events. During their career, Seo and Cho played against each other in more than 350 official games, which is a world record. He was a part of the "Gang of Four" of Korean Go in 1990s, the rest being Cho Hunhyun, Lee Chang-ho, and Yoo Changhyuk. He made an amazing run of wins in 1997 during the 5th SBS Cup. He played as fourth captain for Korea, and singlehandedly beat the entire Chinese team as well as what was left of the Japanese team—a winning streak of 9 straight games.

== Titles ==
Ranks #6-t in total number of titles in Korea.

| Title | Years Held |
|---|---|
| Current | 5 |
| (South Korea) Wangwi | 1975, 1980 |
| (South Korea) Guksu | 1986, 1987 |
| (South Korea) KBS Baduk Wang | 1983 |
| Defunct | 16 |
| (South Korea) LG Refined Oil Cup | 1999 |
| (South Korea) Tong Yang Cup | 1991 |
| (South Korea) Chaegowi | 1980 |
| (South Korea) Gukgi | 1980, 1988, 1992 |
| (South Korea) Kiwang | 1983, 1988 |
| (South Korea) Myungin | 1971–1974, 1976, 1978, 1983 |
| International | 1 |
| (China) (South Korea) (Japan) (Taiwan) Ing Cup | 1992 |
