= Asian TV Cup =

Go competition

- Full name: Asian TV Cup
- Started: 1989
- Sponsors: NHK; KBS; CCTV

The Asian TV Cup is a Go competition.

== Outline ==
The Asian TV Cup is the oldest continental tournament, dating back to 1989. The winners and runner ups of the biggest hayago competitions from Asia (Japan: NHK Cup, Korea: KBS Cup, China: CCTV Cup) battle in the biggest hayago tournament of all.

== Past winners and runners-up ==
No.	Year	Winner	Runner-up
1	1989	(Japan) Takemiya Masaki	(Japan) Kobayashi Satoru
2	1990	(Japan) Takemiya Masaki	(South Korea) Lee Chang-ho
3	1991	(Japan) Takemiya Masaki	(China) Cao Dayuan
4	1992	(Japan) Takemiya Masaki	(South Korea) Cho Hun-hyun
5	1993	(Japan) Yoda Norimoto	(South Korea) Seo Bong-soo
6	1994	(Japan) Ōtake Hideo	(China) Qian Yuping
7	1995	(South Korea) Lee Chang-ho	(South Korea) Cho Hun-hyun
8	1996	(South Korea) Lee Chang-ho	(South Korea) Yoo Chang-hyuk
9	1997	(China) Yu Bin	(Japan) Ō Rissei
10	1998	(Japan) Yoda Norimoto	(China) Ma Xiaochun
11	1999	(Japan) Yoda Norimoto	(South Korea) Lee Changho
12	2000	(South Korea) Cho Hun-hyun	(South Korea) Lee Changho
13	2001	(South Korea) Cho Hun-hyun	(South Korea) Mok Jin-seok
14	2002	(South Korea) Lee Chang-ho	(South Korea) Cho Hun-hyun
15	2003	(China) Zhou Heyang	(Japan) Mimura Tomoyasu
16	2004	(China) Yu Bin	(South Korea) Song Tae-kon
17	2005	(Japan) Cho U	(South Korea) Cho Han-seung
18	2006	(China) Wang Xi	(South Korea) Lee Changho
19	2007	(South Korea) Lee Sedol	(China) Chen Yaoye
20	2008	(South Korea) Lee Sedol	(South Korea) Cho Han-seung
21	2009	(China) Kong Jie	(South Korea) Lee Sedol
22	2010	(China) Kong Jie	(Japan) Yuki Satoshi
23	2011	(China) Kong Jie	(South Korea) Paek Hong-suk
24	2012	(South Korea) Paek Hong-suk	(China) Kong Jie
25	2013	(Japan) Iyama Yuta	(South Korea) Park Junghwan
26	2014	(South Korea) Lee Sedol	(Japan) Kono Rin
27	2015	(South Korea) Lee Sedol	(South Korea) Park Junghwan
28	2016	(China) Li Qincheng	(South Korea) Shin Jinseo
29	2017	(South Korea) Na Hyeon	(South Korea) Lee Sedol
30	2018	(South Korea) Kim Ji-seok	(South Korea) Na Hyeon
31	2019	(South Korea) Shin Jinseo	(China) Ding Hao

== See also ==
- Asian TV Cup at Go News
- Asian TV Cup at the Nihon Ki-in website (in Japanese)
