= BC Card Cup =

BC Card Cup may refer to:

- BC Card Cup (Korea's national championship), Go competition in South Korea
- BC Card Cup World Baduk Championship, international Go competition
