= BC Card Cup World Baduk Championship =

- Full name: BC Card Cup World Baduk Championship
- Started: 2009
- Sponsors: BC Card
- Prize money: 300,000,000 Won ($268,000)
- Affiliation: Hanguk Kiwon

BC Card Cup World Baduk Championship was an international Go competition sponsored by South Korea's BC Card. The precursor to this tournament was South Korea's BC Card Cup. The BC Card Cup World Baduk Championship was an annual competition, and was first held in 2009. The tournament was discontinued after four editions.

== Player selection ==
The players were picked as follows:

- 3 players from South Korea
- 2 players from China
- 2 players from Japan
- 1 player from Chinese Taipei
- 2 wild-card players named by Hanguk Kiwon
- 54 preliminary tournament winners

== Format ==
The format was a single knockout with 6.5 points' komi. The time limit was 2 hour thinking time (from 2010), and the winner's purse was 300,000,000 Won ($268,000). In 2010 Gu Li was the defending champion, but lost in the round of 16 to An Choyoung by half a point with black, while leading in territory throughout the entire match. Lee Sedol and Chang Hao were the 2010 finalists. Lee held a 2–0 lead heading to the break on 26 April. The match resumed on the 27th. Lee was the victor, to win his 11th World Championship, and also his 23rd consecutive win after coming out of retirement. Chang had been seeking his fourth World Championship.

The 2012 Championship featured 2 Dark Horse Finalists. Whilst The first finalist Dang Yifei was able to take out very tough competition throughout the latter stages of the competition, building on momentum that he gained by defeating Defending Champion Lee Sedol in the Round of 32, the second finalist and eventual champion Paek Hongsuk had a much more difficult path, having remained as one of the few remaining Korean players in the Round of 16, and the only player after the Quarterfinals, after Pak Yeong-hun was defeated by Dang Yifei. A couple of close 1.5 point wins against tough Chinese opposition, and then playing a semi-final that was labelled as "a crafty fox", forcing Hu Yaoyu, who was on the last remaining 1-minute Byoyomi, to look for attacking moves on a seemingly safe dragon of White's. The game seemed very tame, and was definitely heading towards an endgame where there was a lot of "hidden" territory for both sides.

The Final was played from 12 May to the 16th, and for the 2nd time in Four Championships, the Champion won by the fourth game. Paek Hongsuk was able to Snap Dang Yifei's 19 game International win-streak, and then win 2 more games with both the black stones and white stones respectively to win the Championship.

== Past winners and runners-up ==
Year	Winner	Score	Runner-up
2009	(China) Gu Li	3–1	(South Korea) Cho Hanseung
2010	(South Korea) Lee Sedol	3–0	(China) Chang Hao
2011	(South Korea) Lee Sedol	3–2	(China) Gu Li
2012	(South Korea) Paek Hongsuk	3–1	(China) Dang Yifei
