= Myeongin =

South Korean Go competition

The Myeongin (Korean: 명인전, Hanja: 名人戰) is a Go competition in South Korea. The word myeongin in Korean language, literally meaning "Brilliant Man", is same as meijin in Japanese and as mingren in Chinese. The Myeongin is the Hanguk Kiwon equivalent to the Nihon-Kiin's Meijin title. The tournament was defunct from 2004-2006.

The tournament was discontinued again in 2016 after the 43rd tournament, but was revived in 2021 with the SG Group as the new sponsor.

== Outline ==
The Myeongin was formerly sponsored by the Kangwon Land Corporation.

The winner's prize is 70,000,000 won and the runner-up's prize is 25,000,000 won, as of 2025. The format is double elimination. The sponsor is the SG Group, with the Hankook Ilbo newspaper and Korea Baduk Association as co-hosts.

== Past winners and runners-up ==
	Year	Winner	Score	Runner-up
1	1968	Cho Namchul	1–0	Kim In
2	1969	Kim In	3–1	Cho Namchul
3	1970	Cho Namchul	3–1	Kim In
4	1971	Seo Bongsoo	3–1	Cho Namchul
5	1972	Seo Bongsoo	3–0	Jeong Chang-hyun
6	1973	Seo Bongsoo	3–1	Cho Hunhyun
7	1974	Seo Bongsoo	3–0	Cho Namchul
8	1976	Seo Bongsoo	3–2	Yun Kihyun
9	1977	Cho Hunhyun	3–1	Seo Bongsoo
10	1978	Seo Bongsoo	3–1	Cho Hunhyun
11	1979	Cho Hunhyun	3–2	Seo Bongsoo
12	1980	Cho Hunhyun	3–1	Seo Bongsoo
13	1981	Cho Hunhyun	3–1	Seo Bongsoo
14	1983	Seo Bongsoo	3–2	Cho Hunhyun
15	1984	Cho Hunhyun	3–1	Seo Bongsoo
16	1985	Cho Hunhyun	3–0	Kim Su-chang
17	1986	Cho Hunhyun	3–1	Seo Bongsoo
18	1987	Cho Hunhyun	3–0	Chang Tu-chin
19	1988	Cho Hunhyun	3–0	Seo Bongsoo
20	1989	Cho Hunhyun	3–0	Seo Bongsoo
21	1990	Cho Hunhyun	3–1	Lee Chang-ho
22	1991	Lee Chang-ho	3–0	Cho Hunhyun
23	1992	Lee Chang-ho	3–1	Yang Chae-ho
24	1993	Lee Chang-ho	3–2	Yoo Changhyuk
25	1994	Lee Chang-ho	3–0	Im Seon-keun
26	1995	Lee Chang-ho	3–0	Yang Chae-ho
27	1996	Lee Chang-ho	3–1	Choi Myung-hoon
28	1997	Cho Hunhyun	3–2	Lee Chang-ho
29	1998	Lee Chang-ho	3–1	Cho Hunhyun
30	1999	Lee Chang-ho	3–1	Choi Myung-hoon
31	2000	Lee Chang-ho	3–0	Cho Hunhyun
32	2001	Lee Chang-ho	3–2	Yoo Changhyuk
33	2002	Lee Chang-ho	3–0	An Choyoung
34	2003	Lee Chang-ho	3–2	Cho Hunhyun
35	2007	Lee Sedol	3–0	Cho Hanseung
36	2008	Lee Sedol	3–0	Kang Dongyun
37	2009	Lee Chang-ho	3–1	Won Seong-jin
38	2010	Park Yeong-hun	3–2	Won Seong-jin
39	2011	Park Yeong-hun	3–1	Paek Hong-suk
40	2012	Lee Sedol	3–2	Paek Hong-suk
41	2013	Choi Cheol-han	3–2	Lee Sedol
42	2014	Park Yeong-hun	3–1	Lee Dong-hoon
43	2015	Lee Sedol	3–1	Park Jung-hwan
44	2021	Shin Jin-seo	2–1	Byun Sang-il
45	2022	Shin Min-jun	2–0	Shin Jin-seo
46	2023	Shin Jin-seo	2–0	Byun Sang-il
47	2024	Park Junghwan	2–0	Lee Ji-hyun
8	2025	Shin Jin-seo	2–0	Park Junghwan

== See also ==
- Meijin
- Mingren
