= GS Caltex Cup =

South Korean Go competition

The GS Caltex Cup (Korean: GS칼텍스배 바둑기전) is a Go competition.

== Outline ==
The GS Caltex Cup replaced the LG Refined Oil Cup. It is organized by the Maeil Business Newspaper, Maeil Broadcasting Network (MBN), and Korea Baduk Association, and sponsored by GS Caltex. The winner receives 70 million won in prize money, and the runner-up receives 30 million won (as of 2025). The final is a best-of-5. Komi is 6.5 points.

Players begin with 30 minutes of thinking time on their clock and add a 30 second increment per move (Fischer time). The time increment system was introduced in 2024, replacing the byoyomi system.

== Past winners and runners-up ==
	Year	Winner	Score	Runner-up
1	1996	Yoo Changhyuk	3–2	Cho Hunhyun
2	1997	Lee Changho	3–0	Choi Myung-hoon
3	1998	Lee Changho	3–0	Choi Myung-hoon
4	1999	Seo Bongsoo	3–2	Yoo Changhyuk
5	2000	Choi Myunghoon	3–1	Rui Naiwei
6	2001	Lee Changho	3–0	Choi Myunghoon
7	2002	Lee Sedol	3–1	Choi Myunghoon
8	2003	Lee Changho	3–0	Cho Hanseung
9	2004	Lee Changho	3–0	Park Yeonghun
10	2005	Choi Cheol-han	3–2	Lee Changho
11	2006	Lee Sedol	3–0	Choi Cheol-han
12	2007	Park Yeonghun	3–2	Lee Sedol
13	2008	Park Yeonghun	3–0	Won Seongjin
14	2009	Cho Hanseung	3–1	Park Yeonghun
15	2010	Won Seong-jin	3–1	Cho Hanseung
16	2011	Park Junghwan	3–0	Park Yeonghun
17	2012	Lee Sedol	3–2	Park Yeonghun
18	2013	Kim Jiseok	3–0	Lee Sedol
19	2014	Kim Jiseok	3–0	Choi Cheol-han
20	2015	Mok Jinseok	3–1	Choi Cheol-han
21	2016	Lee Donghoon	3–0	Yun Chanhee
22	2017	Ahn Kukhyun	3–2	Kim Jiseok
23	2018	Shin Jinseo	3–2	Lee Sedol
24	2019	Shin Jinseo	3–0	Kim Jiseok
25	2020	Shin Jinseo	3–0	Kim Jiseok
26	2021	Shin Jinseo	3–2	Byun Sangil
27	2022	Shin Jinseo	3–0	Byun Sangil
28	2023	Byun Sangil	3–0	Choi Jeong
29	2024	Shin Min-jun	3–0	Park Sang-jin
30	2025	Shin Jin-seo	3–0	An Seong-jun
31	2026	Shin Min-jun	3–0	Park Junghwan
