= Chunlan Cup =

International Go competition

The Chunlan Cup, officially the Chunlan Cup World Professional Weiqi Championship (Chinese: 春兰杯世界职业围棋锦标赛), is an international Go competition.

== Outline ==
The Chunlan Cup is an international Go tournament sponsored and hosted by the Chunlan Group of China. 24 players are chosen as follows:

- 3 top players of last tournament
- 8 from China
- 5 from Japan
- 4 from South Korea
- 2 from Chinese Taipei
- 1 from North America
- 1 from Europe

The 24 players are reduced to 16 after the first round. The top 8 players are qualified for the next round while the bottom 8 play each other in a knockout tournament.

Each player has 2 hours and 30 minutes of time with five 60-second byoyomi periods, since the 12th cup. (Formerly, the time limit was 3 hours with five 60-second byoyomi periods.) The komi is 7.5 points. The winner's prize is US$150,000.

== Past winners and runners-up ==
Edition	Year	Winner	Score	Runner-up
1st	1998–1999	(South Korea) Cho Hunhyun	2–1	(South Korea) Lee Chang-ho
2nd	1999–2000	(Japan) O Rissei	2–1	(China) Ma Xiaochun
3rd	2000–2001	(South Korea) Yoo Changhyuk	2–1	(Japan) O Rissei
4th	2002–2003	(South Korea) Lee Chang-ho	2–0	(Japan) Hane Naoki
5th	2003–2005	(South Korea) Lee Chang-ho	2–1	(China) Zhou Heyang
6th	2006–2007	(China) Gu Li	2–0	(China) Chang Hao
7th	2008–2009	(China) Chang Hao	2–0	(South Korea) Lee Chang-ho
8th	2010–2011	(South Korea) Lee Sedol	2–1	(China) Xie He
9th	2012–2013	(China) Chen Yaoye	2–1	(South Korea) Lee Sedol
10th	2014–2015	(China) Gu Li	2–0	(China) Zhou Ruiyang
11th	2016–2017	(China) Tan Xiao	2–1	(South Korea) Park Yeong-hun
12th	2018–2019	(South Korea) Park Junghwan	2–0	(South Korea) Park Yeong-hun
13th	2020–2021	(South Korea) Shin Jin-seo	2–0	(China) Tang Weixing
14th	2022–2023	(South Korea) Byun Sang-il	2–0	(China) Li Xuanhao
15th	2024–2025	(China) Yang Kaiwen	2–1	(South Korea) Park Junghwan

=== By nation ===
Nation	Winners	Runners-up
South Korea	8	6
China	6	7
Japan	1	2
