= Samsung Fire Cup =

International Go tournament

- Full name: Samsung Fire & Marine Insurance World Masters Baduk
- Started: 1996
- Sponsors: Samsung Fire & Marine Insurance
- Prize money: 300,000,000 Won

The Samsung Fire Cup (Korean: 삼성화재배, Hanja: 三星火災杯) is an international Go competition.

== Outline ==
The Samsung Cup is an international Go competition. The official name is The Samsung Fire & Marine Insurance World Masters Baduk. The Samsung Fire & Marine Insurance of South Korea (which is a branch of the Samsung Group) and Hanguk Kiwon host the competition. The format starts with a preliminary tournament in which even amateur players are allowed to play. After the preliminaries, 16 players who advance plus the last four players of the previous year make up the main event. The semi-finals have a best-of-3 format, while the final has a best-of-3 match.

Before 2020 the tournament starts off with the preliminaries, and then it is followed by splitting the players into 8 groups, with 4 players in each. There are three rounds, which are used to determine the 16 players that will be in the main tournament. The players must win two of their matches in order to advance to the round of 16. If there is someone with one win and one loss, they will play each other to see who can gain the second win. Obviously the people with two losses, whether they have a win or not, will be eliminated from the tournament.

== Past winners and runners-up ==
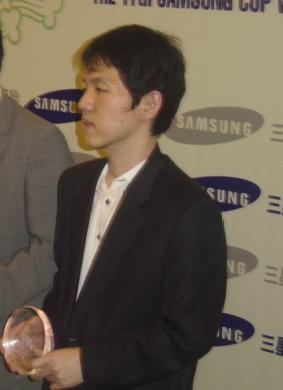
Lee Chang-ho receiving the 11th Samsung Fire Cup Runner-up trophy

Edition	Year	Nat.	Winner	Score	Nat.	Runner-up
1st	1996	(Japan)	Yoda Norimoto	2–1	(South Korea)	Yoo Chang-hyuk
2nd	1997	(South Korea)	Lee Chang-ho	3–0	(Japan)	Kobayashi Satoru
3rd	1998-1999	(South Korea)	Lee Chang-ho	3–2	(China)	Ma Xiaochun
4th	1999	(South Korea)	Lee Chang-ho	3–0	(Japan)	Cho Son-jin
5th	2000	(South Korea)	Yoo Chang-hyuk	3–1	(Japan)	Yamada Kimio
6th	2001	(South Korea)	Cho Hun-hyun	2–1	(China)	Chang Hao
7th	2002-2003	(South Korea)	Cho Hun-hyun	2–0	(China)	Wang Lei
8th	2003	(Japan)	Cho Chikun	2–1	(South Korea)	Pak Yeong-hun
9th	2004	(South Korea)	Lee Se-dol	2–0	(China)	Wang Xi
10th	2005-2006	(China)	Luo Xihe	2–1	(South Korea)	Lee Chang-ho
11th	2006-2007	(China)	Chang Hao	2–0	(South Korea)	Lee Chang-ho
12th	2007-2008	(South Korea)	Lee Se-dol	2–1	(South Korea)	Pak Yeong-hun
13th	2008-2009	(South Korea)	Lee Se-dol	2–0	(China)	Kong Jie
14th	2009	(China)	Kong Jie	2–0	(China)	Qiu Jun
15th	2010	(China)	Gu Li	2–1	(South Korea)	Heo Yeong-ho
16th	2011	(South Korea)	Won Seong-jin	2–1	(China)	Gu Li
17th	2012	(South Korea)	Lee Se-dol	2–1	(China)	Gu Li
18th	2013	(China)	Tang Weixing	2–0	(South Korea)	Lee Se-dol
19th	2014	(South Korea)	Kim Ji-seok	2–0	(China)	Tang Weixing
20th	2015	(China)	Ke Jie	2–0	(China)	Shi Yue
21st	2016	(China)	Ke Jie	2–1	(China)	Tuo Jiaxi
22nd	2017	(China)	Gu Zihao	2–1	(China)	Tang Weixing
23rd	2018	(China)	Ke Jie	2–1	(South Korea)	An Kukhyun
24th	2019	(China)	Tang Weixing	2–1	(China)	Yang Dingxin
25th	2020	(China)	Ke Jie	2–0	(South Korea)	Shin Jin-seo
26th	2021	(South Korea)	Park Junghwan	2–1	(South Korea)	Shin Jin-seo
27th	2022	(South Korea)	Shin Jin-seo	2–0	(South Korea)	Choi Jeong
28th	2023	(China)	Ding Hao	2–1	(China)	Xie Erhao
29th	2024	(China)	Ding Hao	2–1	(China)	Dang Yifei
30th	2025	(China)	Liao Yuanhe	2–0	(China)	Ding Hao
31th	2026	(South Korea)	Byun Sang-il	2–1	(China)	Li Qincheng

=== By nation ===
Nation	Winners	Runners-up
South Korea	15	11
China	14	17
Japan	2	3

== See also ==
- Samsung Fire & Marine Insurance
