= Wangwi =

South Korean Go competition

The Wangwi was a Go competition in South Korea.

== Outline ==
The Wangwi was a Go competition used by the Hanguk Kiwon. It is sponsored by the Chung-ang Il-po. The komi for white is 6.5 points. The preliminary matches get 4 hours of thinking time, while the final match gets 5 hours. The winner's purse was 45,000,000 SKW (US$40,000). It ran from 1966-2008.

== Past winners ==
Player	Years Held
Kim In	1966 - 1972, 1974
Ha Chanseok	1973
Seo Bongsoo	1975, 1980
Cho Hun-hyeon	1976 - 1989
Lee Chang-ho	1990, 1995 - 2007
Yoo Changhyuk	1991 - 1994

== See also ==
- Oza
- Wangjia
