= World Mingren =

The World Mingren is an invitational Go competition consisting of one player each from China, Japan, and South Korea.

== Outline ==
The tournament consists of three players. One of the three players is given a bye. The remaining two players play a match, with the winner progressing to the final. The loser of the first match plays the player with the bye, with the winner of this match progressing to the final. The winner of the first match then plays the winner of the second match to decide the winner of the title.

Gu Li, representing China, was the winner of the first edition, defeating Lee Chang-ho in the final.

== Past winners and runners-up ==
Year	Nat.	Winner	Nat.	Runner-up	Nat.	Third place
2010	(China)	Gu Li	(South Korea)	Lee Changho	(Japan)	Iyama Yuta
2011	(South Korea)	Park Yeonghun	(China)	Jiang Weijie	(Japan)	Iyama Yuta
2012	(China)	Jiang Weijie	(South Korea)	Park Yeonghun	(Japan)	Keigo Yamashita
2015	(China)	Chen Yaoye	(Japan)	Iyama Yuta	(South Korea)	Park Yeonghun
2018	(South Korea)	Lee Sedol	(China)	Lian Xiao	(Japan)	Iyama Yuta
