= Song Tae-kon =

South Korean Go player

Personal information
- Native name: 송태곤 (Korean); 宋泰坤 (Korean); Song Taegon (Revised Romanization); Song T'aegon (McCune–Reischauer)
- Full name: Song Tae-kon
- Born: September 8, 1986 (age 39) Seoul, South Korea

Sport
- Turned pro: 1999
- Rank: 9 dan
- Affiliation: Hanguk Kiwon

Song Tae-kon (born September 8, 1986) is a Korean professional Go player.

== Biography ==
Song Tae-kon started learning Go when he was 6. He turned pro when he was 13. He is one of the best young players in South Korea. His biggest moment came in 2003 when he reached the final of Fujitsu Cup losing to Lee Sedol. Became a 4 dan in 2003 after winning the Chunwon title. Song was promoted to 5 dan in 2003 for having been runner up in the Fujitsu Cup. He was promoted to 6 dan after winning the KBS Cup, and then promoted to his current rank of 7 dan for winning the BC Card Cup. All of this happened in 2003.

== Titles & runners-up ==
Ranks No. 10 in total number of titles in Korea.

Title	Years Held
Current	5
(South Korea) KBS Baduk Wang	2003
(South Korea) Chunwon	2002
(South Korea) BC Card Cup	2003
(South Korea) New Pro Strongest	2002, 2003
Total	5

Title	Years Lost
Continental	3
(Japan) (South Korea) (China) (Taiwan) Asian TV Cup	2004
(South Korea) China-Korea New Pro Wang	2003
(South Korea) China-Korea Tengen	2003
International	1
(Japan) (South Korea) (China) (Taiwan) (Europe) (United States) Fujitsu Cup	2003
Total	4

== Notable games ==
In a 2008 game Song Tae-kon, playing as White, played a famous, but exploitable strategy, Mirror Go. He did this until the 42nd move against Piao Wenyao. Wenyao won the game.
