= Go at the 2010 Asian Games =

- Venue: Guangzhou Chess Institute
- Dates: 20–26 November 2010
- Competitors: 77 from 10 nations

A Weiqi tournament was held at the 2010 Asian Games in Guangzhou for the first time at an Asiad. The three events in the competition - men's team, women's team and mixed doubles — were held between 20 and 26 November 2010 at the Guangzhou Chess Institute.

Competitors from China, Hong Kong, Japan, South Korea, North Korea, Malaysia, Mongolia, Chinese Taipei, Thailand and Vietnam were taking part in Weiqi across the three events, although not all nations had competitors in each.

== Schedule ==
●	Round	S	Semifinals	F	Finals

Event↓/Date →	20th Sat	21st Sun	22nd Mon		23rd Tue	24th Wed	25th Thu	26th Fri	
Men's team					●●	●●	●●	●	F
Women's team					●●	●●	●●	●	F
Mixed pair	●●●	●●●	S	F					

== Medalists ==
Event	Gold	Silver	Bronze
Men's team	South Korea; Lee Chang-ho; Kang Dong-yun; Lee Se-dol; Cho Han-seung; Park Jeong-hwan; Choi Cheol-han	China; Chang Hao; Gu Li; Liu Xing; Kong Jie; Xie He; Zhou Ruiyang	Japan; Keigo Yamashita; Yuta Iyama; Shinji Takao; Satoshi Yuki; Kimio Yamada; Jiro Akiyama
Women's team	South Korea; Lee Min-jin; Kim Yoon-yeong; Cho Hye-yeon; Lee Seul-a	China; Wang Chenxing; Rui Naiwei; Song Ronghui; Tang Yi	Chinese Taipei; Hsieh Yi-min; Joanne Missingham; Chang Cheng-ping; Wang Jing-yi
Mixed pair	South Korea; Park Jeong-hwan; Lee Seul-a	China; Xie He; Song Ronghui	South Korea; Choi Cheol-han; Kim Yoon-yeong

== Medal table ==
Rank	Nation	Gold	Silver	Bronze	Total
1	South Korea (KOR)	3	0	1	4
2	China (CHN)	0	3	0	3
3	Chinese Taipei (TPE)	0	0	1	1
3	Japan (JPN)	0	0	1	1
Totals (4 entries)		3	3	3	9

== Participating nations ==
A total of 77 athletes from 10 nations competed in go at the 2010 Asian Games:

- China (10)
- Chinese Taipei (10)
- Hong Kong (4)
- Japan (10)
- Malaysia (10)
- Mongolia (2)
- North Korea (5)
- South Korea (10)
- Thailand (10)
- Vietnam (6)
