= LG Cup (Go) =

International Go competition

- Full name: LG Cup World Baduk Championship
- Started: 1996; 30 years ago
- Sponsors: LG
- Prize money: 300,000,000 Won ($212,000)

LG Cup World Baduk Championship (Korean: LG배 세계기왕전, Hanja: LG杯 世界棋王戰) is a Go competition.

== Outline ==
The LG Cup is organized by the Chosun Ilbo newspaper and sponsored by the LG Group of Korea. The LG Cup was created after the Kiwang (기왕; 棋王) title from Korea was abolished. There are 16 players who compete in a preliminary, and another 16 players are invited. The latest edition had 256 competitors in the preliminary, the biggest in history. The players are invited from the following Weiqi/Go/Baduk associations.

- 2 from the holder and runner-up of the previous year.
- 6 from South Korea
- 3 from Japan
- 3 from China
- 1 from Chinese Taipei
- 1 wildcard

The final is a best-of-three match. The komi is 6.5 points, and each player has 3 hours main time and five 40-second byoyomi periods. The winner's purse is 300,000,000 won and the total prize pool is 1.3 billion won.

== Winners & runners-up ==
Edition	Years	Winner	Score	Runner-up
1st	1996–1997	(South Korea) Lee Changho	3–0	(South Korea) Yoo Changhyuk
2nd	1997–1998	(Japan) O Rissei	3–2	(South Korea) Yoo Changhyuk
3rd	1998–1999	(South Korea) Lee Changho	3–0	(China) Ma Xiaochun
4th	1999–2000	(China) Yu Bin	3–1	(South Korea) Yoo Changhyuk
5th	2000–2001	(South Korea) Lee Changho	3–2	(South Korea) Lee Sedol
6th	2001–2002	(South Korea) Yoo Changhyuk	3–2	(South Korea) Cho Hunhyun
7th	2002–2003	(South Korea) Lee Sedol	3–1	(South Korea) Lee Changho
8th	2003–2004	(South Korea) Lee Changho	3–1	(South Korea) Mok Jinseok
9th	2004–2005	(Japan) Cho U	3–1	(China) Yu Bin
10th	2005–2006	(China) Gu Li	3–2	(China) Chen Yaoye
11th	2006–2007	(Chinese Taipei) Chou Chun-hsun	2–1	(China) Hu Yaoyu
12th	2007–2008	(South Korea) Lee Sedol	2–1	(South Korea) Han Sang-hoon
13th	2008–2009	(China) Gu Li	2–0	(South Korea) Lee Sedol
14th	2009–2010	(China) Kong Jie	2–0	(South Korea) Lee Changho
15th	2010–2011	(China) Piao Wenyao	2–0	(China) Kong Jie
16th	2011–2012	(China) Jiang Weijie	2–0	(South Korea) Lee Changho
17th	2012–2013	(China) Shi Yue	2–0	(South Korea) Won Seongjin
18th	2013–2014	(China) Tuo Jiaxi	2–1	(China) Zhou Ruiyang
19th	2014–2015	(South Korea) Park Junghwan	2–1	(South Korea) Kim Jiseok
20th	2015–2016	(South Korea) Kang Dong-yun	2–1	(South Korea) Park Yeonghun
21st	2016–2017	(China) Dang Yifei	2–0	(China) Zhou Ruiyang
22nd	2017–2018	(China) Xie Erhao	2–1	(Japan) Iyama Yuta
23rd	2018–2019	(China) Yang Dingxin	2–1	(China) Shi Yue
24th	2019–2020	(South Korea) Shin Jin-seo	2–0	(South Korea) Park Junghwan
25th	2020–2021	(South Korea) Shin Min-jun	2–1	(China) Ke Jie
26th	2021–2022	(South Korea) Shin Jin-seo	2–0	(China) Yang Dingxin
27th	2022–2023	(China) Ding Hao	2–0	(China) Yang Dingxin
28th	2023–2024	(South Korea) Shin Jin-seo	2–0	(South Korea) Byun Sang-il
29th	2024–2025	(South Korea) Byun Sang-il	2–1 (Note: Byun Sang-il was awarded two wins because of a penalty against Ke Jie in game 2 and because Ke Jie forfeited in game 3 after a dispute with the referee. The Chinese Weiqi Association did not accept the result of the third game. See § 29th LG Cup (2024–2025).) (Note: 29th LG Cup World Baduk Championship final controversy)	(China) Ke Jie
30th	2025–2026	(South Korea) Shin Min-jun	2–1	(Japan) Ichiriki Ryo
31st	2026	(China) Wang Xinghao	2–1	(South Korea) Shin Min-jun

=== By nation ===
Nation	Winners	Runners-up
South Korea	15	17
China	13	12
Japan	2	2
Chinese Taipei	1	0

== 29th LG Cup (2024–2025) ==
In the 29th LG Cup, Byun Sang-il won the best-of-three final after his opponent Ke Jie was disqualified in game 2 for rule violations and forfeited in game 3 after a dispute over another similar rule violation. Both the losses by penalty and forfeit were unprecedented in Go world championship finals. The rule, adopted by the Korea Baduk Association in November 2024, required players to place captured stones on the bowl lid, to keep track of them as an aid to counting the score. Reflecting differences in scoring systems, there is no such rule in China, where players may be accustomed to setting captured stones aside anywhere near the board or putting the stones back into their opponent's bowl.

During the second game of the LG Cup final, Ke Jie violated the rule twice. The first violation resulted in a two-point penalty and a warning. Later in the game, Ke Jie again did not place a captured stone on the bowl lid, prompting an objection from Byun Sang-il. By rule, Ke Jie was penalized for the second violation with an immediate loss.

In the third game the next day, Ke Jie once again failed to place two captured stones on the bowl lid after capturing them. Ke Jie and the Chinese side objected to timing of the referee's intervention, because the referee paused the game several moves later, during Byun's turn, without requiring him to decide his next move before the pause. Ke Jie considered it unfair to resume the game after the pause had given Byun extra thinking time. Rather than resuming the game with a two-point penalty, Ke Jie asked for a rematch. No agreement was reached after two hours, and Ke Jie left the venue, resulting in a loss by default. The Chinese Weiqi Association released a statement saying that they did not accept the outcome of the third game. Byun Sang-il said he felt uncomfortable with the result and understood Ke Jie's position. The Korea Baduk Association issued an apology for the incident.
