= Yongda Cup =

The Yongda Cup (Chinese: 永达杯) is a Zhongguo Qiyuan Go competition.

== Outline ==
The Yongda Cup is sponsored by the Zhongguo Qiyuan and China Yongda Automobiles Services Holdings Limited 16 players participate in a single knockout, and the final is a best-of-3. The komi is 6.5 points. The time limit is 2 hours. The winner's purse is 100,000 RMB.

== Past winners ==
Player	Years Held
Chang Hao	2002
Hu Yaoyu	2004
