= Fujitsu Cup =

The Fujitsu Cup (富士通杯) was an international Go competition that ran from 1988 to 2011.

== Outline ==
The Fujitsu Cup was an international Go competition hosted by Fujitsu and Yomiuri Shimbun. The players were selected as follows:

- The top 3 players from the previous year's competition
- 7 players from Japan
- 5 players from China
- 5 players from South Korea
- 1 player from Taiwan
- 1 player from North America
- 1 player from South America
- 1 player from Europe

All 24 players played through preliminaries, until 8 players with the best record were given automatic advancement to the second round. The other 16 played against each other in the first round. The format was a single knockout, with 5.5 komi until 2002, 6.5 komi from 2003. The time limit was 3 hours' thinking time, and the winner's purse was ¥15,000,000 (≈$142,000).

In December 2011, the Japanese Go Association announced the permanent closure of the tournament.

== Past winners and runners-up ==
Edition	Year	Nat.	Winner	Nat.	Runner-up
1	1988	(Japan)	Takemiya Masaki	(Japan)	Rin Kaiho
2	1989	(Japan)	Takemiya Masaki	(Japan)	Rin Kaiho
3	1990	(Japan)	Rin Kaiho	(China)	Nie Weiping
4	1991	(Japan)	Cho Chikun	(China)	Qian Yuping
5	1992	(Japan)	Otake Hideo	(Japan)	O Rissei
6	1993	(South Korea)	Yoo Changhyuk	(South Korea)	Cho Hunhyun
7	1994	(South Korea)	Cho Hunhyun	(South Korea)	Yoo Changhyuk
8	1995	(China)	Ma Xiaochun	(Japan)	Kobayashi Koichi
9	1996	(South Korea)	Lee Chang-ho	(China)	Ma Xiaochun
10	1997	(Japan)	Kobayashi Koichi	(Japan)	O Rissei
11	1998	(South Korea)	Lee Chang-ho	(China)	Chang Hao
12	1999	(South Korea)	Yoo Changhyuk	(China)	Ma Xiaochun
13	2000	(South Korea)	Cho Hunhyun	(China)	Chang Hao
14	2001	(South Korea)	Cho Hunhyun	(South Korea)	Choi Myung-Hoon
15	2002	(South Korea)	Lee Sedol	(South Korea)	Yoo Changhyuk
16	2003	(South Korea)	Lee Sedol	(South Korea)	Song Tae Kon
17	2004	(South Korea)	Pak Yeong-hun	(Japan)	Yoda Norimoto
18	2005	(South Korea)	Lee Sedol	(South Korea)	Choi Cheol-han
19	2006	(South Korea)	Park Jungsang	(China)	Zhou Heyang
20	2007	(South Korea)	Pak Yeong-hun	(South Korea)	Lee Chang-ho
21	2008	(China)	Gu Li	(South Korea)	Lee Chang-ho
22	2009	(South Korea)	Kang Dongyun	(South Korea)	Lee Chang-ho
23	2010	(China)	Kong Jie	(South Korea)	Lee Sedol
24	2011	(South Korea)	Park Junghwan	(China)	Qiu Jun
