= KBS Cup =

The KBS Cup is a South Korean Go competition.

== Outline ==
The KBS Cup is sponsored by KBS. From 1980 to 2003, the tournament was named the KBS Baduk Wang, but was recently renamed to the KBS Cup. The main tournament consists of 16 players who compete in a knockout tournament. There is a winner's and a loser's round to decide the challenger. The thinking time is 5 minutes with byo-yomi.

Formerly, the final was a best-of-3 match. In 2023, the final match was a single game.

It is broadcast live by KBS 1TV.

== Past winners ==
Player	Titles	Years Held
Cho Hunhyun	11	1980, 1981, 1984, 1986, 1987, 1989, 1990, 1992, 1996, 1997, 1999
Lee Chang-ho	11	1988, 1991, 1994, 1998, 2001, 2002, 2004, 2005, 2007–2009
Park Junghwan	5	2010–2012, 2015, 2017
Shin Jinseo	4	2019–2021, 2023
Lee Sedol	3	2006, 2013, 2016
Seo Bongsoo	1	1983
Ha Chan-seok	1	1985
Yoo Changhyuk	1	1995
Mok Jin-seok	1	2000
Song Tae Kon	1	2003
Lee Dong-hoon	1	2014
Shin Minjun	1	2018

== Final results ==
Volume	Year	Winners	Score	Runners-up
1	1980	Cho Hunhyun	2–0	No Yeongha
2	1981	Cho Hunhyun	2–0	Kim Hui-jung
not held	1982	-	-	-
3	1983	Seo Bongsoo	2–0	Kim Jwa-gi
4	1984	Cho Hunhyun	2–1	Seo Bong-soo
5	1985	Ha Chan-seok	2–1	Kim Hui-jung
6	1986	Cho Hunhyun	2–1	Kim Hui-jung
7	1987	Cho Hunhyun	2–0	Seo Nungwuk
8	1988	Lee Chang-ho	2–1	Kim Soojang
9	1989	Cho Hunhyun	2–1	Seo Nungwuk
10	1990	Cho Hunhyun	2–0	Seo Nungwuk
11	1991	Lee Chang-ho	2–1	Cho Hunhyun
12	1992	Cho Hunhyun	2–0	Yoo Changhyuk
not held	1993	-	-	-
13	1994	Lee Chang-ho	2–0	Cho Hunhyun
14	1995	Yoo Changhyuk	2–0	Lee Chang-ho
15	1996	Cho Hunhyun	2–1	Lee Chang-ho
16	1997	Cho Hunhyun	2–0	Lee Chang-ho
17	1998	Lee Chang-ho	2–0	Jeong Su-hyeon
18	1999	Cho Hunhyun	2–0	Lee Chang-ho
19	2000	Mok Jin-seok	2–1	Lee Chang-ho
20	2001	Lee Chang-ho	2–0	Lee Sedol
21	2002	Lee Chang-ho	2–1	Lee Sanghun
22	2003	Song Tae-kon	2–0	Park Byeong-gyu
23	2004	Lee Chang-ho	2–0	Cho Hanseung
24	2005	Lee Chang-ho	2–0	Yoo Changhyuk
25	2006	Lee Sedol	2–0	Choi Cheol-han
26	2007	Lee Chang-ho	2–1	Cho Hanseung
27	2008	Lee Chang-ho	2–1	Lee Sedol
28	2009	Lee Chang-ho	2–0	Kang Dongyun
29	2010	Park Junghwan	2–0	Paek Hongsuk
30	2011	Park Junghwan	2–0	Paek Hongsuk
31	2012	Park Junghwan	2–1	Lee Chang-ho
32	2013	Lee Sedol	2–1	Park Junghwan
33	2014	Lee Dong-hoon	2–0	Park Junghwan
34	2015	Park Junghwan	2–1	Lee Sedol
35	2016	Lee Sedol	2–0	Na Hyeon
36	2017	Park Junghwan	2–0	Kim Ji-seok
37	2018	Shin Minjun	2–0	Park Junghwan
38	2019	Shin Jin-seo	2–1	Shin Minjun
39	2020	Shin Jin-seo	2–0	An Seongjun
40	2021	Shin Jin-seo	2–0	Park Junghwan
41	2023	Shin Jin-seo	1–0	Park Junghwan
