= Park Jung-sang =

South Korean Go player

Park Jungsang
Personal information
- Native name: 박정상 (Korean); 朴正祥 (Korean)
- Born: 23 August 1984 (age 41) South Korea

Sport
- Turned pro: 2000
- Teacher: Heo Jang-Hwoi
- Rank: 9 dan
- Affiliation: Hanguk Kiwon

Park Jungsang (Korean: 박정상; born 23 August 1984) is a Korean professional Go player.

== Biography ==
Park was born in South Korea. He became a professional in 2000, and was promoted to 4 dan in 2003. In 2004, he won his first Go competition, the SK Gas Cup. In 2006, he pulled upset victories over top players from China, South Korea, and Japan to win the 19th Fujitsu Cup. It continued South Korea's successive run of 9 straight tournament wins. His rank was increased to 6 dan due to the win. He was promoted to 9 dan in 2006. Park is active in game commentary for KBS since 2013.

== Promotion record ==
Rank	Year	Notes
1 dan	2000	
2 dan		
3 dan		
4 dan		
5 dan		
6 dan		
7 dan		
8 dan		
9 dan	2006	Special promotion from 6 to 9 dan for winning the 19th Fujitsu Cup.

== Career record ==
- 2006: 62 wins, 32 losses
- 2007: 59 wins, 32 losses
- 2008: 52 wins, 28 losses
- 2009: 30 wins, 21 losses
- 2010: 41 wins, 19 losses

== Titles & runners-up ==
Domestic
Title	Wins	Runners-up
Maxim Cup		1 (2007)
King of Kings		1 (2006)
SK Gas Cup	1 (2004)	
Osram Cup	1 (2006)	
Total	2	2
International
Fujitsu Cup	1 (2006)	
Zhonghuan Cup		1 (2007)
World Mind Sports Game		1 (2008)
Total	1	2
Career total
Total	3	4

=== Korean Baduk League ===
Season	Team	Place	Record
2005	Team Holy Construction	Champions	3–4
2006	Team Kixx	Champions	9–5
2007	Team Kixx	7th place	7–5
2008	Team Kixx	8th place	6–8
2009	Team Shinan Taepyeong	5th place	7–5
2010	Team Yeongnam Ilbo	9th place	9–7
2011	Team Kixx (Captain)	TBD	0–2
