= Ma Xiaochun =

Chinese Go player

Personal information
- Native name: Trad. 馬暁春 Simp. 马晓春 (Chinese); Mǎ Xiǎochūn (Pinyin)
- Full name: Ma Xiaochun
- Born: 26 August 1964 (age 61) Shengzhou, Zhejiang, China

Sport
- Turned pro: 1982
- Teacher: Fujisawa Hideyuki
- Pupil: Shao Weigang, Luo Xihe
- Rank: 9 dan
- Affiliation: Chinese Weiqi Association

Ma Xiaochun (simplified Chinese: 马晓春; traditional Chinese: 馬暁春; pinyin: Mǎ Xiǎochūn; born 26 August 1964 ~ ) is a Chinese professional Go player.

== Biography ==
Ma was born in Shengzhou, Zhejiang, China. He began playing Go at the age of nine and was awarded 7 dan rank in 1982. In 1983, Ma was promoted to 9 dan. He visited Japan in 1982 and later won the World Amateur Go Championship in 1983. Ma won the 2nd Mingren title in 1989 and successfully defended it for thirteen straight years, second most behind Cho Hunhyun's sixteen Paewang titles.

== Titles and runners-up ==
As of 1 May 2019

Ranks #1 in total number of titles in China.

Domestic
Title	Wins	Runners-up
Guoshou	2 (1982, 1985)	1 (1983)
National Go Individual	5 (1982, 1984, 1986, 1987, 1991)	2 (1980, 1981)
New Sports Cup	2 (1984, 1985)	1 (1986)
Tianyuan	4 (1987, 1994–1996)	3 (1988, 1992, 1997)
Mingren	13 (1989–2001)	1 (2002)
CCTV Cup	6 (1989, 1991-1992, 1994-1995, 2002)	3 (1993, 1998, 2001)
Shiqiang	2 (1990, 1992)	3 (1989, 1991, 1993)
Qiwang	4 (1991, 1993-1995)	1 (2000)
Da Guoshou	2 (1993, 1994)	
Longshan	1 (1995)	
Rongguan Cup	1 (1995)	
Bawang Cup	1 (1996)	1 (1997)
Youqing Cup	1 (1996)	2 (1995, 1997)
Delong Yiye Cup	2 (1997-1998)	
Ahan Tongshan Cup	1 (1999)	1 (2001)
Qisheng		1 (1999)
Lebaishi Cup		1 (2000)
Weifu Fangkai Cup		1 (2007)
Total	47	22
Continental
Title	Wins	Runners-up
China-Japan Agon Cup		1 (2000)
China-Japan Tengen	3 (1994–1996)	
China-Japan Mingren	2 (1992, 1994)	4 (1989-1991, 1993)
Zhangshu Cup		1 (2017)
Total	5	6
International
Title	Wins	Runners-up
Tong Yang Cup	1 (1995)	1 (1996)
Fujitsu Cup	1 (1995)	2 (1996, 1999)
Asian TV Cup		1 (1998)
Samsung Cup		1 (1998)
LG Cup		1 (1999)
Chunlan Cup		1 (2000)
Total	2	7
Career total
Total	54	35
