= Yu Bin (Go player) =

Chinese Go player

Personal information
- Native name: 俞斌 (Chinese); Yú Bīn (Pinyin)
- Full name: Yu Bin
- Born: April 16, 1967 (age 59) Zhejiang, China

Sport
- Turned pro: 1985 (full time)
- Pupil: Qiu Jun
- Rank: 9 dan
- Affiliation: Chinese Weiqi Association

Yu Bin (Chinese: 俞斌; pinyin: Yú Bīn; born April 16, 1967) is a Chinese professional Go player. He is the head coach of the Chinese national team since 2009.

== Biography ==
He became 9 dan in 1991 at the age of 24.

== Results ==
As of 25 November 2017

Domestic
Title	Wins	Runners-up
New Sports Cup	2 (1988, 1993)	2 (1989, 1989)
Mingren		3 (1988, 1990, 2005)
National Go Individual		6 (1991, 1993–1996, 1998)
CCTV Cup		2 (1997, 2004)
Qiwang	2 (2000, 2002)	1 (1989)
Qisheng	1 (2001)	
Lebaishi Cup		1 (2002)
Yongda Cup		1 (2002)
Ahan Tongshan Cup	1 (2002)	
Weifu Fangkai Cup		1 (2003)
Quzhou-Lanke Cup	1 (2006)	
Total	7	17
Continental
China-Japan Agon Cup		1 (2002)
Total	0	1
International
Asian TV Cup	2 (1997, 2004)	
LG Cup	1 (2000)	1 (2005)
Total	3	1
Career Total
Total	10	19
