= Ō Rissei =

Japanese Go player

O Rissei
Personal information
- Native name: 王立誠 (Chinese); Wáng Lìchéng (Pinyin)
- Full name: Rissei Ō
- Born: 7 November 1958 (age 67) Taiwan

Sport
- Turned pro: 1972
- Teacher: Kano Yoshinori
- Rank: 9 dan
- Affiliation: Nihon Ki-in; Tokyo branch

Ō Rissei (Chinese: 王立誠; pinyin: Wáng Lìchéng; born 7 November 1958) is a professional Go player in Japan.

Rissei was born in Taiwan and moved to Japan when he was 13 years old; he would become professional the following year. His instructor is Kano Yoshinori, while he is the instructor of his daughter O Keii, professional 2 dan.

== Titles and runners-up ==
Ranks #10-t in total number of titles in Japan.

Domestic
Title	Wins	Runners-up
Kisei	3 (2000–2002)	1 (2003)
Meijin		1 (1998)
Honinbo		1 (1998)
Judan	4 (2001–2004)	2 (1996, 2005)
Oza	4 (1995, 1998–2000)	2 (1996, 2001)
Agon Cup	1 (1994)	1 (2001)
NHK Cup	1 (1997)	2 (1988, 2003)
Shinjin-O	1 (1981)	1 (1986)
NEC Cup		3 (1989, 1998, 2002)
Kakusei	4 (1989, 1993, 1999, 2000)	1 (1990)
Hayago Championship		2 (1992, 1997)
Shin-Ei	1 (1983)	
Prime Minister Cup		1 (1980)
Total	19	18
Continental
Asian TV Cup		1 (1997)
Total	0	1
International
LG Cup	1 (1998)	
Chunlan Cup	1 (2000)	1 (2001)
Fujitsu Cup		2 (1992, 1997)
Zhonghuan Cup		1 (2004)
Total	2	4
Career total
Total	21	23
