= Zhou Heyang =

Chinese Go player

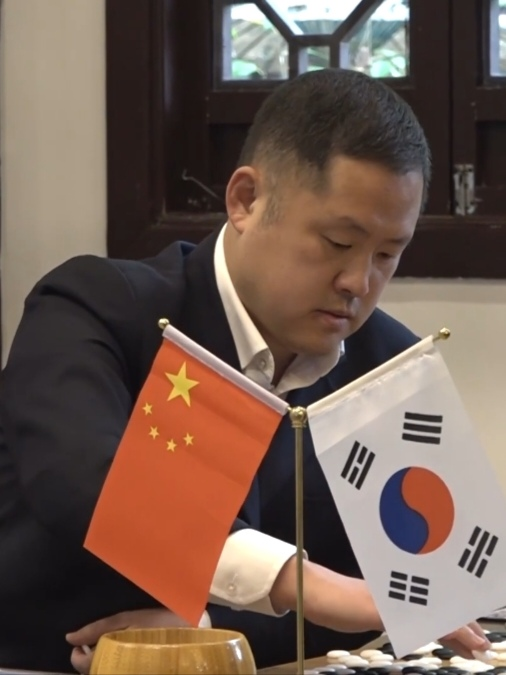
- Zhou at 2024 6th Nie Weiping Cup

Personal information
- Native name: Trad. 周鶴洋 Simp. 周鹤洋 (Chinese); Zhōu Hèyáng (Pinyin)
- Born: June 18, 1976 (age 50) Henan, China

Sport
- Turned pro: 1988
- Teacher: Nie Weiping
- Rank: 9 dan
- Affiliation: Chinese Weiqi Association

Zhou Heyang (Traditional: 周鶴洋; Simplified: 周鹤洋; Pinyin: Zhōu Hèyáng; born June 18, 1976) is a Chinese professional Go player.

== Biography ==
Zhou Heyang was born in Luoyang, Henan, China. He is a Chinese professional Go player. He turned professional in 1988, and advanced to 9 dan in 2001. He started learning how to play Go at the age of 8. When he was 11, he joined the National Wei-qi Youth Team.

== As A Child ==
Zhou was described as being a mischievous, boisterous, opinionated and pugnacious child. He learnt Go because his father thought he'd change his behavior. He progressed and improved quickly. He hated losing, and it could be seen. At the age of 10, he already achieved 4th place at the National Youth Championships. Since he was 4th in the tournament, he left home and joined the National Youth Squad in Beijing to learn more about Go. The team had an outstanding squad of Shao Weigang, Lui Jing, Chang Hao, Luo Xihe, Wang Lei, and Zhou himself. The problem Zhou had was that he was not like the other players. He did not go through the normal system of city or province squads. He never had those training methods. He slowly matured up after joining the team. It took him a long 18 months to finally reach the average strength of the group. He was still a very unconfident player. There was harsh criticism in the training system the team used. This is the one part Zhou had an advantage, and that was his stubbornness. Zhou was very lucky because the squad teacher, Wu Yulin, kept him with the team even though he was progressing much slower than the other teammates. Zhou would gain patience from the criticism, and now could count a game accurately.

== Growing Up ==
Zhou was getting much stronger now. It was said that if he ever got ahead in a game, not even Lee Chang-ho could come back and win. This became true when he beat Lee in the 10th Fujitsu Cup before following up on beating him again in the 13th Fujitsu Cup. He is not like Lee, but he claims that both their abilities to count in the yose (end game) is above others.

Zhou finally won his first major tournament when he won the 1996 National Go Individual. He would then get entry into the next year's Fujitsu Cup, but he was blocked off by Kobayashi Koichi after beating Choi Myung-Hoon, Takemiya Masaki, and Lee Chang-ho.

== Promotion record ==
Rank	Year	Notes
1 dan	1988	Promoted to professional dan rank after passing qualifying test.
2 dan	1989	
3 dan	1990	
4 dan	1992	From wins in the Chinese Promotion Tournament.
5 dan	1994	From wins in the Chinese Promotion Tournament.
6 dan	1995	From wins in the Chinese Promotion Tournament.
7 dan	1997	From wins in the Chinese Promotion Tournament.
8 dan	1999	From wins in the Chinese Promotion Tournament.
9 dan	2001	From wins in the Chinese Promotion Tournament.

== Titles & Runners-up ==
As of 1 January 2019

Ranks ninth in the total number of titles in China.

Domestic
Title	Wins	Runners-up
National Go Individual	2 (1996, 1999)	
NEC Cup	1 (1999)	2 (2001, 2003)
Qisheng	1 (2000)	
National Go Individual		1 (2001)
Ricoh Cup		1 (2001)
National Sports Mass Meeting		1 (2002)
Mingren	1 (2002)	1 (2003)
CCTV Cup	1 (2003)	1 (2009)
Weifu Fangkai Cup		1 (2004)
Xinan Wang	1 (2004)	
Ahan Tongshan Cup	2 (2000, 2004)	1 (1999)
Changqi Cup	1 (2006)	
Tianyuan		2 (2005, 2008)
Liguang Cup		1 (2009)
Total	10	12
Continental
China-Japan Agon Cup	1 (2005)	
Total	1	0
International
Asian TV Cup	1 (2003)	
Chunlan Cup		1 (2006)
Fujitsu Cup		1 (2006)
Total	1	2
Career Total
Total	12	14
