= Maxim Cup =

South Korean Go competition

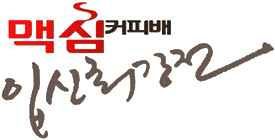
- Started: 2000
- Sponsors: Maxim (Dongsuh Foods Corporation)
- Prize money: 50,000,000 Won

The Maxim Cup (Korean: 맥심커피배) is a South Korean Go competition.

== Outline ==
The Maxim Cup is sponsored by Dong Suh Foods. The players are selected with any active 9p's and they are pitted against each other.

Each player has 10 minutes of time with five 40-second byoyomi periods. The komi is 6.5 points. The winner's prize is 50 million won and the runner-up's prize is 20 million won.

== Past winners ==
Player	Years Held
Choi Kyu-Byung	2000
Yoo Changhyuk	2001, 2002
Jiang Zhujiu	2003
Rui Naiwei	2004
Lee Sedol	2005 - 2007, 2014, 2016
Park Young-Hoon	2008, 2011
Choi Cheol-han	2009, 2010, 2015
Park Junghwan	2012, 2013, 2017, 2022
Cho Hanseung	2018
Shin Jinseo	2019, 2023, 2024
Lee Ji-hyeon	2020, 2025
Kim Jiseok	2021
Byun Sang-il	2026
