= BC Card Cup (Korea's national championship) =

- Full name: BC Card Cup
- Started: 1990
- Sponsors: BC Card
- Prize money: 20,000,000 Won/$21,000
- Affiliation: Hanguk Kiwon

The BC Card Cup is a Go competition in South Korea.

== Outline ==
The BC Card Cup is a tournament for 20 young players. It is a Go title in South Korea, the equivalent to the Shinjin-O title in Japan. The tournament first started in 1990, and is still in existence after 17 years.

The format is a win-and-continue for the first 19 games. If you lose, you are out of the tournament. The holder of the title only plays one game, in which he needs to win to enter the final of the tournament. Once the final tournament starts, it's a knockout tournament. Players with the best record in the preliminaries are seeded into the 2nd round. The players get 3 hours in total to play each game, and the komi is 6.5 points.

== Past winners ==
Player	Years Held
Cho Hunhyun	1990, 1995
Lee Chang-ho	1991–1994, 1996
Mok Jin-seok	1997
Kim Mansu	1998
Lee Sang-Hoon	1999
Cho Hanseung	2001
Lee Sedol	2002
Song Tae Kon	2003
An Choyoung	2004
Park Young-Hoon	2005
Heo Young-ho	2006
Won Seong-jin	2007
