= Tongyang Cup =

The Tongyang Cup (Korean: 동양증권배 세계선수권전, Hanja: 東洋證券杯世界選手權戰) was a Go competition. The Tong Yang Cup was sponsored by Tongyang Securities of South Korea. The tournament was run from 1988 to 1998, with players from South Korea, Taiwan, the United States, Japan, China and European countries.

== Past winners ==
Years Played	Winner	Runner Up
1988-1989	(South Korea) Yang Jae-ho	(South Korea) Jang Soo Young
1989-1990	(South Korea) Seo Bongsoo	(South Korea) Lee Chang-ho
1990-1992	(South Korea) Lee Chang-ho	(Japan) Rin Kaiho
1992-1993	(South Korea) Lee Chang-ho	(Japan) Cho Chikun
1993-1994	(South Korea) Cho Hunhyun	(Japan) Yoda Norimoto
1994-1995	(China) Ma Xiaochun	(China) Nie Weiping
1995-1996	(South Korea) Lee Chang-ho	(China) Ma Xiaochun
1997	(South Korea) Cho Hunhyun	(Japan) Kobayashi Satoru
1998	(South Korea) Lee Chang-ho	(South Korea) Yoo Changhyuk
