= Chou Chun-hsun =

Taiwanese Go player

Personal information
- Native name: Trad. 周俊勳 Simp. 周俊勋 (Chinese); Zhōu Jùnxūn (Pinyin)
- Full name: Chou Chun-hsun
- Born: February 23, 1980 (age 46) Taipei, Taiwan

Sport
- Rank: 9 dan
- Affiliation: Taiwan Qiyuan

Chou Chun-hsun (Taiwanese POJ: Chiu Chùn-hun; born February 23, 1980) is a Go player.

== Biography ==
Chou was born in Taipei, Taiwan. During the 1980s and 1990s, professional Go was not a very established game in Taiwan and did not present many opportunities for its players, but unlike many other professional Taiwanese players who relocated to Japan to further their careers, Chou decided that he would compete solely in Taiwan. Chou became a professional in 1993. He would later achieve a 7 dan ranking in 1997, then finally a 9 dan in 1998. He was the first professional player to achieve a 9 dan ranking while competing only in Taiwan . He is widely credited as the best player of the Taiwan Qiyuan, although with the increasing popularity of Go in his country, his status has been challenged by other opponents. He won his first international title, LG Cup, in 2007 beating Hu Yaoyu 2 to 1. He is the only player from Taiwan Qiyuan to win an international as of 2022 (Hsu Hao-hung became the next Taiwanese international winner in 2023).

He is nicknamed as the "red-faced go master" due to the presence of a large birth mark on his right face. In the west his name is often rendered as "Chun-Hsun Chou".

He is the elder brother of Chou Ping-chiang(周平強), a 7-dan Go professional.

== Titles & runners-up ==
Title	Years Held
Current	8
Tianyuan (Taiwan)	2002–2006
(Taiwan) Wangjia	2005, 2006
Mingren (Taiwan)	1994–2006
(Taiwan) Donggang Cup	2006
International	1
(South Korea) (Japan) (Taiwan) (China) LG Cup	2007
Defunct	9
Taiwan Qiyuan Cup	2004, 2005
Taiwan High Pro	1995–1997

Title	Years Lost
Defunct	2
Taiwan Zhonghuan	1996, 1997
