= Lebaishi Cup =

The Lebaishi Cup (Traditional:樂百氏杯; Simplified: 乐百氏杯; Pinyin: Lèbǎishì Bēi) was a Zhongguo Qiyuan Go competition.

== Outline ==
The Lebaishi Cup was sponsored by Robust Incorporated. The winner's purse is 128,000 CY ($15,600).

Robust Incorporated is a Chinese drink company. It was a local milk-production company in Guangdong, before it was purchased by French company Danone in the early 2000.

== Past winners ==
Player	Years Held
Chang Hao	1998 - 2002
