= Cho Han-seung =

South Korean Go player (born 1982)

Cho Hanseung
Personal information
- Native name: 조한승 (Korean); 趙漢乘 (Korean); Cho Hansŭng (McCune–Reischauer)
- Full name: Cho Hanseung
- Born: November 27, 1982 (age 43) South Korea

Sport
- Turned pro: 1995
- Teacher: Lee Kwan Chul
- Rank: 9 dan
- Affiliation: Hanguk Kiwon

Cho Han-seung
Medal record

Representing South Korea

Asian Games
Gold medal – first place	2010 Guangzhou	Men's Team

Cho Hanseung (Korean: 조한승, born November 27, 1982), also known as Jo Hanseung, is a South Korean professional go player.

== Biography ==
Cho turned professional in 1995. He was promoted to 7 dan in 2004, 8 dan in 2005 and 9 dan in 2006.

== Titles and runners-up ==
Domestic
Title	Wins	Runners-up
Guksu (55th)	1 (2011)	1 (2002)
Myungin		1 (2007)
GS Caltex Cup	1 (2009)	2 (2003, 2010)
Chunwon	1 (2006)	
KBS Cup		1 (2007)
Yeongnam Ilbo Cup		1 (2005)
BC Card Cup	1 (2001)	
SK Gas Cup	1 (2003)	
New Pro King	1 (2001)	
Maxim Cup	1 (2018)	
Total	7	6

Continental
Title	Wins	Runners-up
Asian TV Cup		2 (2005, 2008)
China-Korea Tengen		1 (2007)
China-Korea New Pro Wang		1 (2001)
Total	0	4

International
Title	Wins	Runners-up
BC Card Cup		1 (2009)
Total	0	1

- Total: 5 titles, 11 runners-up.
