= China–Korea New Pro Wang =

The China–Korea New Pro Wang was a Go competition sponsored by BC Card.

== Outline ==
The China–Korea New Pro Wang is a tournament where players under the age of 25 from China and Korea compete.

== Past winners ==
Player	Years Held
(South Korea) Mok Jin-seok	1998
(South Korea) Kim Mansoo	1999
(China) Liu Shizhen	2000
(China) Gu Li	2001, 2005
(South Korea) Lee Sedol	2002
(China) Kong Jie	2003
(China) Qiu Jun	2004
