= Hu Yaoyu =

Chinese Go player

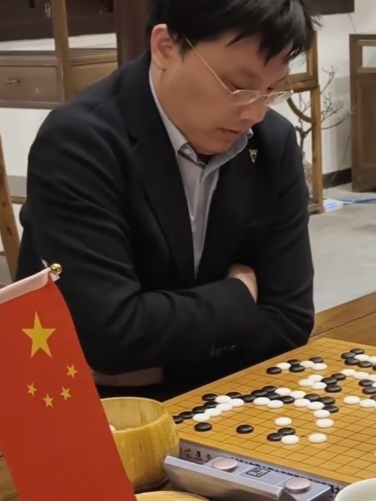
- Hu at 2024 6th Nie Weiping Cup

Personal information
- Native name: 胡耀宇 (Chinese); Hú Yàoyǔ (Pinyin)
- Full name: Hu Yaoyu
- Born: January 18, 1982 (age 44) Shanghai, China

Sport
- Turned pro: 1993
- Teacher: Liu Xiaoguang
- Rank: 8 dan
- Affiliation: Zhongguo Qiyuan

Hu Yaoyu (Chinese: 胡耀宇; pinyin: Hú Yàoyǔ; born January 18, 1982) is a Chinese professional Go player.

== Biography ==
Hu became a pro at the age most Chinese players do, which is 11. He quickly achieved 5 dan in 5 years, and became 8 dan in 2005. He has beaten some of the best players in the world, and he did it in order. From 2002 to 2003, he beat Kobayashi Koichi, Kim Seung-Jun, Kato Masao, Cho Hun-hyeon, and Yoda Norimoto in the 4th Nong Shim Cup.

== Titles & runners-up ==
Title	Years Held
Current	4
(China) CCTV Cup	2001
(China) Liguang Cup	2007
(China) Xinren Wang	1999
(China) Yongda Cup	2004

Title	Years Lost
Current	2
(China) Xinren Wang	2003
(China) Lebaishi Cup	2001
Continental	1
(South Korea) China-Korea New Pro Wang	1999
International	1
(China) (South Korea) (Japan) (Taiwan) LG Cup	2007
