= Park Yeong-hun =

South Korean Go player

Personal information
- Native name: 박영훈 (Korean); 朴永訓 (Korean); Pak Yŏnghun (McCune–Reischauer)
- Full name: Park Yeong-hun
- Born: April 1, 1985 (age 41), South Korea

Sport
- Turned pro: 1999
- Teacher: Choi Gyu-byeong
- Rank: 9 dan
- Affiliation: Hanguk Kiwon

Park Yeong-hun (Korean: 박영훈, born April 1, 1985), also known as Park Young-hoon and Pak Yeong-hoon, is a South Korean professional Go player.

== Biography ==
Park Yeong-hun was born in Seoul. He is a professional Go player in the Hanguk Kiwon.

He is the youngest ever Korean 9 dan, promoted when he was only 19 years old. Due to the new rules set by the Hanguk Kiwon, Park moved up from 1 dan to 9 in only 4 years and 7 months, which is the fastest progress ever.

Much of this was due to him winning the Fujitsu Cup in 2004 when he was at 4 dan. This also earned him exemption from military service.

His hobbies include tennis and playing Tetris.

== Titles and runners-up ==
He ranks #8 in total number of titles in Korea.

Domestic
Title	Wins	Runners-up
Myungin	2 (2010, 2011)	
GS Caltex Cup	2 (2007, 2008)	3 (2004, 2009, 2011)
Prices Information Cup	1 (2005)	
Chunwon	1 (2001)	
Maxim Cup	2 (2008, 2010)	1 (2009)
Kisung	4 (2005–2008)	
BC Card Cup	1 (2005)	
New Pro King	1 (2005)	
New Pro Strongest		1 (2003)
Yeongnam Ilbo Cup	1 (2005)	
Total	15	5
Continental
World Meijin	1 (2011)	1 (2012)
China-Korea Tengen	1 (2002)	
China-Korea New Pro Wang		1 (2005)
Total	2	2
International
Samsung Cup		2 (2003, 2007)
Fujitsu Cup	2 (2004, 2007)	
Zhonghuan Cup	1 (2004)	
Total	3	2
Career total
Total	19	9
