= Yoo Chang-hyuk =

South Korean Go player

Yoo Changhyuk
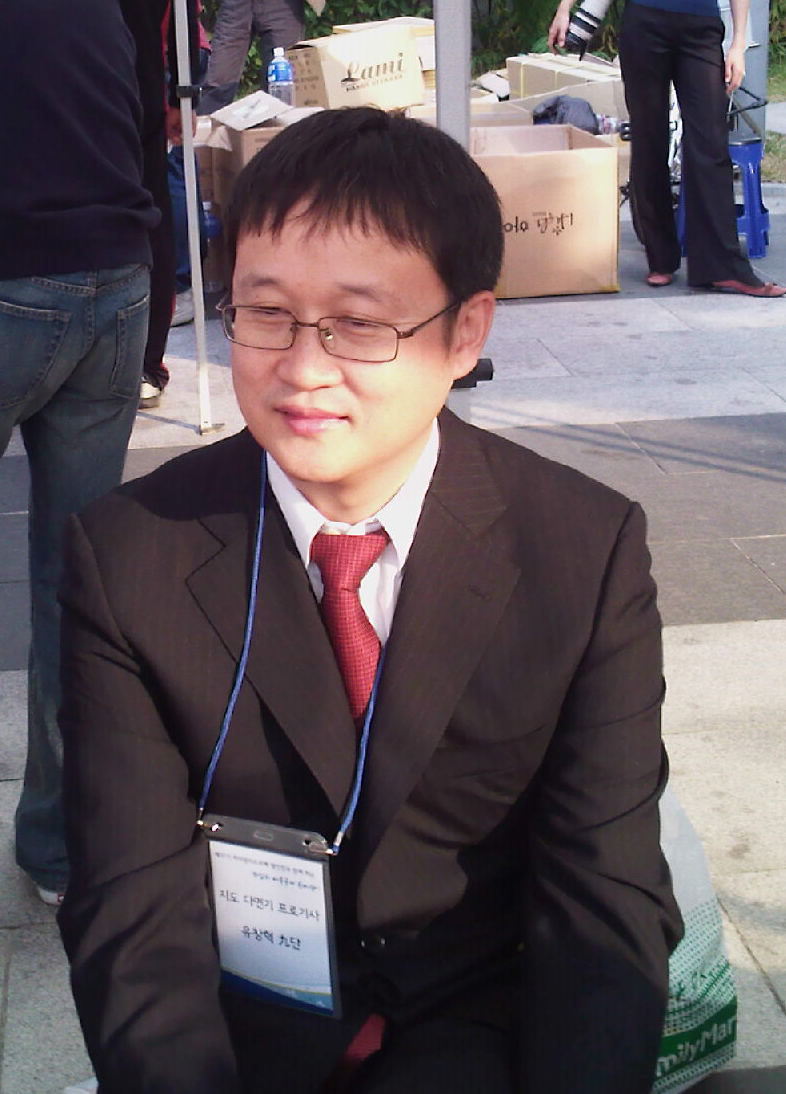

Personal information
- Native name: 유창혁 (Korean); 劉昌赫 (Korean); Yu Changhyeok (Revised Romanization)
- Full name: Yoo Changhyuk
- Born: April 25, 1966 (age 60), South Korea

Sport
- Turned pro: 1984
- Pupil: Choi Jeong
- Rank: 9 dan
- Affiliation: Hanguk Kiwon

Yoo Changhyuk (born April 25, 1966) is a professional Go player in South Korea.

== Biography ==
Yoo Changhyuk was one of Korea's best Go players. Growing up without a teacher, Yoo became a professional in 1984 and was promoted to 9 dan in 1996. He has won many international tournaments for Korea.

== Titles & runners-up ==
Title	Years Held
Current	9
(South Korea) Wangwi	1991–1994
(South Korea) Kisung	1991
(South Korea) KBS Baduk Wang	1995
(South Korea) Chunwon	1996
(South Korea) Maxim Cup	2001, 2002
Defunct	9
(South Korea) LG Refined Oil Cup	1996
(South Korea) Taewang	1984, 1988
(South Korea) Daewang	1988
(South Korea) Baccus Cup	1993
(South Korea) Paedal Cup	1998, 1999
(South Korea) KT Cup	2003
(South Korea) Paewang	2003
International	6
(South Korea) (Japan) (China) (Taiwan) LG Cup	2002
(South Korea) (Japan) (China) (Taiwan) Samsung Cup	2000
(Japan) (South Korea) (China) (Taiwan) (Europe) (United States) Fujitsu Cup	1993, 1999
(China) (South Korea) (Japan) (Taiwan) Chunlan Cup	2001
(China) (South Korea) (Japan) (Taiwan) Ing Cup	1996

Title	Years Lost
Current	9
(South Korea) Wangwi	1995, 1999
(South Korea) Kisung	1990, 1992, 2001
(South Korea) KBS Baduk Wang	1992
(South Korea) BC Card Cup	1993
(South Korea) Maxim Cup	2000, 2004
Defunct	12
(South Korea) LG Refined Oil Cup	1999
(South Korea) Myungin	1993, 2001
(South Korea) Baedalwang	2000
(South Korea) Gukgi	1995
(South Korea) Paewang	1994, 1997
(South Korea) Daewang	1989, 1991
(South Korea) Paedal Cup	2000
(South Korea) KTF Cup	2002
(South Korea) Kiwang	1994
Continental	1
(Japan) (South Korea) (China) (Taiwan) Asian TV Cup	1996
International	7
(South Korea) (Japan) (China) (Taiwan) LG Cup	1997, 1998, 2000
(South Korea) (Japan) (China) (Taiwan) Samsung Cup	1996
(Japan) (South Korea) (China) (Taiwan) (Europe) (United States) Fujitsu Cup	1994, 2002
(China) (South Korea) (Japan) (Taiwan) Tong Yang Cup	1998
