= Chang Hao (Go player) =

Chinese Go player (born 1976)

Chang Hao 常昊
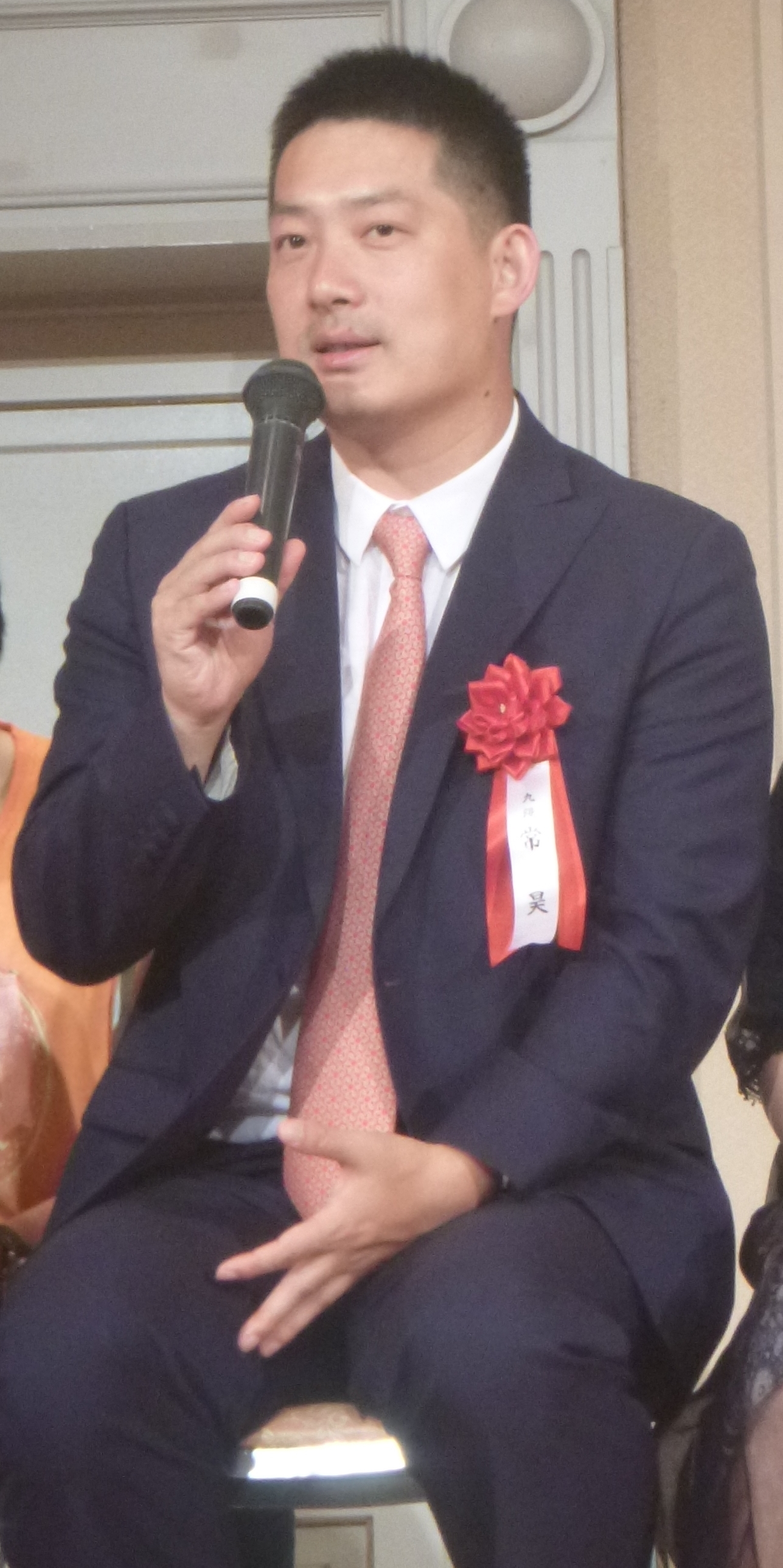

Personal information
- Full name: Chang Hao
- Born: November 7, 1976 (age 49) Shanghai, China

Sport
- Turned pro: 1986
- Teacher: Yang Yilun
- Rank: 9 dan
- Affiliation: Zhongguo Qiyuan

Chang Hao
- Traditional Chinese: 常昊
- Simplified Chinese: 常昊
Transcriptions
Standard Mandarin
- Hanyu Pinyin: Cháng Hào

Chang Hao
Medal record

Representing China

Asian Games
Silver medal – second place	2010 Guangzhou	Men's Team

Chang Hao (Chinese: 常昊; pinyin: Cháng Hào; born November 7, 1976, in Shanghai) is a professional Go player. He is a 9 dan Go player from China. He is China's best player of the 1990s and one of the best in the world. Growing up he was a prodigy in China, he has won many titles, including three international champions. He is the best friend of Lee Chang-ho, whom he most recently defeated in the final of the 7th Chunlan Cup. Some of his hobbies include playing football, swimming, and traveling. He is married to Zhang Xuan, who is also a Go player.

== Titles and runners-up ==
As of 1 May 2019

Ranks #3 in the total number of titles in China.

Domestic
Title	Wins	Runners-up
National Go Individual	1 (1995)	
Xinren Wang	1 (1996)	
Tianyuan	5 (1997–2001)	1 (2002)
Lebaishi Cup	5 (1998–2002)	
NEC Cup	3 (1998, 2002, 2005)	3 (1999, 2000, 2004)
CCTV Cup	1 (1999)	
Qisheng	1 (1999)	1 (2000)
Mingren		2 (1999, 2001)
Ricoh Cup	2 (2001, 2004)	2 (2006, 2007)
Yongda Cup	1 (2002)	
Quzhou-Lanke Cup		1 (2008)
Ahan Tongshan Cup		2 (2008, 2010)
Xinan Wang		1 (2014)
Total	20	13
Continental
China-Japan Tengen	4 (1997–1999, 2001)	1 (2000)
China-Korea Tengen	1 (2001)	4 (1997–2000)
Mingyue Shan Cup	2 (2014-2016)	
Zhangshu Cup		1 (2018)
Total	7	6
International
Fujitsu Cup		2 (1998, 2000)
World Oza		2 (2002, 2004)
Ing Cup	1 (2004)	1 (2000)
Samsung Cup	1 (2007)	1 (2001)
Chunlan Cup	1 (2009)	1 (2007)
BC Card Cup		1 (2010)
Total	3	8
Career total
Total	22	7
