= Lee Chang-ho =

South Korean Go player (born 1975)

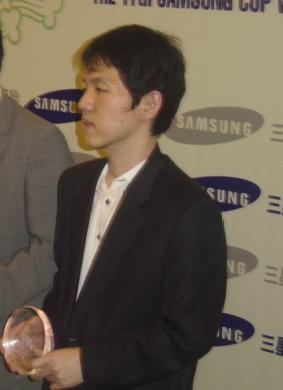

Personal information
- Native name: 이창호 (Korean); 李昌鎬 (Korean); I Changho (Revised Romanization); I Ch'angho (McCune–Reischauer)
- Born: July 29, 1975 (age 51) Jeonju, North Jeolla, South Korea

Sport
- Turned pro: 1986
- Teacher: Jeon Young-Sun; Cho Hun-hyun
- Rank: 9 dan
- Affiliation: Hanguk Kiwon

Lee Chang-ho
Medal record

Representing South Korea

Asian Games
Gold medal – first place	2010 Guangzhou	Men's Team

Lee Chang-ho (Korean: 이창호; born 29 July 1975) is a South Korean professional Go player of 9-dan rank. Considered to be one of the greatest Go players of all time, Lee was ranked #1 in the world in Go ELO rankings from 1991 to 2006.

== Biography ==
Lee was born in Jeonju, North Jeolla Province, South Korea. He turned professional in 1986 at the young age of 11. By the early 1990s, he started winning titles that his teacher, Cho Hun-hyun, had previously won. In 1992, Lee won his first international title, the 3rd Tong Yang Cup. Lee has won all of the international Go tournaments at least twice, excluding the World Oza and Ing Cup, which are held every two and four years respectively. In 2006, Lee won the Wangwi title for the eleventh consecutive year.

== Go career ==
Over the years, Lee's style of play has been broken down. Even Cho Chikun said that Lee Sedol would eventually pass Chang-ho because Chang-ho's style is no longer guaranteed due to the new generation of players. When asked if Lee's era was over, his teacher Cho Hunhyun simply replied, "No". He continued, saying that Lee Sedol is just someone who has finally fit the description of a rival for Chang-ho. He also said that both will battle many times and in the coming years the "smoke will settle" and one of them will come out on top.

== Personal life ==
Lee married the former amateur Go player Lee Do-yoon on 28 October 2010. Their daughter was born on 8 March 2012.

== Titles and runners-up ==
Ranks #2 in total number of titles in Korea and #1 in international titles.

Domestic
Title	Wins	Runners-up
Guksu	10 (1990, 1993–1997, 2001–2002, 2005, 2009)	7 (1989, 1991–1992, 1998, 2003, 2004, 2006)
Myungin	13 (1991–1996, 1998–2003, 2009)	2 (1990, 1997)
Sibdan Cup	2 (2005, 2007)	1 (2009)
GS Caltex Cup	6 (1997, 1998, 2001, 2003–2005)	
Prices Information Cup		3 (2005, 2009, 2010)
Chunwon	3 (1997–1999)	
KBS Cup	11 (1988, 1991, 1994, 1998, 2001–2002, 2004–2005, 2007–2009)	5 (1995–1997, 1999–2000)
Kisung	11 (1993–2003)	1 (2004)
Electron-Land Cup	3 (2005, 2006, 2008)	1 (2007)
Wangwi	14 (1990, 1995–2007)	2 (1991, 1993)
BC Card Cup	5 (1991–1994, 1996)	1 (1995)
Chaegowi	8 (1989–1991, 1993–1997)	2 (1988, 1992)
Daewang	6 (1990–1992, 1995–1997)	1 (1993)
Baccus Cup	3 (1990–1992)	
Taewang	4 (1991–1993, 1997)	
Paewang	4 (1993–1994, 2001–2002)	3 (1988, 1995, 2003)
Kiwang	2 (1993–1994)	1 (1995)
Gukgi	4 (1993–1996)	
Paedal Cup	4 (1993–1995, 1997)	2 (1996, 1998)
Baedalwang	4 (1993–1995, 1997)	1 (1998)
Total	117	33
Continental
World Mingren		1 (2010)
China-Korea Tengen	4 (1997–2000)	
Teda Cup	1 (2004)	
Total	5	1
International
Ing Cup	1 (2000)	1 (2008)
LG Cup	4 (1997, 1999, 2001, 2004)	3 (2003, 2010, 2012)
Samsung Cup	3 (1997–1999)	2 (2005, 2006)
Chunlan Cup	2 (2003, 2005)	2 (1999, 2009)
Fujitsu Cup	2 (1996, 1998)	3 (2007–2009)
Asian TV Cup	3 (1995, 1996, 2002)	4 (1990, 1999, 2000, 2006)
World Oza	1 (2002)	
Tong Yang Cup	4 (1992, 1993, 1996, 1998)	
Zhonghuan Cup	1 (2007)	
Total	21	15
Career total
Total	143	49

== See also ==
- Go players
