= Korea Baduk Association =

South Korean go (baduk) organization

- Hangul: 한국기원
- Hanja: 韓國棋院
- RR: Hanguk giwon
- MR: Han'guk kiwŏn

The Korea Baduk Association, also known as Hanguk Kiwon (Korean: 한국기원), is the organization that oversees Go (baduk) and Go tournaments in South Korea. It was founded in 1945 by Cho Namchul as the Hanseong Kiwon.

Baduk is a game which was present in Korea by the 5th century. It originated in China, but the West is more familiar with the Japanese name Go. This is because the Japanese were the first to introduce it to the West. Japan was introduced to the game in the 7th century AD. Initially, most Korean players followed the sunjang style of beginning by placing sixteen stones—eight white and eight black—on the board in a preset pattern. Cho Namchul, who had studied in Japan, knew that the international players began with an empty board like Japan since Japan was the first to introduce the game to the West. By forming the association, he set about convincing Koreans players to use the "modern" style.

== See also ==
- International Go Federation
- List of professional Go tournaments
- American Go Association
- European Go Federation
- Nihon Ki-in (Japanese Go Association)
- Taiwan Chi-Yuan (Taiwanese Go Association)
- Chinese Weiqi Association (Chinese Go Association)
