= 32nd Meijin =

The 32nd Meijin is the 32nd iteration of the Meijin go tournament. The name Meijin refers to the traditional title given to the superior play during the Edo period.

== Preliminaries ==
=== Group A ===
Quarter-finals
Kenichi Mochizuki 6 dan	0
Shuya Fujii 6 dan	1
Tomoyasu Mimura 9 dan	1
Masaki Ogata 9 dan	0
Rin Shien 6 dan	1
Yusaku Ogaki 9 dan	0
Yo Kagen 9 dan	0
Toshiya Imamura 9 dan	1

Semi-finals
Shuya Fujii 6 dan	0
Tomoyasu Mimura 9 dan	1
Rin Shien 6 dan	1
Toshiya Imamura 9 dan	0

Final
Tomoyasu Mimura 9 dan	1
Rin Shien 6 dan	0

=== Group B ===
Quarter-finals
Shigeaki Yokota 9 dan	1
O Meien 9 dan	0
Tetsuya Kiyonari 9 dan	0
Noriyoshi Yamada 9 dan	1
Masaki Takemiya 9 dan	1
Takashi Takei 6 dan	0
Naoto Hikosaka 9 dan	1
Han Zenki 7 dan	0

Semi-finals
Shigeaki Yokota 9 dan	0
Noriyoshi Yamada 9 dan	1
Masaki Takemiya 9 dan	0
Naoto Hikosaka 9 dan	1

Final
Noriyoshi Yamada 9 dan	0
Naoto Hikosaka 9 dan	1

=== Group C ===
Quarter-finals
O Rissei 9 dan	0
Atsushi Tsuruyama 6 dan	1
So Yokoku 8 dan	0
Naoki Hane 9 dan	1
Rin Kaiho 9 dan	0
Satoshi Kataoka 9 dan	1
Yuta Iyama 7 dan	0
Ko Iso 7 dan	1

Semi-finals
Atsushi Tsuruyama 6 dan	0
Naoki Hane 9 dan	0
Satoshi Kataoka 8 dan	0
Ko Iso 7 dan	1

Final
Naoki Hane 9 dan	0
Ko Iso 7 dan	1

== Main tournament ==
=== Group stage ===
Player	C.U.	Y.K.	S.H.	K.S.	Y.K.	Y.N.	H.N.	M.T.	K.I.	T
Cho U Gosei	X	W+0.5	B-0.5	W+0.5	B+R	W+5.5	B+1.5	W+R	B+4.5	7-1
Yamashita Keigo Kisei	B-0.5	X	W-R	B-R	W-5.5	B-4.5	W-R	B-0.5	W+R	1-7
Sakai Hideyuki 7 dan	W+0.5	B+R	X	W-0.5	B-R	W-0.5	B+8.5	W-0.5	B+R	4-4
Kobayashi Satoru 9 dan	B-0.5	W+R	B+0.5	X	W+R	B-1.5	W+R	B-R	W-R	4-4
Yamada Kimio 9 dan	W-R	B+5.5	W+R	B-R	X	W+1.5	B-R	W+R	B+R	5-3
Yoda Norimoto 9 dan	B-5.5	W+4.5	B+0.5	W+1.5	B-1.5	X	W-0.5	B+R	W-3.5	4-4
Hikosaka Naoto 9 dan	W-1.5	B+R	W-8.5	B-R	W+R	B+0.5	X	W-1.5	B-1.5	3-5
Mimura Tomoyasu 9 dan	B-R	W+0.5	B+0.5	W+R	B-R	W-R	B+1.5	X	W-R	4-4
Ko Iso 7 dan	W-4.5	B-R	W-R	B+R	W-R	B+3.5	W+1.5	B+R	X	4-4

Key:

- Green - Winner of group; challenges for title or earns a spot in the challenger final
- Blue - Earns a place in the next edition's group stage.
- Red - Eliminated from automatic berth; must qualify through preliminary stages.

== Finals ==
Player	1 (-)	2 (-)	3 (-)	4 (-)	5 (-)	6 (-)	7 (-)	T
Cho U	W-4.5	B+R	W+1,5	B+R	W-2.5	B-0.5	W+2.5	4
Takao Shinji (Meijin)	B+4,5	W-R	B-1.5	W-R	B+2.5	W+0.5	B-2.5	3

Key

- W+ - Won by
- R - Resignation
