= 45th Judan =

The 45th Judan was held from May 11, 2006 to April 25, 2007. The current sponsor is Sankei Newspapers. The holder is Cho Chikun, and the challenger is Keigo Yamashita for the second time in a row. Hideki Komatsu, Norimoto Yoda, Kimio Yamada, Hideo Otake, Koichi Kobayashi, Kim Shushun, Naoki Hane, and Takeshi Sakai qualified through preliminary tournaments. The rest of the players were given spots automatically.

== Preliminaries ==
Semifinals
Shigeaki Yokota 9 dan	0
Hideki Komatsu 9 dan	1
Yoshio Ishida 9 dan	1
Toshiya Imamura 9 dan	0

Finals
Hideki Komatsu 9 dan	1
Yoshio Ishida 9 dan	0

Semifinals
Norimoto Yoda Gosei	1
Hideyuki Sakai 7 dan	0
Shinichi Aoki 9 dan	0
Kenichi Mochizuki 6 dan	1

Finals
Norimoto Yoda Gosei	1
Kenichi Mochizuki 6 dan	0

Semifinals
Yo Kaei 8 dan	0
Kimio Yamada 9 dan	1
Rin Kono Tengen	1
Kunihisa Honda 9 dan	0

Finals
Kimio Yamada 9 dan	1
Rin Kono Tengen	0

Semifinals
Noriyoshi Yamada 9 dan	0
Kana Mannami 3 dan ♀	1
Ryu Shikun 9 dan	0
Hideo Otake Honorary Gosei	1

Finals
Kana Mannami 3 dan	0
Hideo Otake Honorary Gosei	1

Semifinals
Koichi Kobayashi Honorary Kisei	1
Naoto Hikosaka 9 dan	0
Shinya Nakamura 8 dan	1
Katsunori Yanaka 8 dan	0

Finals
Koichi Kobayashi Honorary Kisei	0
Shinya Nakamura 8 dan	1

Semifinals
Kim Shushun 7 dan	1
Mitsuhisa Yukawa 9 dan	0
Masaki Ogata 9 dan	0
Michael Redmond 9 dan	1

Finals
Kim Shushun 7 dan	1
Michael Redmond 9 dan	0

Semifinals
Masayuki Kurahashi 9 dan	0
Maki Sakai 8 dan	1
Naoki Hane 9 dan	0
Cho Sonjin 9 dan	1

Finals
Maki Sakai 8 dan	0
Naoki Hane 9 dan	1

Semifinals
Rin Kaiho Honorary Tengen	1
Satoshi Kataoka 9 dan	0
Nakano Hironari 9 dan	0
Takeshi Sakai 9 dan	1

Finals
Rin Kaiho Honorary Tengen	0
Takeshi Sakai 9 dan	1

== Main tournament ==
=== Winners section ===
Round of 16
Satoru Kobayashi 9 dan	1
So Yokoku 8 dan	0
Hiroshi Yamashiro 9 dan	0
Kim Shushun 7 dan	1
Takeshi Sakai 9 dan	0
Norimoto Yoda 9 dan	1
Koichi Kobayashi; Honorary Kisei	0
Keigo Yamashita Kisei	1
Cho U Gosei	1
Shinji Takao Meijin	0
Hideo Otake; Honorary Gosei	0
Hideki Komatsu 9 dan	1
Kimio Yamada 9 dan	1
Tomoyasu Mimura 9 dan	0
Naoki Hane 9 dan	0
O Rissei 9 dan	1

Quarter-finals
Satoru Kobayashi 9 dan	1
Kim Shushun 7 dan	0
Norimoto Yoda 9 dan	0
Keigo Yamashita Kisei	1
Cho U Gosei	1
Hideki Komatsu 9 dan	0
Kimio Yamada 9 dan	1
O Rissei 9 dan	0

Semi-finals
Satoru Kobayashi 9 dan	0
Keigo Yamashita Kisei	1
Cho U Gosei	1
Kimio Yamada 9 dan	0

Final
Keigo Yamashita Kisei	1
Cho U Gosei	0

=== Losers section ===
Semifinals
Shinji Takao Meijin	0
Cho U Gosei	1
Norimoto Yoda 9 dan	1
Kobayashi Satoru 9 dan	0

Finals
Cho U Gosei	0
Norimoto Yoda 9 dan	1

=== Challenger finals ===
Finals
1	Keigo Yamashita Kisei	1
2	Norimoto Yoda 9 dan	0

== Finals ==
Player	1 (Niigata)	2 (Gamagori)	3 (Ōmachi)	4 (Matsuyama)	5 (Chiyoda)	T
Cho Chikun (Judan)	W+R	B+2.5			B+3.5	3
Keigo Yamashita (Challenger)			B+R	W+R		2
