= 37th Tengen =

The 37th Tengen began on 7 July 2010. The winner of the challenger tournament will face title holder Yuki Satoshi in a best-of-five finals.

== Tournament ==
As of 26 June 2011

First round
Ogata Masaki	0
Murakawa Daisuke	1
Kono Rin	0
Yamada Takuji	1
Rin Kanketsu	0
Yamashita Keigo	1
Yamashiro Hiroshi	1
Hane Naoki	0
Yoda Norimoto	1
Kataoka Satoshi	0
Cho U	1
Sekiyama Toshimichi	0
Matsuoka Hideki	0
O Meien	1
Sakai Hideyuki	0
Kono Takashi	1
Mimura Tomoyasu	1
Shuto Shun	0
Furuya Yutaka	1
Matsumoto Takehisa	0
Yata Naoki	0
Iyama Yuta	1
Nakano Yasuhiro	1
Cho Riyu	0
Takahara Shuji	0
Miyazawa Goro	1
Kim Shushun	1
Kuwamoto Shinpei	0
Hikosaka Naoto	0
Komatsu Hideki	1
Goto Shungo	1
Oba Jyunya	0

Second round
Murakawa Daisuke	0
Yamada Takuji	1
Yamashita Keigo	1
Yamashiro Hiroshi	0
Yoda Norimoto	0
Cho U	1
O Meien	1
Kono Takashi	0
Mimura Tomoyasu	1
Furuya Yutaka	0
Iyama Yuta	1
Nakano Yasuhiro	0
Miyazawa Goro	0
Kim Shushun	1
Komatsu Hideki	1
Goto Shungo	0

Quarter-finals
Yamada Takuji	0
Yamashita Keigo	1
Cho U	0
O Meien	1
Mimura Tomoyasu	0
Iyama Yuta	1
Kim Shushun	1
Komatsu Hideki	0

Semi-finals
Yamashita Keigo	0
O Meien	1
Iyama Yuta
Kim Shushun

Final
O Meien

== Finals ==
Player	1	2	3	4	5	T
Yuki Satoshi (Tengen)
Challenger
