= 36th Meijin =

The 36th Meijin began league play on 2 December 2010 and concluded in October 2011. The defending champion was Iyama Yuta.

== Preliminary tournament ==
The preliminary tournament started on 5 August 2010. Takao Shinji, Cho U, Yuki Satoshi, Sakai Hideyuki, Mizokami Tomochika, and Cho Chikun retained their places in the league from the 35th Meijin. These players were joined by the winners of the preliminary tournament: Yamashita Keigo, Hane Naoki, and Rin Kanketsu.

Quarter-finals
5 August
Yamashita Keigo	1
Yoda Norimoto	0
26 August
Han Zenki	1
Mimura Tomoyasu	0
2 September
Seto Taiki	1
Fujii Shuya	0
9 September
Kono Rin	0
Ogata Masaki	1

Semi-finals
23 September
Yamashita Keigo	1
Han Zenki	0
23 September
Seto Taiki	1
Ogata Masaki	0

Final
21 October
Yamashita Keigo	1
Seto Taiki	0

Quarter-finals
19 August
Hane Naoki	1
Tsuruyama Atsushi	0
2 September
Murakawa Daisuke	1
Aragaki Takeshi	0
2 September
Kobayashi Satoru	1
Yukawa Mitsuhisa	0
9 September
Kataoka Satoshi	0
Yamada Kimio	1

Semi-finals
23 September
Hane Naoki	1
Murakawa Daisuke	0
30 September
Kobayashi Satoru	0
Yamada Kimio	0

Final
28 October
Hane Naoki	1
Yamada Kimio	0

Quarter-finals
19 August
Matsuoka Hideki	0
Kono Takashi	1
9 September
Ryu Shikun	0
Rin Kanketsu	1
5 August
Suzuki Shinji	0
Goto Shungo	1
26 August
Sakakibara Masaaki	0
O Meien	1

Semi-finals
30 September
Kono Takashi	0
Rin Kanketsu	1
7 October
Goto Shungo	0
O Meien	1

Final
28 October
Rin Kanketsu	1
O Meien	0

== League play ==
League play commenced on 2 December 2010 after the preliminaries. The winner of the league was Keigo Yamashita. Hideyuki Sakai, Cho Chikun, and Rin Kanketsu were eliminated from the league.

Player	T.S.	C.U.	Y.S.	S.H.	M.T.	C.C.	Y.K.	H.N.	R.K.	Record	Notes
Shinji Takao	–	W+4.5	X	W+R	B+R	W+0.5	X	X	B+R	5–3	
Cho U	X	–	W+0.5	X	X	B+4.5	W+R	B+R	W+4.5	5–3	
Satoshi Yuki	W+0.5	X	–	W+1.5	B+R	W+R	X	X	B+R	5–3	
Hideyuki Sakai	X	W+0.5	X	–	W+R	X	X	X	X	2–6	Eliminated
Tomochika Mizokami	X	B+2.5	X	X	–	W+R	X	1.5	X	3–5	
Cho Chikun	X	X	X	W+R	X	–	X	X	X	1–7	Eliminated
Keigo Yamashita	W+3.5	–	W+R	B+R	W+4.5	B+R	–	X	B+R	6–2	League winner
Naoki Hane	B+R	X	B+R	W+0.5	X	W+R	B+6.5	–	W+0.5	6–2	
Rin Kanketsu	X	X	X	B+4.5	W+0.5	B+R	X	X	–	3–5	Eliminated

== Finals ==
Player	1	2	3	4	5	6	7	T
Iyama Yuta Meijin		B+R			W+R			2
Dowa Yamashita Honinbo	B+5.5		B+R	W+R		W+3.5		4
