= 66th Honinbo =

2010–2011 Go tournament

The 66th Honinbo began league play on 7 October 2010 and completed on July 21, 2011. Title holder Yamashita Keigo retained his title over challenger Hane Naoki by a score of 4-3. Yamashita Keigo won the first three games, Hane Naoki the next three, and Yamashita Keigo the final game.

== Preliminary tournament ==
The preliminary tournament started on 8 April 2010. Hane Naoki, Iyama Yuta, Takao Shinji, and Cho U retained their place in the Honinbo league from the 65th Honinbo. These players were joined by the winners of the preliminary tournament: Cho Sonjin, Seto Taiki, O Rissei, and Kobayashi Satoru.

Quarter-finals
13 May
Yamashiro Hiroshi	1
Fujita Akihiko	0
27 May
Goto Shungo	0
Takashima Takeshi	1
20 May
Ohashi Hirofumi	0
Uchida Shuhei	1
27 May
Cho Sonjin	1
Yamada Kimio	0

Semi-finals
17 June
Yamashiro Hiroshi	1
Takashima Takeshi	0
1 July
Uchida Shuhei	0
Cho Sonjin	1

Final
12 August
Yamashiro Hiroshi	0
Cho Sonjin	1

Quarter-finals
13 May
Hoshino Masaki	0
Kataoka Satoshi	1
13 May
Obuchi Morito	1
Yasuda Yasutoshi	0
13 May
Yamada Noriyoshi	0
Akiyama Jiro	1
27 May
Seto Taiki	1
Mimura Tomoyasu	0

Semi-finals
10 June
Kataoka Satoshi	1
Obuchi Morito	0
24 June
Akiyama Jiro	0
Seto Taiki	1

Final
29 July
Kataoka Satoshi	0
Seto Taiki	1

Quarter-finals
13 May
Nakane Naoyuki	0
Nakano Hironari	1
3 June
Ogata Masaki	0
Kono Rin	1
20 May
O Rissei	1
Mochizuki Kenichi	0
27 May
Kamimura Haruo	0
Yuki Satoshi	1

Semi-finals
24 June
Nakano Hironari	0
Kono Rin	1
15 July
O Rissei	1
Yuki Satoshi	0

Final
2 September
Kono Rin	0
O Rissei	1

Quarter-finals
22 April
O Meien	0
Kobayashi Satoru	1
13 May
Shida Tatsuya	0
Ishida Atsushi	1
3 June
Mizokami Tomochika	0
Suzuki Shinji	1
13 May
Cho Chikun	1
Takemiya Masaki	0

Semi-finals
10 June
Kobayashi Satoru	1
Ishida Atsushi	0
24 June
Suzuki Shinji	1
Cho Chikun	0

Final
19 August
Kobayashi Satoru	1
Suzuki Shinji	0

== League play ==
League play commenced on 7 October after the preliminaries, which finished on 2 September. Hane Naoki, who lost the Honinbo title to Yamashita Keigo the year prior, won the right to challenge Keigo for the title.

Player	H.N.	I.Y.	T.S.	C.U.	O.R.	K.S.	C.S.	S.T.	Record	Notes
Hane Naoki	–	B+R	W+R	X	W+0.5	B+R	W+R	B+R	6–1	Challenger
Iyama Yuta	X	–	B+R	X	X	W+R	B+R	W+R	4–3	
Takao Shinji	X	X	–	B+1.5	X	X	W+R	X	2–5	Eliminated
Cho U	W+R	B+0.5	X	–	B+3.5	X	B+R	X	4–3	
O Rissei	X	W+R	B+R	X	–	X	X	B+R	3–4	Eliminated
Kobayashi Satoru	X	X	W+2.5	B+4.5	W+R	–	X	X	3–4	Eliminated
Cho Sonjin	X	X	X	X	B+R	W+11.5	–	X	2–5	Eliminated
Seto Taiki	X	X	W+R	B+R	X	B+3.5	W+R	–	4–3	

== Finals ==
Player	1	2	3	4	5	6	7	T
Yamashita Keigo (Honinbo)	W+7.5	B+R	W+1.5				W+4.5	4
Hane Naoki (Challenger)				W+0.5	B+R	W+7.5		3
