= 2007 in go =

== Calendar ==
The following events were scheduled to happen in 2007 regarding Go throughout the world.

=== January ===
- 4 - Gu Li Mingren defeats challenger Zhou Ruiyang by resignation in the first game of the 19th Mingren title to go up 1 game(s) to none.
- 6 - Gu Li Mingren defeats challenger Zhou Ruiyang by resignation in the second match of his title defense.
- 6 - Cho U defeats Lee Sedol by ½ point(s) in the first game of the 3rd ToyotaDenso World Oza.
- 6 - Rui Naiwei defeats Lee Daehyeoi by 5½ points in the first game of the 8th Female Myungin.
- 8 - Gu Li Mingren defeats challenger Zhou Ruiyang by resignation in the third and final match. This is Gu Li's ninth consecutive win in his title defenses of the Mingren.
- Lee Sedol beats Cho U by resignation in the second game of the ToyotaDenso World Oza to tie the series at 1-1.
- 9 - Lee Sedol wins the ToyotaDenso World Oza for the second time by defeating Cho U in the third and final match.
- 10 - Yun Junsang challenger of the Guksu defeats holder Lee Chang-ho by resignation in the opening match of the 50th edition of the tournament.
- 13 - Qiu Jun defeats Zhou Ruiyang by resignation in the final of the NEC Cup.
- 17-18 - Keigo Yamashita Kisei defeats Kobayashi Satoru by resignation in the first game of the 31st Kisei final. The match took place in Asahikawa, Hokkaidō.
- 19 - Gu Li defeats Kong Jie by resignation in the first game of the 3rd Chang-ki Cup final.
- 21 - Kong Jie defeats Gu Li by resignation in the second game of the 3rd Chang-ki Cup to even the score.
- 22 - First game of the Samsung Cup final between Lee Chang-ho and Chang Hao with Chang Hao coming out as the victor. The match took place in Shanghai, China.
- 24 - Second game of the Samsung Cup final between Lee Chang-ho and Chang Hao where Chang Hao won once more and took the title. The match took place in Shanghai, China.
- 25 - Park Jungsang defeats Lee Sedol by resignation in the first game of the Maxim Cup.
- 26 - Rui Naiwei defeats Lee Daehyeoi by resignation in the final of the Female Myungin and wins the title for the 7th time and 4th time in-a-row.
- 31 - Yun Junsang defeats Lee Chang-ho Guksu by ½ point(s) in the second game of the Guksu finals.

=== February ===
- 1 - Keigo Yamashita defeats Satoru Kobayashi by resignation in the second game of the Kisei final. The match was held in Nishimuro, Japan.
- 8 - Keigo Yamashita defeats Satoru Kobayashi by resignation in the third game of the Kisei final. The match was held in Aizuwakamatsu, Japan.
- 8 - Lee Sedol defeats Park Jungsang by resignation in the second game of the Maxim Cup.
- 9 - Lee Chang-ho defeats Gu Li by 2^{½} points to bring Team Korea to victory in the Nong Shim Cup over Team China. Team Korea has won the tournament each time except in 2006, when they lost to Team Japan in the final.
- 9 - An Choyoung defeats Paek Hongsuk by resignation in the first game of the Sibdang Cup.
- 10 - Paek Hongsuk defeats An Choyoung by resignation in the second game of the Sibdang Cup.
- 11 - An Choyoung defeats Paek Hongsuk by resignation to win the 2nd Sibdang Cup.
- 23 - Keigo Yamashita defeats Satoru Kobayashi by resignation in the fourth and final game of the Kisei finals. Keigo defends his Kisei title for another year. The match was held in Toyama, Japan.
- 24 - Lee Sedol defeats Park Jungsang by resignation in the third and final game of the Maxim Cup. This became the third time in a row Lee has won the Maxim Cup.

=== March ===
- 2 - Pak Yeong-hun Kisung defeats Choi Cheol-han by resignation in the first game of the 18th Kisung finals.
- 6 - Zhou Ruiyang defeats Wang Lei by 1^{½} points in the first game of the Xinren Wang finals.
- 8 - Zhou Ruiyang defeats Wang Lei by resignation in the second and final game of the Xinren Wang finals. This is the first title won by Zhou.
- 8 - Cho Chikun defeats Keigo Yamashita by resignation in the first game of the 45th Judan finals. The match took place in Niigata, Japan.
- 10 - Cho U defeats Shinji Takao by resignation in the final of the 26th NEC Cup.
- 12 - Lee Chang-ho defeats Yun Junsang by resignation in the third game of the Guksu finals. Lee Chang-ho still faces kadoban (one loss left).
- 16 - Yun Junsang wins the Guksu title by defeating Lee Chang-ho by resignation in the fourth game of the Guksu finals. Yun won the title 3 to 1.
- 18 - Cho Chikun Judan defeats Satoshi Yuki by 3^{½} points in the NHK Cup final. This is Cho's 70th career title.
- 18 - Chen Shien defeats Liu Yaowen by 6^{½} points in the first game of the CMC TV Cup finals.
- 19 - Zhou Junxun defeats Hu Yaoyu by resignation in the first game of the 11th LG Cup finals.
- 20 - Xia Daming defeats Lin Yuxiang by resignation in the first game of the New Star Match finals.
- 21 - Hu Yaoyu defeats Zhou Junxun by ^{½} a point in the second game of the 11th LG Cup finals.
- 22 - Zhou Junxun defeats Hu Yaoyu by ^{½} a point in the third game and final game of the 11th LG Cup finals. This is Zhou's first international title, and first by a Taiwanese professional.
- 23 - Gu Li defeats Chang Hao by ^{½} a point in the first game of the 6th Chunlan Cup finals.
- 24 - O Meien defeats Norimoto Yoda by 3^{½} points in the first game of the 2nd Daiwa Cup finals.
- 24 - Xia Daming defeats Lin Yuxiang by resignation in the second and final game of the New Star Match finals. This is Xia's first title.
- 25 - Gu Li defeats Chang Hao by resignation in the second and final game of the 6th Chunlan Cup finals. This is Gu Li's second international title, and second of the year.
- 25 - Chen Shien defeats Liu Yaowen resignation in the second and final game of the CMC TV Cup finals.
- 29 - Cho Chikun Judan defeats Keigo Yamashita by 2^{½} points in the second game of the 45th Judan finals. The match took place in Gamagori, Japan.
- 31 - O Meien defeats Norimoto Yoda by 9^{½} points in the second and final game of the Daiwa Cup finals.

=== April ===
- 1 - Hu Yaoyu defeats Chang Hao by resignation in the final of the Liguang Cup.
- 5 - Keigo Yamashita defeats Cho Chikun by resignation in the third game of the 45th Judan finals. The match took place in Ōmachi, Japan.
- 7 - Park Young-Hoon Kisung defeats Choi Cheol-han by 3^{½} points in the second and final game of the 18th Kisung finals.
- 12 - Won Seong-jin defeats Paek Hongsuk by resignation in the first game of the BC Card Cup finals.
- 18 - Gu Li Tianyuan defeats Liu Shizhen by resignation in the first game of the Tianyuan finals.
- 19 - Keigo Yamashita defeats Cho Chikun by resignation in the fourth game of the 45th Judan finals. The match took place in Matsuyama, Japan.
- 19 - Paek Hongsuk defeats Won Seong-jin by resignation in the second game of the BC Card Cup finals.
- 20 - Liu Shizhen defeats Gu Li by resignation in the second game of the Tianyuan finals.
- 21 - Gu Li Tianyuan defeats Liu Shizhen by resignation in the third and final game of the Tianyuan finals. Gu Li has now defended his title five times in a row.
- 25 - Cho Chikun defeats Keigo Yamashita by 3^{½} points in the fifth and final game of the 45th Judan finals. This is Cho's third consecutive Judan defense, and 71st career title.

=== May ===
- 1 - Won Seong-jin defeats Paek Hongsuk by 10^{½} points in the third and final game of the BC Card Cup finals.
- 11 - Shinji Takao defeats Norimoto Yoda by ^{½} a point in the first game of the 62nd Honinbo finals. The game was held in Tanabe, Wakayama, Japan.
- 16 - Piao Wenyao defeats Chen Yaoye by 9^{½} points in the final of the CCTV Cup. The CCTV Cup is Wenyao's first title.
- 23 - Norimoto Yoda defeats Shinji Takao by ^{½} a point in the second game of the 62nd Honinbo finals. The game was held in Jeju, South Korea.
- 25 - Yun Junsang defeats Lee Chang-ho by resignation in the first game of the 41st Wangwi finals.

=== June ===
- 7 - Shinji Takao defeats Norimoto Yoda by resignation in the third game of the 62nd Honinbo finals. The game was held in Gifu, Japan.
- 14 - Lee Sedol defeats Chen Yaoye by resignation in the final of the 19th Asian TV Cup. Sedol moved up to sixth on the all time Korean title win list, while Chen Yaoye was promoted to 9 dan at the age of 17, the youngest ever.
- 14 - Lee Chang-ho defeats Yun Junsang by ^{½} a point in the second game of the 41st Wangwi finals.
- 19 - Shinji Takao defeats Norimoto Yoda by 5^{½} points in the fourth game of the 62nd Honinbo finals. The game was held in Fukushima, Japan.
- 20 - Yun Junsang defeats Lee Chang-ho by 3^{½} points in the third game of the 41st Wangwi finals.
- 26 - Shinji Takao defeats Norimoto Yoda by 2^{½} points in the fifth and final game of the 62nd Honinbo finals. The game was held in Niigata, Japan.
- 27 - Lee Chang-ho defeats Yun Junsang by 1^{½} points in the fourth game of the 41st Wangwi finals.

=== July ===
- 18 - Lee Chang-ho defeats Yun Junsang by resignation in the fifth game of the 41st Wangwi finals.

== Major tournament standings ==
=== International ===
Tournament	Winner	Score	Runner-up
11th LG Cup	(Taiwan) Zhou Junxun	2-1	Hu Yaoyu (China)
12th LG Cup	—	—	—
20th Fujitsu Cup	—	—	—
6th Chunlan Cup	(China) Gu Li	2-0	Chang Hao (China)

=== Japan ===
Tournament	Holder	Score	Challenger
31st Kisei	Keigo Yamashita	4-0	Kobayashi Satoru
32nd Kisei	Keigo Yamashita	—	—
32nd Meijin	Cho U	4-3	Shinji Takao
—	—		
62nd Honinbo	Shinji Takao	4-1	Norimoto Yoda
63rd Honinbo	—	—	—
45th Judan	Cho Chikun	3-2	Keigo Yamashita
46th Judan	Cho Chikun	—	—
33rd Tengen	Rin Kono	—	—
55th Oza	Keigo Yamashita	—	—
32nd Gosei	Cho U	—	—

=== Korea ===
Tournament	Holder/ Winner	Score	Challenger/ Runner-up
12th GS Caltex Cup	Lee Sedol	—	—
41st Wangwi	Lee Chang-ho	3-2	Yun Junsang
50th Guksu	Lee Chang-ho	1-3	Yun Junsang
18th Kisung	Pak Yeong-hun	2-0	Choi Cheol-han
35th Myungin	—	—	—
2nd Sibdang Cup	An Choyoung	2-1	Paek Hongsuk
12th Chunwon	Cho Hanseung	—	—

=== China ===
Tournament	Holder/ Winner	Score	Challenger/ Runner-up
19th Mingren	Gu Li	3-0	Zhou Ruiyang
20th Mingren	Gu Li	—	—
21st Tianyuan	Gu Li	2-1	Liu Shizhen
3rd Chang-ki Cup	Kong Jie	2-1	Gu Li

=== Taiwan ===
Tournament	Holder	Score	Challenger
6th Tianyuan	Zhou Junxun	—	—
3rd Guoshou	Chen Shien	—	—
