= 59th Ōza =

Japanese Go tournament

The 59th Ozā was the 2011 iteration of one of the big seven professional Go tournaments held in Japan. Beginning on 13 January 2011, the preliminary tournament began with a single knockout round of 16 players. The winner of the preliminary tournament, Hane Naoki, then faced the previous year's title-holder, Taiwanese Go player Cho U, over 3 days of play, resulting in 0–3 in favour of U.

== Challenger Tournament ==
Round of 16
28 April
Hane Naoki	1
Kobayashi Satoru	0
19 May
Yoda Norimoto	0
Cho Chikun	1
12 May
So Yokoku	0
Murakawa Daisuke	1
14 April
Mitani Tetsuya	1
Mochizuki Kenichi	0
14 April
Iyama Yuta	1
Imamura Toshiya	0
12 May
Matsumoto Takehisa	0
Nakano Yasuhiro	1
21 April
Yamashiro Hiroshi	0
Yamashita Keigo	1
21 April
Yamada Kimio	1
Kono Rin	0

Quarter-finals
30 May
Hane Naoki	1
Cho Chikun	0
9 June
Murakawa Daisuke	0
Mitani Tetsuya	1
9 June
Iyama Yuta	1
Nakano Yasuhiro	0
19 May
Yamashita Keigo	0
Yamada Kimio	1

Semi-finals
20 June
Hane Naoki	1
Mitani Tetsuya	0
14 July
Iyama Yuta	1
Yamada Kimio	0

Final
8 September
Hane Naoki	1
Iyama Yuta	0

== Finals ==
Player	1	2	3	4	5	T
Cho U (Oza)	1	1	1	-	-
Hane Naoki; Challenger	0	0	0	-	-
Win by	3.5	1.5	Resignation	-	-
Location	Tokyo	Hyogo	Yamagata	(Kanagawa)	(Shizuoka)

== See also ==
- List of professional Go tournaments
- Go players
- List of Go organizations
