= 18th Agon Cup =

The 18th Agon Cup began on 21 April 2011 – 1 October 2011. Two Korean amateur players were invited to the preliminaries, with both qualifying. Ha Sungbong defeated professionals Yanigasawa Satoshi and Furuya Yutaka. Kim Sungjin defeated 25th Honinbo and Japan's top title holder Cho Chikun. He also defeated Kato Atsushi. In the main tournament, he was knocked out by Iyama Yuta Meijin in the first round. Iyama Yuta came out as the winner. He beat Yamashita Keigo at the final. The winner's prize was ¥10,000,000.

== Tournament ==
Round of 16
23 June
Mizokami Tomochika
Ha Sungbong (A)	B+R
4 July
Takao Shinji
Yamashita Keigo	W+R
23 June
Cho U	B+1.5
Shida Tatsuya
16 June
Kim Shushun	B+R
Nakano Hironari
23 June
Ryu Shikun
Yamada Kimio	W+R
30 June
O Meien	B+0.5
Sakai Hideyuki
2 June
Iyama Yuta	B+R
Kim Sungjin (A)
9 June
Cho Sonjin
Yuki Satoshi	W+1.5

Quarter-finals
25 July
Ha Sungbong
Yamashita Keigo	W+R
14 July
Cho U
Kim Shushun	B+R
21 July
Yamada Kimio	W+R
O Meien
18 July
Iyama Yuta	B+0.5
Yuki Satoshi

Semi-finals
25 August
Yamashita Keigo	B+R
Kim Shushun
4 August
Yamada Kimio
Iyama Yuta	B+R

Final
1 October
Yamashita Keigo
Iyama Yuta	B+R
