= 36th Gosei =

The 36th Gosei began on 12 May 2010 – 29 August 2010. Hane Naoki won the challenger tournament and faced title holder Sakai Hideyuki in a best-of-five final to decide the winner. Sakai Hideyuki won the first two games, but Hane Naoki fought back and won the last three games, thus became the new title holder. The winner's prize was ¥8,000,000.

== Tournament ==
Round of 16
20 January
Rin Kanketsu	0
Imamura Yoshiaki	1
17 February
Yamashiro Hiroshi	0
Rin Shien	1
6 January
Shuto Shun	0
Yamashita Keigo	1
24 January
Mizokami Tomochika	0
O Meien	1
6 January
Cho Chikun	1
Han Zenki	0
9 December
Cho U	1
Nakamura Hidehito	0
16 December
Hashimoto Yujiro	0
Iyama Yuta	1
13 January
Chin Kaei	0
Hane Naoki	1

Quarter-finals
7 April
Imamura Yoshiaki	0
Rin Shien	1
24 March
Yamashita Keigo	1
O Meien	0
28 March
Cho Chikun	1
Cho U	1
20 January
Iyama Yuta	0
Hane Naoki

Semi-finals
28 April
Rin Shien	1
Yamashita Keigo	0
14 April
Cho Chikun	0
Hane Naoki	1

Final
19 May
Rin Shien	0
Hane Naoki	1

== Finals ==
Player	1	2	3	4	5	T
Sakai Hideyuki (Gosei)	W+R	B+1.5				2
Hane Naoki (Challenger)			B+3.5	W+6.5	W+R	3
