= 29th Meijin =

The 29th Meijin was the 29th Meijin tournament of the board game go. The tournament was held in 2004 in Japan and was won by Cho U.

== Challenger Group ==
Players	1	2	3	4	5	6	7	8	9	T
Yamashita Keigo	X	Won	Won	Loss	Won	Won	Loss	Loss	Loss	4
Rin Kaiho	Loss	X	Loss	Loss	Won	Loss	Won	Won	Loss	3
Cho U - C	Loss	Won	X	Won	Won	Loss	Won	Won	Won	6
O Rissei	Won	Won	Loss	X	Loss	Won	Loss	Loss	Loss	3
Cho Chikun	Loss	Loss	Loss	Won	X	Loss	Loss	Loss	Loss	1
O Meien	Loss	Won	Won	Loss	Won	X	Loss	Loss	Won	4
Kobayashi Satoru - C	Won	Loss	Loss	Won	Won	Won	X	Won	Won	6
Imamura Toshiya	Won	Loss	Loss	Won	Won	Won	Loss	X	Won	5
Yamada Kimio	Won	Won	Loss	Won	Won	Loss	Loss	Loss	X	4

== Challenger Final ==
Players	Final
Kobayashi Satoru	Cho U
Cho U	Cho U

== Final ==
Players	1	2	3	4	5	6	7	T
Cho U	Loss	Won	Loss	Won	Won	Won	N.P	4
Yoda Norimoto (Meijin)	Won	Loss	Won	Loss	Loss	Loss	N.P	2
