= Igo Masters Cup =

Japanese Go competition

The Igo Masters Cup was a Japanese Go competition. It was held nine times from 2011 until 2019, when it was discontinued. The tournament sponsor was Fumakilla, a chemical manufacturing company.

== Outline ==
The tournament was open only to players over the age of 50 and who have won at least one Top 7 title (Kisei, Meijin, Honinbo, Tengen, Oza, Judan, Gosei). The format was single knockout and each player was allotted two hours thinking time. The winners' purse was 5 million Yen ($62,000), while the runner-up received 1.5 million yen.

== Past winners and runners-up ==
Year	Winner	Runner-up
2011	Cho Chikun	Kobayashi Koichi
2012	O Meien	Cho Chikun
2013	Kobayashi Satoru	Ishii Kunio
2014	Cho Chikun	Kobayashi Satoru
2015	Cho Chikun	Takemiya Masaki
2016	Kobayashi Koichi	Awaji Shuzo
2017	Kobayashi Satoru	Cho Chikun
2018	Yoda Norimoto	Kataoka Satoshi
2019	Cho Chikun	Komatsu Hideki
