= 11th LG Cup =

The 11th LG Cup professional Go tournament was held in 2006 and 2007 and was won by Zhou Junxun. It featured:

- 13 players from South Korea - Cho Han-seung, Cho Hun-hyun, Choi Cheol-han, Choi Myung-hoon, Hong Min-pyo, Jin Siyoung, Kim Dong-hee, Ko Geuntae, Lee Chang-ho, Lee Se-dol, Park Seung-hyun, Park Yeong-hun, Yun Jun-sang
- 11 players from People's Republic of China - Chang Hao, Chen Yaoye, Ding Wei, Gu Li, Hu Yaoyu, Huang Yizhong, Wang Lei, Wang Xi, Xie He, Yu Bin, Zhou Heyang
- 6 players from Japan - Cho Chikun, Ko Iso, Kono Rin, So Yokoku, Takao Shinji, Yamashita Keigo
- 2 players from Taiwan - Lin Zhihan, Zhou Junxun

Two of the 30 players were given automatic berths: Gu Li, who won the 10th LG Cup, and runner up for the 10th LG Cup, Chen Yaoye.

== Tournament ==
Round of 16
15 May 2006 - Seoul
(China) Gu Li (Holder)	1
(South Korea) Park Yeong-hun	0
15 May 2006 - Seoul
(South Korea) Ko Geuntae	1
(China) Wang Xi	0
15 May 2006 - Seoul
(Taiwan) Lin Zhihan	1
(Japan) So Yokoku	0
15 May 2006 - Seoul
(China) Zhou Heyang	0
(South Korea) Hong Min-pyo	1
15 May 2006 - Seoul
(Japan) Ko Iso	0
(Taiwan) Zhou Junxun	1
15 May 2006 - Seoul
(China) Wang Lei	0
(Japan) Takao Shinji	1
15 May 2006 - Seoul
(South Korea) Lee Se-dol	1
(China) Chang Hao	0
15 May 2006 - Seoul
(China) Xie He	1
(South Korea) Jin Siyoung	0

Quarter-finals
17 May 2006 - Seoul
Gu Li	1
Ko Geuntae	0
17 May 2006 - Seoul
Lin Zhihan	0
Hong Min-pyo	1
17 May 2006 - Seoul
Zhou Junxun	1
Takao Shinji	0
17 May 2006 - Seoul
Lee Se-dol	0
Xie He	1

Semi-finals
31 October 2006 - Pusan
Gu Li	0
Hong Min-pyo	0
30 October 2006 - Pusan
Zhou Junxun	1
Xie He	0

Final
13 February 2007 - Pusan
Hong Min-pyo	0
Zhou Junxun	1

Round of 16
15 May 2006 - Seoul
(China) Ding Wei	0
(South Korea) Kim Dong-hee	1
15 May 2006 - Seoul
(South Korea) Choi Cheol-han	0
(China) Chen Yaoye (Runner up)	1
15 May 2006 - Seoul
(South Korea) Choi Myung-hoon	0
(China) Yu Bin	1
15 May 2006 - Seoul
(Japan) Cho Chikun	0
(South Korea) Cho Han-seung	1
15 May 2006 - Seoul
(South Korea) Lee Chang-ho	1
(China) Huang Yizhong	0
15 May 2006 - Seoul
(Japan) Kono Rin	1
(South Korea) Park Seung-hyun	0
15 May 2006 - Seoul
(South Korea) Cho Hun-hyun	0
(China) Hu Yaoyu	1
15 May 2006 - Seoul
(South Korea) Yun Jun-sang	0
(Japan) Yamashita Keigo	1

Quarter-finals
17 May 2006 - Seoul
Kim Dong-hee	0
Chen Yaoye	1
17 May 2006 - Seoul
Yu Bin	0
Cho Han-seung	1
17 May 2006 - Seoul
Lee Chang-ho	1
Kono Rin	0
17 May 2006 - Seoul
Hu Yaoyu	1
Yamashita Keigo	0

Semi-finals
30 October 2006 - Pusan
Chen Yaoye	0
Cho Han-seung	1
31 October 2006- Pusan
Lee Chang-ho	0
Hu Yaoyu	0

Final
12 February 2007 - Pusan
Cho Han-seung	0
Hu Yaoyu	1

== Finals ==
Player	1	2	3	T
(Taiwan) Zhou Junxun; 9 dan	W+R		B+0.5	2
(China) Hu Yaoyu; 9 dan		B+0.5		1

Key

- W+R - White won by resignation
- B+0.5 - Black won by 0.5 points
