= Cho Chikun =

Professional go player

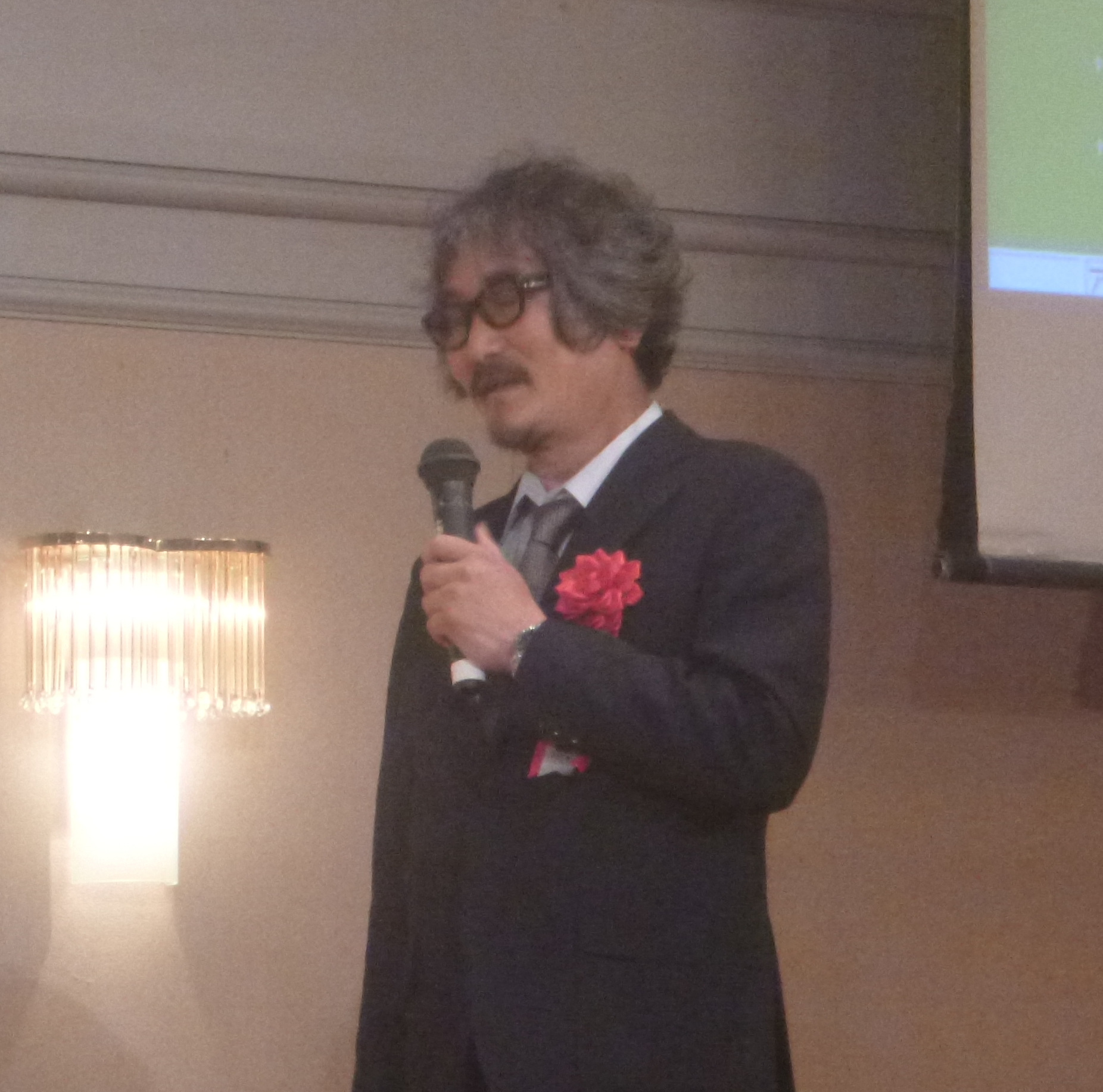

Personal information
- Native name: 趙治勲 (Japanese); ちょう ちくん (Japanese); 조치훈 (Korean); 趙治勳 (Korean); Jo Chihun (Revised Romanization); Cho Ch'ihun (McCune–Reischauer)
- Born: June 20, 1956 (age 70) Busan, South Korea

Sport
- Turned pro: 1968
- Teacher: Minoru Kitani
- Pupil: Kim kwang-sik, Kim Shushun, Matsumoto Takehisa, Atsushi Tsuruyama
- Rank: 9 dan
- Affiliation: Nihon Ki-in

Cho Chikun 25th Honinbo Honorary Meijin (Korean: 조치훈; born June 20, 1956) is a professional Go player and a nephew of Cho Namchul. Born in Busan, South Korea, he is affiliated to Nihon Ki-in. His total title tally of 75 titles is the most in the history of the Japanese Nihon Ki-in. Cho is the first player to hold the top three titles—Kisei, Meijin, and Honinbo—simultaneously which he did for three years in a row. Cho is the first in history to win all of the "Top 7" titles in Japan (Kisei, Meijin, Honinbo, Judan, Tengen, Oza, and Gosei) which he achieved by winning the Oza in 1994. Cho U in 2011 and Iyama Yuta in 2013 would duplicate this feat, both by winning the Kisei. He is also one of the 'Six Supers' Japanese players that were most celebrated in the late twentieth century, along with Rin Kaiho, Otake Hideo, Takemiya Masaki, Kato Masao and his classmate and arch-rival Kobayashi Koichi. He is the author of several books on Go.

== The beginning (1962–1967) ==
Cho was born into a very rich family of six children. His grandfather was a bank director. During the Korean War, the money the family had owned was burnt and they became impoverished. His father then sought the advice of a fortune teller. Originally called Pung-yeon, Cho's name was changed to Chihun, as the fortune teller told him to change his son's name to Chihun or else his mother would die, also saying that following the change, Chihun's younger brother would die but Chihun would become famous. Both predictions proved accurate.

His grandfather taught him Go when he was young. Seeing great talent in Cho, his father sent him to Japan in 1962. His rise to becoming one of the greatest Go players began when he joined Minoru Kitani's Go school. He was accompanied by his uncle Cho Namchul and his brother Cho Shoen on his way to the Haneda airport in Japan in August 1962. He was only six years old at the time. At the airport he met Minoru Kitani and his wife, another pupil Kobayashi Chizu, and the master's daughter, Reiko Kitani (who as an adult married Cho's future rival Koichi Kobayashi). The day after arriving in Japan Cho beat Rin Kaiho in a five stone handicap game at a party held at the Kitani School to celebrate the total dan ranks of Kitani students reaching a sum of 100. A large crowd watched intensely, as if it were a professional game.

Cho enrolled at the Nihon Ki-in as an insei when he was only seven. He was bullied by many other students for being Korean. He started to become annoyed since he was the Kitanis' "baby". He was known to be lax in his studies, which could be clearly seen when his future rival Koichi Kobayashi joined the Kitani school. Kobayashi was not as strong, but he studied much harder than Cho.

== Breakthrough to shodan (1968–1972) ==
Cho broke through to shodan after beating Michihiko Azuma in May 1968. He became one of the youngest professionals ever in modern go history, at 11 years and 8 months. In the same year, he was promoted to 2 dan and was looking very promising. Within a mere two years, he climbed to 4 dan after winning almost every Oteai game possible. He reached 5 dan in 1971, at just 15 years of age.

In 1972, the Go Review and Kido Yearbook released information on Cho Chihun. His name was well known before he was even allowed to drive. Although he had a great record of thirty wins and only six losses in this year, he lost twice to his rival Koichi Kobayashi in big tournaments—first the 4th Shin-Ei, which was even televised, and in the final of the 16th Prime Minister Cup. After a rocky start, Cho gained momentum, beating three top players, until he lost to Rin Kaiho, who was Meijin at the time, in the 9th Asahi Pro Best Ten tournament.

== Victories and defeats (1973–1979) ==
Cho won the 5th Shin-Ei after beating Yasumasa Hane, who was an 8 dan at the time. Second prize was awarded to him after scoring an 83.75% winning percentage in the 5+ dan Oteai. He then took tenth place in the 11th Asahi Pro Best Ten tournament. He was also promoted to 6 dan in 1973 with a good record of 30 wins and 11 losses.

His most significant accomplishment of 1974 was qualifying for the 22nd Nihon Ki-in Championship, especially since this came after being beaten out of the Honinbo preliminaries by Takaho Kojima. He beat Kazuo Sometani, Masao Kato, Yoshio Ishida, and Rin Kaiho. His win against Ishida was something strange, as it came a week after Ishida achieved Meijin-Honinbo. He didn't make it past the second game in the 18th Prime Minister Cup, which again went to Kobayashi. He then took revenge on Kobayashi by beating him in the 6th Shin-Ei. He was awarded a Special Merit Prize by Kido magazine after his most impressive record thus far of 33 wins and 9 losses.

His career skyrocketed when Kido magazine named him the Number One Young Player. His power and composure shone through his strong endgame. He barely lost out in the final of the 22nd Nihon Ki-In Championship to Eio Sakata after making a critical mistake that led to his resignation. This loss fueled him to take the 12th Asahi Pro Best Ten undefeated, which made him look incredibly powerful, as all the opponents were 9-dan. The victory made him the youngest title holder ever in Japan. He lost in the second round of the 30th Honinbo preliminary to Toshihiro Shimamura 9-dan. Even though he had a second chance to take the match against Masao Kato—due to a triple ko—he still lost. He was on a roll in the 1st Tengen league, until he was defeated by Shuzo Ohira. He didn't get far in the rest of the tournaments that year. His spirits were high after he was promoted to 7 dan in late October, only to be crushed a month later when his teacher, Kitani, died. His record was a formidable 39 wins and 16 losses for the year.

1976 was a year of change, especially for Cho. Having to cope with the loss of his teacher, he regained his power and went on to having a very successful year. He began the year by winning the 1st Asahi Top Eight Players tournament. Then the title system was greatly altered—the Asahi Pro Best Ten and Top Eight Players tournaments were disbanded, being replaced by the Kisei and Gosei tournaments. This was unfortunate for Cho, since he couldn't defend his first 2 titles. The Tengen was enhanced after the Nihon Ki-in Championship was combined with the Kansai Ki-in Championship. Now along with the new year, Cho had to win new titles. He won a place in the 2nd Meijin league this year, before failing to get into the 32nd Honinbo league. The hard start of the year got only worse after losing in the 2nd round of the Tengen, and losing in the preliminaries for the 1st Gosei. Things started looking up after he reached the semi-final of the 20th Prime Minister Cup, only to fall after losing in the 2nd round of the 1st Shinjin-O. He then went back to his old self, getting four wins in a row to reach the 26th Oza final. He went on to win his first Oza title, beating Hideo Otake 2–1. He reached the 15th Judan challenger final, where he lost to Eio Sakata. Although having a not so great record in tournaments, he won prizes from Kido for having the highest number of wins (46) and for having the best technique. Along with the 46 wins, he lost 18 times.

1977 was a bad year for Cho. He lost in the preliminaries of the 2nd Meijin league, the 15th Judan, and the 16th Judan. He then lost his only title, the Oza, in November. The only tournament he would win this year was the 8th Shin-Ei, which was followed by another loss to rival Kobayashi in the 2nd Shinjin-O final.

Cho looked much better in 1978. He won the 7-dan section of the 3rd Kisei before being promoted to 8 dan in the summer. He took 3rd place in the Meijin League. Even through some success of the year, he still couldn't make it through the preliminaries of the 33rd Honinbo. He participated in the 16th Judan, the 3rd Tengen, and the 26th Oza preliminaries.

1979 was a year of change for Cho. He finally broke through to the 34th Honinbo finals before doing okay in the 16th Judan and 3rd Tengen leagues. He took the 4th Gosei league and title in August. The year ended on a high, after getting the best Oteai score of the year.

== Achieving the peak of his career (1980–1981) ==
He might have lost his newly won Gosei title, but he won what he was after: the Meijin title. Coincidentally, he won the title from Hideo Otake, who had taken Cho's Gosei the same year. There are rumors that said that Cho vowed that after moving to Japan, he wouldn't return to South Korea until the Meijin title was his. He made his first trip home on the New Year holiday in 1980 at the age of 24. He was a national hero in Korea now. He even played two games with Korean champion Cho Hunhyun. One was a quick Go game, while the other spanned an almost 18 hours over two days. Cho Chikun won both games. After losing both games, Cho Hunhyun vowed that he'd never lose to Cho Chikun again. From 1981 to 2003, Cho Hunhyun never lost to Chikun in all the games they played.

The beginning of the year issue of Kido Magazine had a table of statistics. A summary of his career are shown below.

Year	Tournament	Oteai	Total
1968	4–3	8–4	12–7
1969	18–6	9–3	27–9
1970	14–5	9–0–1	23–5–1
1971	20–5	9–0–1	29–5–1
1972	22–6	8–0	30–6
1973	23–10	7–1	30–11
1974	28–7	5–2	33–9
1975	33–14–1	6–2	39–16–1
1976	41–15	5–3	46–18
1977	28–20	5–3	33–23
1978	29–13	7–1	36–14
1979	34–12	5–1	39–13
1980	38–19	*	38–19

- ^{Did not participate in Oteai due to reaching 9 dan. 9 dan players do not participate in the Oteai.}

== Champion of Japanese Go (1981–1985) ==
Cho won the Honinbo for the first time in 1981. He won the Honinbo league undefeated with a score of 7 wins and 0 losses. His campaign was the first time someone won the Honinbo league undefeated. Things looked like they would be going Cho's way after finishing the year with 36 wins and 10 losses.

Along with his Meijin and Honinbo, he added another title to his collection—the Judan title. The Meijin title was held by Cho for the third year in a row. He also defended his Honinbo title, winning 3 games in a row to beat Kobayashi. He also made it into the final of the Kisei. The year ended on another high. 34 wins and 13 losses was the record this year.

=== The 7th Kisei ===
Being up 3–0 in the Kisei final, it looked like Fujisawa Shuko would run away with the title – for a seventh time in a row. Cho left many flabbergasted after coming back to win three games to tie it at three a piece. It looked like Shuko had won the seventh game, but he made one of his famous blunders (poka) and Cho won again. Cho was the first to hold the top four titles of Kisei, Meijin, Honinbo, and Judan. All the titles were of top order, but he would only hold all of them for forty days. He lost all the titles except the Meijin, but set a record. He was the first player in history to hold the Meijin title for four years in a row. The year could have been better, as he ended with 28 wins and 22 losses.

Cho (white) beating Fujisawa in Game 5 of the 1983 Kisei.

Cho won the 8th Kisei title, defending it against Rin Kaiho. For the fourth time in 5 years, Cho faced Otake Hideo in the Meijin final. He went down 3 games again, only to win 4 straight games and defend his Meijin for the 5th time. His results would have to be called a success, he failed once more to make the Honinbo League.

The Kisei title was defended by Cho in 1985. It went all the way, through all 7 games. There was a dramatic final where Takemiya Masaki had a huge moyo that was 120 points big. Cho was lucky, as his corners and side territory led him to a 1.5 point win. At the same time he had happiness, there was sadness as Kobayashi took the Meijin title which Cho had held for 5 years.

== Car accident (1986) ==
A cataclysmic event for Chikun happened at the beginning of 1986. At around lunch time on January 6, 1986, Cho was leaving in his car when a motorcyclist came around from his blind spot. He had avoided Cho's car, only to have slid and overturned on his motorcycle. Cho was helping the motorcyclist to stand up, and then he went to pick the bike up when a car hit him. His right thigh was broken and he suffered other injuries. He was sent into the emergency room and had an operation the day after. The injuries would take three months to heal. Cho was determined not to let it affect him. Since his head and hand were fine, he went ahead and played the first game of the Kisei tournament. He played a good game, only to lose by 2.5 points. Cho recovered from the loss and took the next two games. Kobayashi then took 3 in a row and Cho was without a title for the first time in 8 years—something tremendous, considering he was only 29 years old. He went on to lose in a playoff for the Meijin, only to end the year with winning the Gosei title. This year ended better than last with a record of 35 wins and 17 losses.

== Gains and losses of titles (1987–1990) ==
Cho lost his Gosei title in 1987 to friend Masao Kato. He also lost out on challenging for the Oza. Although losing out on two titles, he would win the Tengen from Kobayashi. The Tengen had a bigger prize than the Gosei and Oza, adding on the fact that Kobayashi is Cho's biggest rival is satisfaction for Cho. His record for the year was 40 wins and 23 losses.

1988 was showing small signs of an old Cho, adding inconsistency. He won the Judan from Kato and defended his Tengen. He started winning titles again before losing to Nie Weiping in the Ing Cup—28 wins and 18 losses this year.

Cho ended the year with two titles just like last. He went on to the Honinbo title, then lost the Tengen against the same person that he took the Honinbo from Rin Kaiho. Cho was happy to win the Honinbo once more, but Kobayashi still held to Kisei and Meijin titles, which Cho desired to take away from his rival. His record for this year was 29 wins and 18 losses.

In another unspectacular year, Cho lost the Judan to Takemiya but defended the Honinbo. Both matches would be decided in the last game. He held strong against rival Kobayashi but couldn't find an opening to beat Takemiya. Another average record of 26 wins and 20 losses.

== 1991–2001 ==
Cho defended the Honinbo title once more, which would lead to him defending it again and again until 1999. He did terribly (in Cho terms) due to not making it through to the Meijin. In the same year, more international tournaments come to be. These include the Tong Yang Cup and the Fujitsu Cup. Cho wasn't very successful in these, winning only one in 1991, the Fujitsu Cup. He lucked out in the 1991 Fujitsu Cup because his opponent Qian Yuping had health issues to pay attention to and couldn't compete in the final. He lost the Judan once more and lost the play-off of the Kisei. His record looked better when he ended with 30 wins and 17 losses. 1992 was nothing special. The only events to note are his defending of the Honinbo and losing the semi-final of the Ing Cup. Remnants of the old Cho were coming back with his 31–16 record.

=== The 47th Honinbo ===
Cho made another miraculous comeback, this time in 1992 against his biggest rival Kobayashi Koichi in the Honinbo. Kobayashi had challenged for the Honinbo in 1990 and 1991, but Cho was too stubborn to give it up. Cho had come back in both finals, being down 3 games to 1, but pulled back 3 wins to defend the Honinbo. In 1991, he was down 2 to 0 in 1990, then won 4 games in a row to defend once more. In 1992, it was even more unbelievable. Cho was losing 3 games to 0, but was so relentless, that he came back and won 4 straight games once more to take the Honinbo away from Kobayashi's grip. This certainly showed that Cho could come back from any deficit and win again.

1993 was the fifth year in a row Cho would hold the Honinbo. He would get far into the Tong Yang Cup, losing to Lee Chang-ho in the final. He then became a challenger in the Kisei. A good record once more, 26 wins and 13 losses is how this year ended. He won the Kisei once more, along with defending the Honinbo again. He then won the Oza for the first time in 17 years. Cho was back to his old ways, ending the year with 33 wins and 19 losses. Cho made a big mistake in the Kisei final of 1995 and lost the title. He ran away with his defense of the Honinbo for the 7th year in a row. The Oza was taken away by O Rissei, who swept Cho with a 3–0 win. The end of the year was good for Cho, winning back the Kisei—another average record of 31 wins and 25 losses. 1996 is when he held the Triple Crown once more. It was a tiring year for Cho. He played 62 tournament games, 45 of which he won. It was a truly amazing record, 45 wins and 17 losses. He kept the Triple Crown for another year. The second time, he ended with a 26–13 record. He defended his Triple Crown again with a record of 28 wins and 21 losses for the year. He finally lost his Honinbo title unexpectedly in 1999. He tried to win the Oza, but failed against a powerful O Rissei—an acceptable record with 31 wins and 21 losses. He crumbled in 2000, losing all his titles.

The deciding game of the 47th Honinbo.

=== The 25th Meijin ===
He lost his most prized title, the Meijin, to Norimoto Yoda in 2000. Cho made his infamous comment during this time. The final was held in Amsterdam, where he was asked by a Dutch reporter why he loved Go so much. Cho replied "I hate Go". He continued saying that it was too tiring and tense for him. This led to his habit of ruffling his hair or constantly moving about. He became even more discouraged when he was no match for Yoda, losing 4 games to 0.

He finished the year with just one title, the NEC Cup. An average record of 29 wins and 29 losses. It was strange that Cho started a year without any big titles, that it even led to him being entitled the 25th Honinbo. He came close to becoming the challenger in all of the three big titles this year. He defended the NEC Cup and won the 34th Hayago Championship along with the Oza. Another tiring year for Cho, ending with 47 wins and 20 losses.

=== 34th Hayago championship ===
Cho competed in 34th edition of the Hayago Championship in 2002. His campaign started against Naoki Hane. Taking black, Cho passed Hane by 5.5 points, Yoda being his next opponent. Cho beat Yoda by resignation while holding white. In the semi-finals, his opponent was O Meien, who he beat by resignation also. The final match was against Cho's biggest rival Koichi Kobayashi. He won the match by 6.5 points, and it became his 62nd title.

== 2002–2005 ==
=== 35th Hayago championship ===
Cho competed in what would be the final edition of the Hayago Championship. Being the last year's winner, Cho was given an automatic berth into the second round. His first match was against his opponent for the final the year before, Koichi Kobayashi. Cho beat him by resignation, before moving on and beating Yasuhiro Nakano by resignation also. In both games he held white. In the final, he faced Yoshio Ishida. Taking black, Cho won by resignation after just 187 moves. This became Cho's 65th and record breaking title. The record of 64 career titles was previously held by Eio Sakata, and was finally broken after 27 years.

=== 9th Agon Cup ===
In the middle of 2002, Cho started in the 9th Agon Cup. He had never won the tournament before, but had a good record in hayago tournaments (16 hayago titles to date). At the time, Cho was holding the Oza title. His first match was against Shuzo Awaji, who he beat by resignation, holding white. His second match would be against fellow Minoru Kitani student Yoshio Ishida. Taking black, Cho won by 4.5 points. The third match saw Cho taking black again, beating O Rissei by resignation. His final match was against Cho U. This time taking white, Cho won by resignation. The 9th Agon Cup was his 66th title, and first time winning the title.

=== The 50th Oza Match ===
In this match, Cho was ahead and was determined not to let anything stop him from beating O Meien. It was move 145, and both players were in overtime. To Cho's surprise, the referee of the match, Kentaro Yamamato started counting down the seconds for Cho's move. Cho had not noticed that it was his move from all the intense concentration of making the right move. He was saddened, greatly. He kept asking himself "Why?". He would keep repeating to Yamamoto, "Was it my turn?". After the incident, Cho left the room, weeping. The referees finally decided that Cho in fact had lost, while on the board he was ahead. 39–26 was the record for 2002.

=== 8th Samsung Cup ===
2003 was the year of the Samsung Cup. It was his first big title in three years. Cho was known for not doing well in international tournaments, so when he progressed to the quarter-finals of the 8th Samsung Cup, many were surprised. The only time before the Samsung Cup in which he won an international cup was back in 1991 when he won the Fujitsu Cup because his opponent, Qian Yuping, fell ill. The quarter-final was a historical game for Cho, as it was the first time he beat Cho Hunhyun since 1981. The final four were left now. Other than Cho, the other players who were Hu Yaoyu, Xie He, and Park Young-Hoon. All were under the age of 21, while Cho was 47 at the time. In the semi-final, in which pairings were selected by lot, he played Hu Yaoyu. He was lucky, winning by only half a point. Park had beaten Xie He, so Cho and Park met in the final. Park won the first game by 4 and a half points, but Cho came back and took the next two games. The last game was clearly worse for Cho until Park slipped up on move 180 and Cho was able to cut off a lot of stones. This led to Park resigning. Cho won his first international title in 12 years, and only his second of all time.

The deciding game of the 8th Samsung Cup.

=== JAL Super Hayago championship ===
In 2003, Cho competed in the JAL Super Hayago Championship. He wasn't very successful, losing in his first match to Naoki Hane by resignation.

In 2004, Cho competed in the JAL Super Hayago Championship again. It was the second edition of the tournament. This time Cho started off on a high note, beating Shigeaki Yokota by resignation, before beating Yokota's fellow Kansai Ki-in player and current title holder Satoshi Yuki. Cho had also beaten Yuki by resignation. In his third match, taking black, he beat old friend Masao Kato by 2 and a half points. The final was against Tomoyasu Mimura. This time taking white, Cho beat Mimura by resignation. This was Cho's 67th title, and first time winning the tournament.

=== 43rd Judan ===
Cho found himself in the Judan once more, this time 14 years after his last bid as challenger in 1991 against Masaki Takemiya (Cho lost 3–2). Cho found himself in a league with old friends and rivals, including Masao Kato, Rin Kaiho, and Yoda Norimoto. The league also included young guns Cho U, Shinji Takao, and Keigo Yamashita. Keeping this in mind, it was not going to be an easy campaign for Cho. His first match was against Yujiro Hashimoto. Cho, holding black, won the match by resignation. In his next match, he found himself against another young powerhouse, Kimio Yamada. This time, holding white, Cho squeezed by with a win of just half a point. Cho continued his run, his next opponent being Naoto Hikosaka. Again holding white, Cho went on to win by 2 and a half points. His last match of the main tournament was against Tomoyasu Mimura, of which he held white once more, and cruised past by resignation. His opponent for the challenger final was Shinji Takao, who had beaten at then some of the top players in Japan, Masao Kato and Norimoto Yoda, on his way into the loser's section of the tournament. Cho took white in the game, and won by 1 and a half points. This made Cho the challenger for the 43rd Judan against title holder O Rissei. O had held the title for 4 straight years before being challenged by Cho. The final would prove to be an exciting one, as the first match ended with a half point win for Cho. The next match was a win for O, by 5 and a half points. The third match was a very large win for O, winning by 19 and a half points, which is unusual to see in pro games. This didn't stop Cho, as he would get revenge by forcing O into resignation in the fourth game. The fifth and last game would go Cho's way, with a 5 and a half point win over O. This was Cho's 68th title, and fourth time winning the Judan.

== 2006 ==
=== 44th Judan ===
Cho won the first game of the 44th Judan against the then newly crowned Kisei, Keigo Yamashita. The game was won by resignation. The second game went well for Cho, as he would apply his shinogi skills into Yamashita's moyo. There was a large fight in the bottom left corner early in the game. Cho won the game by resignation. In the third game, Yamashita started to fight back and knocked down Cho by 8 and a half points. Yamashita still faced kadoban (1 game from elimination). In the fourth game of the Judan, Cho kept control of Yamashita. He won by 2 and a half points. Cho defended the Judan title for the first time since 1989. It is also his 69th career title.

Cho finished the year with 25 wins and 17 losses, tied for 24th highest in Japan.

== 2007 ==
Cho starts off the year by winning his first three games. The first coming against Toshiya Imamura in a Tengen preliminary match, the second against Hiroshi Yamashiro in a Gosei preliminary, and the third against Kunio Ishii in a Kisei preliminary. The games were played on January 11, 18 and 25 respectively, and all won by resignation. Cho lost in a Fujitsu Cup preliminary to Satoshi Yuki on February 8. He reached the final of the 54th NHK Cup by beating Norimoto Yoda in the semi-final (). He played Satoshi Yuki on March 18, winning the match and title by 3.5 points. It is the third time Cho won the NHK Cup, and 70th of his career. He is the first modern Nihon Ki-in player to reach 70 career titles.

As of September 1, Cho's record for the year is 24–12.

=== 45th Judan ===
Cho won the first game of his second consecutive Judan defense against Keigo Yamashita by resignation. Cho won the second game by 2.5 points, while Yamashita won the third game by resignation. Cho lost again to Yamashita in the fourth game, before finally clinching the final game by 3.5 points while holding black, and thus keeping the title.

== Match against Zen ==
In November 2016, 8 months after Lee Sedol was defeated by computer program AlphaGo, Cho Chikun played a 3-game challenge match against program Zen. Cho won a close game 1, lost game 2 when his invasion into enemy territory was killed, and won game 3. Zen uses neural network techniques similar to AlphaGo, however ran on more modest hardware during the match.

== 1500 Wins Landmark ==
In April 2017, Cho Chikun became the first Japanese player to record a 1500 official wins. His 1500th victory came from the second round of the 7th Igo Masters Cup where he beat Satoshi Kataoka. His record was 1500 wins, 821 losses, 3 draws, and 4 no-results, for a winning percentage of 64.6%. Cho was 60 years ten months at the time and it took him 49 years to achieve the record.

== Cho's dojo ==
Cho has his own dojo where he teaches Go. It also serves as a Go club for many aspiring amateurs. Many students lived in with Cho, and they were given priorities.

Cho's dojo is known for having a strict schedule.

Time	Activity
9:00 – 12:00	Morning Study
12:00 – 15:00	Lunch
15:00 – 18:00	Study
18:30 – 19:00	Dinner
19:00 – 21:00	Study

The dojo has a league also. Each of the students competes. The stronger a player is, the fewer games they have to play. Two different time limit rules are used in the league games. There is a longer time limit where each player has a minute to move, and hayago where the players are given just 10 seconds to make a move. There is no time limit, so any given player can play 1 or 10 games in one day. The league also has a rating system. The ratings are based on the players' winning percentages. There is a handicap, but one that was very different than the orthodox system of allowing the opponent to place the number of stones to the difference in rank. The stronger player gets 10 seconds less in their time for every number difference in rank. There is also a reverse komi rule. 0 komi, —3 komi, —5 komi, and —8 komi.

Cho has also had some good students. His best students include Kim Shushun, who is a 7p in Japan and winner of the 30th Shinjin-O title. Takehisa Matsumoto, who won in the final of the Shinjin-O against Ko Iso in 2006 is a pupil of Cho. This was the second time, and second consecutive time, that a student of Cho's got into the final of a major young player tournament and won. Atsushi Tsuruyama is a 6 dan in Japan and another one of Cho's students. Tetsuya Mitani was also a student of Cho, but later transferred to Takeo Ando. Even one of the best amateur players in the world, Dragoş Băjenaru was a student. Băjenaru placed 3rd in the latest edition of the European Ing Cup, the European version of the Ing Cup.

== Promotion record ==
Rank	Year	Notes
1 dan	1968	Passed qualifying test at Nihon Ki-in. Became youngest modern professional at 11 years and 10 months. Record for the year: 12–7
2 dan	1968	Record for the year: 12–7
3 dan	1969	Record for the year: 27–9
4 dan	1970	Record for the year: 23–5–1
5 dan	1971	Record for the year: 29–5–1
6 dan	1973	Record for the year: 30–11
7 dan	1975	Record for the year: 39–16–1
8 dan	1978	Record for the year: 36–14
9 dan	1980	Record for the year: 38–18

== Titles and runners-up ==
Ranks first in total number of titles won in Japan.

Domestic
Title	Wins	Runners-up
Kisei	8 (1983–1985, 1994, 1996–1999)	4 (1986, 1995, 2000, 2008)
Meijin	9 (1980–1984, 1996–1999)	3 (1985, 2000, 2002)
Honinbo	12 (1981, 1982, 1989–1998)	2 (1983, 1999)
Judan	6 (1982, 1988, 1989, 2005–2007)	4 (1983, 1990, 1991, 2008)
Tengen	2 (1987, 1988)	1 (1989)
Oza	2 (1994, 2001)	6 (1977, 1987, 1995, 1999, 2000, 2002)
Gosei	2 (1979, 1986)	3 (1980, 1982, 1987)
Agon Cup	1 (2002)	5 (1994, 1998, 2000, 2010,2016)
Ryusei	2 (1991, 1993)	3 (1992, 1998, 2015)
NHK Cup	4 (1983, 1992, 1996, 2007)	4 (1980, 2001, 2004, 2008)
NEC Cup	4 (1984, 1985, 2000, 2001)	5 (1988, 1994, 1995, 1998, 2012)
Daiwa Cup		1 (2012)
Nihon Ki-in Championship		1 (1975)
Kakusei	2 (1982, 1985)	2 (1994, 1995)
Shin-Ei	3 (1973, 1974, 1977)	1 (1972)
Hayago Championship	7 (1985, 1990–1992, 1996, 2001, 2002)	1 (1986)
Asahi Pro Best Ten	1 (1975)	
Asahi Top Eight Players	1 (1976)	
Prime Minister Cup		1 (1972)
JAL Super Hayago Championship	1 (2004)	
Igo Masters Cup	4 (2011, 2014, 2015, 2019)	1 (2012)
Total	71	47
Continental
China-Japan Tengen	2 (1988, 1989)	
China-Japan Agon Cup	1 (2003)	
Total	3	0
International
Samsung Cup	1 (2003)	
Fujitsu Cup	1 (1991)	
Tong Yang Cup		1 (1993)
Total	2	1
Career total
Total	76	49

== Awards ==
- Reached career win 1000 in 1999, win 1200 in 2005, and win 1300 in 2008.
- Nine time winner of KIDO magazine's "Most Outstanding Player".
- Nine time winner of the Shusai Prize.
- Journalist Club Prize winner in 1986.
- Honorable citizen of Chiba City award winner in 1996.
- Medal with Purple Ribbon
