= 5th LG Cup =

The 5th LG Cup featured :

- 11 players from South Korea - Cho Hunhyun, Kim Seong-ryong, Lee Chang-ho, Lee Sang-Hoon, Lee Sedol, Rui Naiwei, Seo Bongsoo, Woon Soo-ho, Yang Koon, Yoo Changhyuk, Yoon Sunghyun
- 5 players from China - Chang Hao, Ma Xiaochun, Shao Weigang, Yu Bin, Zhou Heyang
- 5 players from Japan - Cho Chikun, Hikosaka Naoto, Kobayashi Satoru, O Rissei, Yoda Norimoto
- 1 player from Taiwan - Zhou Junxun
- (United States) 1 player from North America - Michael Redmond
- 1 player from Europe - Cătălin Țăranu

== Knockout stages ==
Round of 16
(Japan) O Rissei	1
(South Korea) Yang Koon	0
(South Korea) Cho Hunhyun	1
(Japan) Cho Chikun	0
(Japan) Hikosaka Naoto	0
(South Korea) Lee Chang-ho	1
(China) Ma Xiaochun	1
(South Korea) Woon Soo-ho	0
(South Korea) Seo Bongsoo	1
(China) Yu Bin	0
(China) Zhou Heyang	1
(South Korea) Yoo Changhyuk	0
(South Korea) Rui Naiwei	1
(China) Shao Weigang	0
(South Korea) Lee Sedol	1
(China) Chang Hao	0

Quarter-finals
O Rissei	1
Cho Hunhyun	0
Lee Chang-ho	1
Ma Xiaochun	0
Seo Bongsoo	0
Zhou Heyang	1
Rui Naiwei	0
Lee Sedol	1

Semi-finals
Lee Chang-ho	1
O Rissei	0
Zhou Heyang	0
Lee Sedol	1

Final
Lee Chang-ho	3
Lee Sedol	2

== Final ==
Players	Game 1	Game 2	Game 3	Game 4	Game 5
(South Korea) Lee Chang-ho	Loss	Loss	Won	Won	Won
(South Korea) Lee Sedol	Won	Won	Loss	Loss	Loss
