= 1st Igo Masters Cup =

The 1st Igo Masters Cup began on 24 February and ended on 23 July 2011. Eleven players participated: Kobayashi Koichi (Honorary Kisei, Meijin, and Gosei), Kudo Norio (Tengen 1997, Oza 1977), Rin Kaiho (Honorary Tengen), Kataoka Satoshi (Tengen 1982, 1983), Hane Yasumasa (Oza 1990), Ishida Yoshio (24th Honinbo), Takemiya Masaki (Meijin, Honinbo, and Judan), Cho Chikun (25th Honinbo, Honorary Meijin), O Rissei (Kisei, Judan, and Oza), Kobayashi Satoru (Kisei, Gosei 1995), Otake Hideo (Honorary Gosei).

Kobayashi Koichi, Ishida Yoshio, Takemiya Masaki, Cho Chikun, and Otake Hideo were given first round byes.

== Tournament ==
Quarter-finals
24 March
Kobayashi Koichi	1
Rin Kaiho	0
24 March
Kataoka Satoshi	0
Ishida Yoshio	1
31 March
Takemiya Masaki	0
Cho Chikun	1
21 April
Kobayashi Satoru	1
Otake Hideo	0

Semi-finals
25 June
Kobayashi Koichi	1
Ishida Yoshio	0
25 June
Cho Chikun	1
Kobayashi Satoru	0

Final
Kobayashi Koichi	0
Cho Chikun	1
