= Akira Ishida (Go player) =

Japanese Go player (born 1949)

Personal information
- Native name: 石田章 (Japanese)
- Born: May 23, 1949 (age 77) Tokyo, Japan

Sport
- Turned pro: 1966
- Teacher: Fukuda Masayoshi
- Rank: 9 dan
- Affiliation: Nihon Ki-in

Akira Ishida (石田章, Ishida Akira) (born May 23, 1949) is a professional Go player. He is also the co-author of the go strategy book Attack and Defense.

== Biography ==
Ishida was a student of Fukuda Masayoshi when he became an insei. 8 years after becoming an insei, Ishida became a pro in 1966. He was promoted quickly, reaching 9 dan in 1982. In 1972, he won the Oteai's top section, and later went on to win two straight Shinjin-O titles in 1978 and 1979. Two years later, he won another title, the Shin-Ei. He won the "Best Technique Award" from Kido on three occasions. He currently resides in Tokyo, Japan.

== Promotion record ==
Rank	Year	Notes
1 dan	1966	
2 dan	1967	
3 dan	1968	
4 dan	1970	
5 dan	1971	
6 dan	1973	
7 dan	1975	
8 dan	1979	
9 dan	1982	

== Titles ==
Title	Years Held
Current	1
(Japan) Shinjin-O	1978, 1979
Defunct	1
(Japan) Shin-Ei	1981
