= Kim Dong-hee =

Kim Dong-hee may refer to:

- Kim Dong-hee (Go player) (born 1985), professional Go player
- Kim Dong-hee (footballer) (born 1989), South Korean footballer
- Kim Dong-hee (actor) (born 1999), South Korean actor
