= 16th GS Caltex Cup =

The 16th GS Caltex Cup began in January 2011. Won Seong-jin, the defending champion, was knocked out in the first round.

== Tournament ==
As of 1 July 2011.

Round of 16
4 April
Park Seunghyun	0
Park Junghwan	1
9 May
Park Seunghwa	0
Kim Jiseok	1
4 May
Ryu Jaehyeong	1
Heo Yeongho	0
23 May
An Hyungjun	0
Lee Younggu	1
16 May
Kim Sedong	0
Cho Hanseung	1
21 March
Yeom Junghoon	0
Kang Dongyun	1
18 April
Kim Juho	0
Pak Yeong-hun	1
11 April
Kang Changbae	1
Won Seong-jin	0

Quarter-finals
28 June
Park Junghwan	1
Kim Jiseok	0
30 May
Ryu Jaehyeong	0
Lee Younggu	1
6 June
Cho Hanseung	1
Kang Dongyun	0
20 June
Pak Yeong-hun	1
Kang Changbae	0

Semi-finals
Park Junghwan	1
Lee Younggu	0
Cho Hanseung	0
Pak Yeong-hun	1

Final
Park Junghwan	3
Pak Yeong-hun	0
