= Ryusei (competition) =

The Ryusei (竜星戦, Ryūsei-sen) is a Go competition.

== Biography ==
The Ryusei is a Go competition used by the Japanese Nihon-Kiin. It was started in 1991 and is a fast go tournament. The tournament consists of four sections. The winner from each section, along with the player who won the most games in each section play in a single knockout tournament. The winner is decided this way. The winner's purse is 5,000,000 Yen ($43,000).

== Past winners ==
Ryusei
No.	Year	Winner	Runner-up
1	1991	Cho Chikun	Ishida Yoshio
2	1992	Otake Hideo	Cho Chikun
3	1993	Cho Chikun	Ryu Shikun
4	1994	Morita Michihiro	Rin Kaiho
5	1996	Kobayashi Satoru	Nakaonoda Tomomi
6	1997	Kobayashi Koichi	Komatsu Hideki
7	1998	Kato Masao	Cho Chikun
8	1999	Yamada Kimio	Morita Michihiro
9	2000	Takao Shinji	Takagi Shoichi
10	2001	Kato Masao	Cho U
11	2002	Kobayashi Koichi	O Meien
12	2003	Kobayashi Koichi	Hane Naoki
13	2004	Takao Shinji	Yamada Kimio
14	2005	Yuki Satoshi	Cho U
15	2006	Cho U	Yuki Satoshi
16	2007	Cho U	Yuki Satoshi
17	2008	Kono Rin	Cho U
18	2009	Iyama Yuta	Cho U
19	2010	Yamashita Keigo	Nakano Hironari
20	2011	Iyama Yuta	Yuki Satoshi
21	2012	Iyama Yuta	Rin Kanketsu
22	2013	Yamashita Keigo	Kono Rin
23	2014	Kono Rin	Yu Zhengqi
24	2015	Yuki Satoshi	Cho Chikun
25	2016	Ichiriki Ryo	Iyama Yuta
26	2017	Shibano Toramaru	Yu Zhengqi
27	2018	Ichiriki Ryo	Motoki Katsuya
28	2019	Ichiriki Ryo	Ueno Asami
29	2020	Ichiriki Ryo	Iyama Yuta
30	2021	Shibano Toramaru	Hsu Chia-yuan
31	2022	Iyama Yuta	Yuki Satoshi
32	2023	Iyama Yuta	Shibano Toramaru
33	2024	Fukuoka Kotaro	Iyama Yuta
34	2025	Shibano Toramaru	Iyama Yuta
