= Asahi Top Eight Players =

- Full name: Asahi Top Eight Players
- Started: 1976
- Defunct: 1976
- Sponsors: Asahi Shimbun
- Affiliation: Nihon Ki-in

The Asahi Top Eight Players was a Go competition.

== Outline ==
The final was a best-of-three match. This tournament was short-lived, being played only one year.

== Past winners ==
Player	Years Held
Cho Chikun	1976
