= Xinren Wang =

Chinese Go competition

The Xinren Wang (Chinese: 新人王赛; pinyin: Xīnrén Wáng), literally meaning King of the New Stars, is a Go competition in China. It is equivalent to the Shinjin-O in Japan.

== Outline ==
The Xinren Wang is a Go tournament held by the Zhongguo Qiyuan for players under 20 years of age and under 7 dan. In 2007, the age limit was lowered from 30 to 20. The format is a single knockout, and the final is a best-of-3.

The winner's prize is 120,000 RMB the runner-up's prize is 70,000 RMB (as of 2025).

== Past winners and runners-up ==
Edition	Year	Winner	Score	Runner-up
1st	1994	Liang Weitang	2–0	Wang Lei
2nd	1995	Shao Weigang	2–0	Wang Lei
3rd	1996	Chang Hao	2–1	Wang Yuhui
4th	1997	Liu Jun	2–0	Wang Hui
5th	1998	Zou Junjie	2–0	Luo Xihe
6th	1999	Hu Yaoyu	2–1	Qiu Jun
7th	2000	Liu Shizhen	2–0	Ding Wei
8th	2001	Gu Li	2–0	Huang Yizhong
9th	2002	Peng Quan	2–1	Qiu Jun
10th	2003	Kong Jie	2–0	Hu Yaoyu
11th	2004	Qiu Jun	2–1	Wang Xi
12th	2005	Gu Li	2–0	Yin Hang
13th	2006	Li Zhe	2–1	Wang Yao
14th	2007	Zhou Ruiyang	2–0	Wang Lei
15th	2008	Zhou Ruiyang	2–0	Tuo Jiaxi
16th	2009	Shi Yue	2–0	Zhu Yuanhao
17th	2010	Fan Tingyu	2–0	Yan Huan
18th	2011	Fan Tingyu	2–0	Mao Ruilong
19th	2012	Fan Tingyu	2–0	Huang Yunsong
20th	2013	Tao Xinran	2–1	Fan Yunruo
21st	2014	Yu Zhiying	2–1	Li Qincheng
22nd	2015	Liao Yuanhe	2–1	Huang Jingyuan
23rd	2019	Zhou Hongyu	2–0	Chen Haoxin
24th	2020	Tu Xiaoyu	2–1	Wang Xinghao
25th	2021	Tu Xiaoyu	2–1	Wang Xinghao
26th	2022	Wang Xinghao	2–0	Zhou Hongyu
27th	2023	Xu Yidi	2–0	Wang Chunhui
28th	2024	Chen Chuxuan	2–1	Zhou Ziyi
29th	2025	Ye Changxin	2–1	Zhang Xinyu
30th	2026	Lin Zijie	2–0	Huang Qiuxuan

== See also ==
- Shinjin-O
