= Nakamura Shinya =

Japanese Go player

Personal information
- Native name: 仲邑信也 (Japanese)
- Full name: Nakamura Shinya
- Born: April 10, 1973 (age 53) Osaka, Japan

Sport
- Turned pro: 1991
- Teacher: Yorimoto Yamashita
- Rank: 9 dan
- Affiliation: Nihon Ki-in, Kansai branch

Nakamura Shinya (仲邑 信也, Nakamura Shin'ya; born April 10, 1973) is a professional Go player.

== Biography ==
Nakamura became a professional in 1991. He reached 8 dan in 2001, and is currently 9 dan. Nakamura was taught by Yorimoto Yamashita. In 1996, Nakamura lost in the Shinjin-O final to future Honinbō Shinji Takao. Two years later, in 1998, he won his first and only title, the 13th NEC Shun-Ei.

His daughter Sumire Nakamura is also a professional Go player.

== Titles and runners-up ==
Title	Years Held
Defunct	1
(Japan) NEC Shun-Ei	1998

Title	Years Lost
Current	1
(Japan) Shinjin-O	1996
