= Kim Shushun =

South Korean Go player (born 1979)

Personal information
- Native name: 金秀俊 (Japanese); キムスジュン (Japanese); 김수준 (Korean); 金秀俊 (Korean); Gim Sujun (Revised Romanization); Kim Sujun (McCune–Reischauer)
- Full name: Kim Shushun
- Born: January 24, 1979 (age 47) South Korea

Sport
- Turned pro: 1996
- Teacher: Kweon Kap-yong, Cho Chikun
- Rank: 9 dan
- Affiliation: Nihon Ki-in Tokyo branch

Kim Shushun (金秀俊, きむ すじゅん, 김수준, born January 24, 1979), also known as Kin Hidetoshi, Kim Shujun, or Kim Sujun, is a professional Go player.

== Biography ==
Kim became a professional in 1996. In 2007, he was promoted to 8 dan. His teacher is Cho Chikun. He made it to the final of the 16th NEC Shun-Ei, only to be beaten by Mizokami Tomochika. Coincidentally, he played the game on the same day as his teacher, Cho Chikun, played in the final of the NEC Cup. He won his 400th career game in 2006.

== Titles & runners-up ==
Title	Years Held
Current	1
(Japan) Shinjin-O	2005

Title	Years Lost
Defunct	4
(Japan) Shin-Ei	2001, 2002
(Japan) NEC Shun-Ei	2001

== Promotion record ==
Rank	Year	Notes
1 dan	1996	
2 dan	1996	
3 dan	1997	
4 dan	1998	
5 dan	1999	
6 dan	2000	
7 dan	2002	
8 dan	2007	
9 dan	2018	

== See also ==
- Go players
