= Takeo Ando =

Japanese Go player

Personal information
- Native name: 安藤武夫 (Japanese)
- Full name: Takeo Ando
- Born: September 11, 1938 (age 87) Tokyo, Japan

Sport
- Retired: 2000
- Teacher: Tomoe Ito
- Pupil: Norimoto Yoda, Cho Sonjin, Tomomi Nakaonoda, Kanda Ei, Arimura Hiroshi, Tominaga Takeshi, Takuji Yamada
- Rank: 9 dan

Takeo Ando (安藤 武夫, Andō Takeo; born September 11, 1938 in Tokyo, Japan), also known as Takeo Suzuki, is a professional Go player.

== Biography ==
Takeo served as the chief director of the Japanese go organization, the Nihon Ki-in, for many years up until his retirement in 2000. He is known for being the teacher of many strong players including Norimoto Yoda. Cho Sonjin, Tomomi Nakaonoda, and Kanda Ei. Takeo's other pupils include Arimura Hiroshi, Tominaga Takeshi, and Yamada Takuji.
