= Takehisa Matsumoto =

Japanese Go player

Personal information
- Native name: 松本武久 (Japanese)
- Full name: Takehisa Matsumoto
- Born: September 8, 1980 (age 45) Gotō, Nagasaki, Japan

Sport
- Turned pro: 1997
- Teacher: Cho Chikun
- Rank: 8 dan
- Affiliation: Nihon Ki-in

Takehisa Matsumoto (松本武久, Matsumoto Takehisa; born September 8, 1980 in Gotō, Nagasaki, Japan) is a professional go player.

== Biography ==
Takehisa is a student of top title holder Cho Chikun. In 1997 he became a professional at the Nihon Ki-in institute in Japan. He quickly moved up the ranks, being promoted to 3 dan just the next year. In 2003 he reached a total number of 200 wins as a professional go player. In 2006 he won his first title, the Shinjin-O. His opponent in the final was Ko Iso. Takehisa took the first game, but Ko would come back and take the second. The title came down to the last game, and Takehisa won by 5.5 points.

== Titles ==
Title	Years Held
Current	1
(Japan) Shinjin-O	2006
Total	1
