= Michihiro Morita =

Japanese Go player

Personal information
- Native name: 森田道博 (Japanese)
- Full name: Michihiro Morita
- Born: October 18, 1970 (age 55) Chiba, Japan

Sport
- Turned pro: 1984
- Teacher: Hideyuki Fujisawa
- Rank: 9 dan
- Affiliation: Nihon Ki-in

Michihiro Morita (森田道博, Morita Michihiro; born October 18, 1970) is a professional Go player.

== Biography ==
Morita became a professional in 1984. He was promoted to 9 dan in 1998.

== Titles & runners-up ==
Title	Years Held
Current	1
(Japan) Ryusei	1994
Defunct	1
(Japan) NEC Shun-Ei	1996

Title	Years Lost
Current	1
(Japan) Ryusei	1999
Current	2
(Japan) NEC Shun-Ei	1992, 1995
