= Miyazawa Goro =

Japanese Go player (born 1949)

Personal information
- Native name: 宮沢吾朗 (Japanese)
- Full name: Miyazawa Goro
- Born: November 29, 1949 (age 76) Obihiro, Japan

Sport
- Turned pro: 1966
- Teacher: Minoru Kitani
- Rank: 9 dan
- Affiliation: Nihon Ki-in

Miyazawa Goro (宮沢吾朗, Miyazawa Goro; born November 29, 1949) is a professional Go player.

Miyazawa turned professional in 1966 and reached 9 dan in 1993. He currently resides in the Kanagawa Prefecture in Japan.

He is the father of Sakana-kun, an illustrator, ichthyologist and television personality.

== Titles & runners-up ==
Title	Years Held
Current	2
(Japan) Shinjin-O	1980, 1985

Title	Years Lost
Current	1
(Japan) Shinjin-O	1983
