= Atsushi Tsuruyama =

Japanese Go player

Personal information
- Native name: 鶴山淳志 (Japanese); ツルヤマアツシ (Japanese)
- Full name: Atsushi Tsuruyama
- Born: August 31, 1981 (age 44) Kumamoto, Japan

Sport
- Turned pro: 1999
- Teacher: Cho Chikun
- Rank: 8 dan
- Affiliation: Nihon Ki-in

Atsushi Tsuruyama (鶴山淳志, Tsuruyama Atsushi) (born August 31, 1981) is a professional Go player.

== Biography ==
Atsushi turned professional in 1999 and was promoted to 2 dan in the same year. In 2004, Atsushi was awarded a prize for having the highest winning percentage among Japanese professionals. His record was 27 wins and 9 losses, totaling to a 75% win ratio. In the same year he reached his 200th career win. Atsushi participated in the 10th Samsung Cup in 2005 as a Japan representative.
