= Takuji Yamada =

Japanese Go player

Personal information
- Native name: 山田拓自 (Japanese); ヤマダタクジ (Japanese)
- Full name: Takuji Yamada
- Born: August 6, 1979 (age 46) Gifu, Japan

Sport
- Turned pro: 1995
- Teacher: Takeo Ando
- Rank: 7 dan
- Affiliation: Nihon Ki-in, Tokyo branch

Takuji Yamada (山田拓自, Yamada Takuji; born August 6, 1979) is a professional Go player.

Takuji became a professional in 1995, was promoted to 7 dan in 2002 and reached 200 career wins in 2003.

== Promotion record ==
Rank	Year	Notes
1 dan	1995	
2 dan	1995	
3 dan	1996	
4 dan	1997	
5 dan	1998	
6 dan	2000	
7 dan	2002	
8 dan	–	
9 dan	–	
