= Shuhei Uchida =

Japanese professional Go player (born 1989)

Personal information
- Full name: Shuhei Uchida
- Born: 8 September 1989 (age 36) Yamanashi Prefecture, Japan

Sport
- Turned pro: 2005
- Teacher: Morito Obuchi
- Rank: 8 dan
- Affiliation: Nihon Ki-in, Tokyo branch

Shuhei Uchida (内田 修平, Uchida Shūhei; born 8 September 1989) is a Japanese professional Go player. A former grade school national champion, Uchida became a professional in 2005. He won his first title, the Shinjin-O, in 2008.

== Early life ==
Uchida is a pupil of Morito Obuchi. He was the national champion among sixth grade boys and girls. After winning his first title in 2008, Uchida won two Hiroshima-Aluminum Cup titles in 2009 and 2011. He was promoted to 7 dan in 2011 after qualifying for the 37th Meijin.

== Promotion record ==
| Rank | Year | Notes |
|---|---|---|
| 1 dan | 2005 | |
| 2 dan | 2007 | |
| 3 dan | 2009 | |
| 4 dan | 2010 | |
| 5 dan | 2011 | |
| 6 dan | | |
| 7 dan | 2011 | Promoted from 5 to 7 dan for qualifying for the 37th Meijin |
| 8 dan | 2021 | Won 150 games at 7 dan |
| 9 dan | | |

== Titles and runners-up ==
Domestic
| Title | Wins | Runners-up |
|---|---|---|
| Shinjin-O | 1 (2008) | |
| Hiroshima-Aluminum Cup | 2 (2009, 2011) | |
| Total | 3 | 0 |
