= Kim Dong-hee (Go player) =

South Korean Go player

Personal information
- Native name: 김동희 (Korean); 金東熙 (Korean); Gim Donghui (Revised Romanization); Kim Tonghŭi (McCune–Reischauer)
- Born: October 24, 1985 (age 40) South Korea

Sport
- Turned pro: 2003
- Rank: 4 dan
- Affiliation: Hanguk Kiwon

Kim Dong-hee (born October 24, 1985) is a South Korean professional Go player.

== Biography ==
In 2005, he was runner-up for the BC Card Cup.

== Runners-up ==
Title	Years Lost
Current	1
(South Korea) BC Card Cup	2005

== Promotion record ==
Rank	Year	Notes
1 dan	2003	
2 dan	2005	
3 dan	2011	
4 dan	2017	
5 dan		
6 dan		
7 dan		
8 dan		
9 dan		
