= Shuzo Awaji =

Japanese Go player

Personal information
- Native name: 淡路修三 (Japanese)
- Full name: Shuzo Awaji
- Born: August 13, 1949 (age 76) Tokyo, Japan

Sport
- Teacher: Tomoe Ito
- Rank: 9 dan
- Affiliation: Nihon Ki-in

Shuzo Awaji (淡路修三, Awaji Shuzo; born August 13, 1949) is a professional Go player.

== Biography ==
Shuzo Awaji became a professional Go player when he was 19 years old. He was promoted to 9 dan after he challenged for the 1984 Honinbo title. Despite challenging for all of the big seven titles in Japan (Kisei, Meijin, Honinbo, Judan, Tengen, Oza and Gosei), he has never won any of them.

== Titles & runners-up ==
Titles	Years Held
Defunct	1
(Japan) Shin-Ei	1978, 1980

Titles	Years Lost
Current	4
(Japan) Meijin	1989
(Japan) Honinbo	1984
(Japan) Tengen	1983
(Japan) Gosei	1983
