= Park Seung-hyun =

South Korean Go player

Park Seunghyun
Personal information
- Native name: 박승현 (Korean); 朴昇賢 (Korean); Pak Sŭnghyŏn (McCune–Reischauer)
- Full name: Park Seunghyun
- Born: May 28, 1984 (age 42), South Korea

Sport
- Turned pro: 2000
- Teacher: Kwan Kab Ryong
- Rank: 8 dan
- Affiliation: Hanguk Kiwon

Park Seunghyun (born May 28, 1984) is a professional Go player.

== Biography ==
Park was taught by Kwan Kab Ryong. He became a professional in 2000. In 2001, he was promoted to 2 dan, then 4 dan in 2004. He is currently 8 dan. He has participated in the 2002 Samsung Cup and 2007 LG Cup.
