= Yamada Kimio =

Japanese Go player (born 1972)

Personal information
- Native name: 山田規三生 (Japanese)
- Full name: Yamada Kimio
- Born: 9 September 1972 (age 53) Osaka, Japan

Sport
- Turned pro: 1989
- Teacher: Yorimoto Yamashita
- Rank: 9 dan
- Affiliation: Nihon Ki-in, Kansai branch

Yamada Kimio
Medal record

Representing Japan

Asian Games
Bronze medal – third place	2010 Guangzhou	Men's Team

Yamada Kimio (山田 規三生, Yamada Kimio; born 9 September 1972) is a professional Go player. A territorial player who is adept at invading and living within opponent's spheres of influence, Yamada won his first major title, the Oza, in 1997. He has two older brothers, Shiho Yamada and Wakio Yamada.

== Biography ==
Yamada began playing Go at the beginning of his school career. Two years later, he became a pupil of Yorimoto Yamashita, who adjudged Yamada to be a 6 dan amateur at the time. He was often praised for his extensive studying and deep reading. Yamada became a professional in 1989. In his first year as a professional, Yamada scored a record of 23 wins and six losses.

Yamada won the "New Player Award" in 1992 and won his first title, the Shin-Ei, in 1993. He was also winner of the top Oteai section that same year. Yamada won another young players tournament, the Shinjin-O, in 1997. He continued at a winning rate of 80% – including an 18-game winning streak, for which he won an award – up until his first major title challenge: the Oza in 1997. It was at that time the nickname, "King of Cool", was bestowed upon him by Go journalist John Fairbarn.

He defeated title-holder Ryu Shikun three to one to claim his first major title, but then lost the title the following year to O Rissei. In 1999, Yamada reached the semi-finals of the challenger tournament for the Oza. He was invited to participate in the 1st Chunlan Cup in 1998. In 1999, Yamada reached the semi-finals of the Samsung Cup, losing to Lee Chang-ho by resignation. The following year Yamada reached the finals, but lost again to another Korean player, Yoo Changhyuk, three to one.

Yamada won the 7 dan division of the 23rd Kisei tournament when he defeated Naoki Hane on 22 April 1999. In the first round of the main tournament, Yamada defeated Hiroyuki Hiroe. In the second round, Yamada faced the previous Kisei runner-up, Norimoto Yoda, and lost. While challenging for the Kisei title, Yamada reached the final of the 8th Ryusei in 1999, defeating Michihiro Morita. At the end of 1999, Yamada finished 8th in the top prize winners with ¥23,627,000. Yamada was a part of the Japanese team at the 1st Nongshim Cup in 2000. He was eliminated in his only game against Chang Hao. In May 2000, Yamada was promoted to 8 dan.

Yamada finished 15th in most prize money for 2001 with ¥12,919,960. In 2003, Yamada won the award for most consecutive victories with 18. He won his 600th career game in 2004, the third fastest ever at 15 years and 6 months. Three years later, Yamada won his 700th game, becoming the second fastest to reach 700 wins. In 2004, Yamada reached the finals of the Gosei tournament, his first major title challenge in six years. Yamada was the first player to be promoted from 8 dan to 9 dan for cumulative victories in 2006. He challenged for the Honinbo title that same year, losing to Shinji Takao in six games. Yamada challenged for the Oza title twice more in 2009 and 2010, losing both times to title holder Cho U. He won the NHK Cup in 2010.

== Promotion record ==
Rank	Year	Notes
1 dan	1989	
2 dan	1989	
3 dan	1990	
4 dan	1991	
5 dan	1992	
6 dan	1993	Winner of the Oteai.
7 dan	1995	
8 dan	2000	
9 dan	2006	Promoted for winning 200 games as an 8 dan.

== Career record ==
- 1989: 23–6
- 1990: 23–6
- 1991: 39–5
- 1992: 35–10
- 1993: 39–9
- 1994: 40–10
- 1995: 40–14
- 1996: 40–12
- 1997: 47–11 (most wins in Japan)
- 1998: 47–19
- 1999: 21–18
- 2000: 39–20
- 2001: 38–15
- 2002: 32–13 (through 4 October 2002)
- 2004: 33–21
- 2006: 35–23
- 2007: 33–18
- 2008: 31–18
- 2009: 29–20
- 2010: 25–25
- 2011: 17–3 (as of 26 June 2011)

== Titles and runners-up ==
Domestic
Title	Wins	Runners-up
Honinbo		1 (2006)
Oza	1 (1997)	3 (1998, 2009, 2010)
Gosei		1 (2004)
Ryusei	1 (1999)	1 (2004)
NHK Cup	1 (2010)	
Shinjin-O	1 (1997)	
Hayago Championship		1 (1994)
NEC Shun-Ei		1 (1996)
Shin-Ei	2 (1993, 1998)	
Total	6	8
International
Samsung Cup		1 (2000)
Total	0	1
Career total
Total	6	9
