= Ko Iso =

Taiwanese Go player (born 1987)

Personal information
- Native name: コウイソ (Japanese); 黃翊祖 (Chinese); Huáng Yìzǔ (Pinyin)
- Full name: Ko Iso
- Born: April 10, 1987 (age 39) Taiwan

Sport
- Turned pro: 2002
- Rank: 9 dan
- Affiliation: Nihon Ki-in

Ko Iso (simplified Chinese: 黄翊祖; traditional Chinese: 黃翊祖; pinyin: Huáng Yìzǔ; born April 10, 1987) is a professional Go player.

== Biography ==
Ko became a professional in 2002. He was promoted to 7 dan after making it through the preliminary rounds of the Meijin tournament.

== Promotion record ==
Rank	Year	Notes
1 dan	2002	
2 dan	2002	
3 dan	2003	
4 dan	2005	
5 dan	2005	Skipped due to qualifying for Meijin leagues. (Special Nihon Ki-in rule)
6 dan	2005	Skipped due to qualifying for Meijin leagues. (Special Nihon Ki-in rule)
7 dan	2005	
8 dan	2011	
9 dan	2019	Won 200 games at 8 dan

== Runners-up ==
Title	Years Lost
(Japan) Shinjin-O	2006
