= Han Zenki =

Taiwanese Go player

Personal information
- Native name: 潘善琪 (Japanese); 潘善琪 (Chinese); Pān Shànqí (Pinyin)
- Full name: Han Zenki
- Born: October 7, 1977 (age 48) Taiwan

Sport
- Turned pro: 1996
- Teacher: Oeda Yusuke
- Rank: 8 dan
- Affiliation: Nihon Ki-in; Tokyo branch

Han Zenki (潘善琪; born October 7, 1977), also known as Pan Shanqi (Chinese: 潘善琪; pinyin: Pān Shànqí) is a professional Go player.

== Biography ==
Han was born in Taiwan in 1977. He became a professional Go player in 1996. In the same year, he was promoted to 2-dan. In 2000, he was promoted to 5-dan. He is currently at the 8-dan rank.
