= Sakai Hideyuki =

Japanese Go player (born 1973)

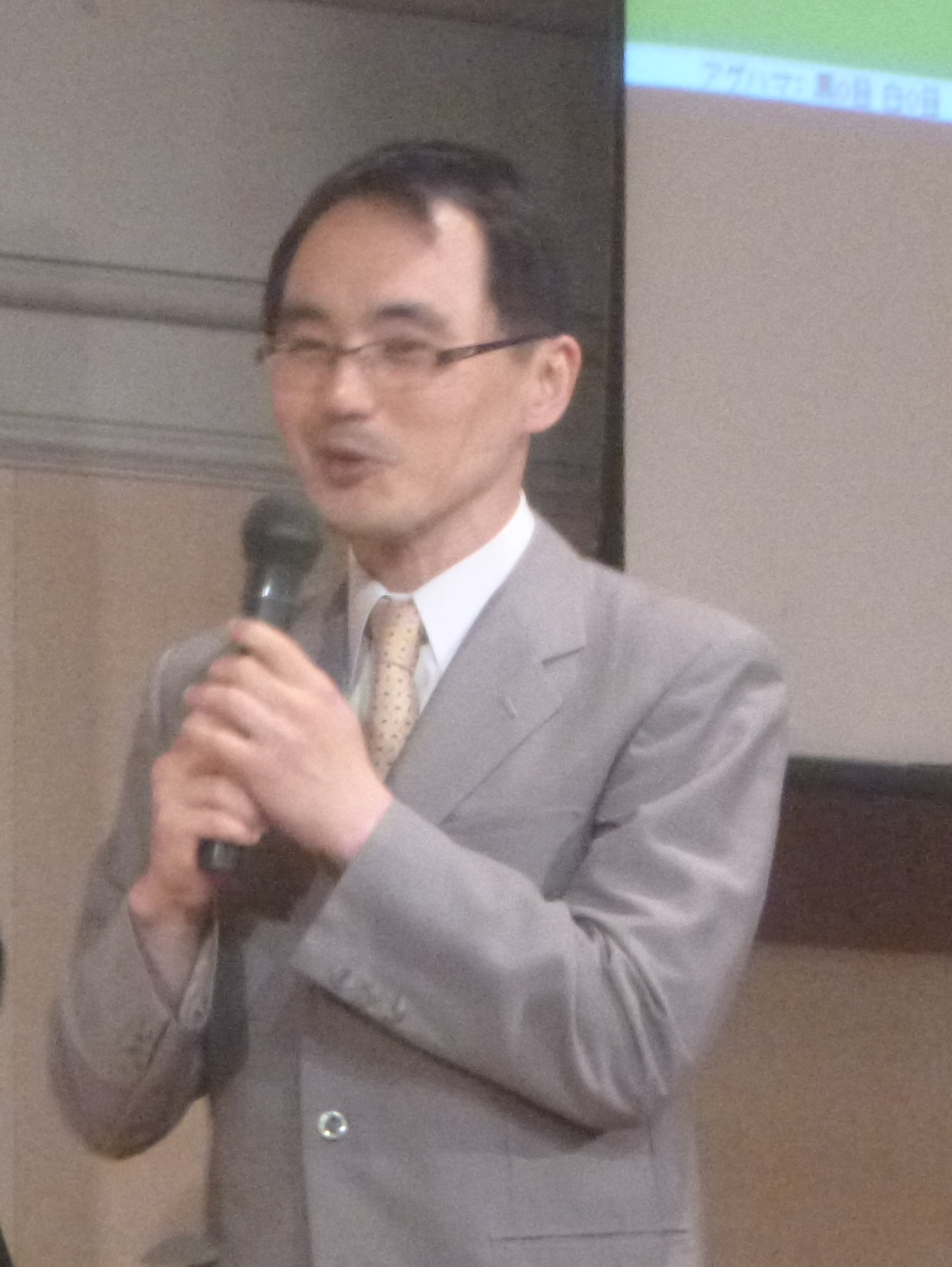

Personal information
- Native name: 坂井秀至 (Japanese)
- Full name: Sakai Hideyuki
- Born: April 23, 1973 (age 53) Sanda, Hyōgo, Japan

Sport
- Turned pro: 2000
- Teacher: Sunao Sato
- Rank: 8 dan
- Affiliation: Kansai Ki-in

Sakai Hideyuki (坂井秀至, Sakai Hideyuki; born April 23, 1973) is a professional Go player.

== Biography ==
Before becoming a professional, Sakai was majoring in medical science at Kyoto University. For a long time, Sakai was the strongest amateur player in Japan, and when he won the World Amateur Go Championship in 2000, the Kansai Ki-in awarded him professional 5 dan (after defeating two 5 dan and two 7 dan players). He was also the first player in Japan to be awarded a special 8 dan (amateur) diploma. In 2003, he won the biggest Kansai Ki-in tournament, the Kansai Ki-in Championship. In 2004, he was runner-up for the Shinjin-O title, losing to Mizokami Tomochika two games to one (losing both by half point). He is currently active in various tournament leagues for both the Nihon Ki-in (participation in Meijin league 2005–present) and the Kansai Ki-in.

In 2010, Sakai won the Gosei title, defeating title-holder Cho U 3–2.

== Titles and runners-up ==
Domestic
Title	Wins	Runners-up
Gosei	1 (2010)	1 (2011)
Shinjin-O		1 (2004)
Kansai Ki-in Championship	4 (2003, 2011–2013)	3 (2004, 2007, 2014)
Total	5	5
