= Shin-Ei =

The Shin-Ei was a Go competition.

== Outline ==
The Shin-Ei was a Go competition held where players under the age of 30 and 7 dan would compete in.

== Past winners ==
Player	Years Held
Ishida Yoshio	1969
Takagi Shoichi	1970
Kojima Takaho	1971
Kobayashi Koichi	1972, 1975
Cho Chikun	1973, 1974, 1976
Awaji Shuzo	1978, 1980
Kamimura Haruo	1979
Ishida Akira	1981
Kobayashi Satoru	1982
O Rissei	1983
Imamura Toshiya	1984
Sonoda Yasutaka	1985
Yoda Norimoto	1986, 1987
Komatsu Hideki	1988, 1990
Hiroe Hiroyuki	1989
Cho Sonjin	1991
Yamada Kimio	1993, 1998
Enda Hideki	1995
Hane Naoki	1996
Yo Kagen	1997
Mimura Tomoyasu	1999
Yamashita Keigo	2000
Takanashi Seiken	2001
Mizokami Tomochika	2002
