= Oteai =

Japanese Go tournament

The Oteai (大手合, Ōteai) was a tournament used in Japan, by the Nihon Ki-in and Kansai Ki-in, to determine the ranking of its go professionals on the dan scale. It was instituted in the 1920s soon after the Ki-in was set up in 1924. Initially it was run in Spring and Autumn sessions in Tokyo, with the pros brought together to play around eight games in each session (the name means simply "grand meeting"). It has currently ceased to exist after it was replaced by new reforms. Professionals in the Nihon Ki-in could claim promotions based on their performance in the Oteai. To qualify for a promotion, players had to win a certain percentage of a certain number of successive games. The proportion, and number of games depended on the player's current rank, with qualification obviously becoming more stringent as one progressed.
