= Shigeaki Yokota =

Japanese Go player

Personal information
- Native name: 横田茂昭 (Japanese)
- Full name: Shigeaki Yokota
- Born: May 1, 1969 (age 57) Okayama, Japan

Sport
- Turned pro: 1983
- Teacher: Akagi Kazuo
- Rank: 9 dan
- Affiliation: Kansai Ki-in

Shigeaki Yokota (横田茂昭, Yokota Shigeaki) (born May 1, 1969 in Okayama, Japan) is a professional Go player.

== Biography ==
Shigeaki became a professional in 1983. He was promoted to 9 dan by the Kansai Ki-in in 1995. He is a pupil of Akagi Kazuo. He currently resides in Okayama, Japan.

== Titles & runners-up ==
Title	Years Held
(Japan) Kansai Ki-in Championship	2005
