= Naoto Hikosaka =

Japanese Go player

Personal information
- Native name: 彦坂直人 (Japanese)
- Full name: Naoto Hikosaka
- Born: March 17, 1962 (age 64) Nagoya, Japan

Sport
- Teacher: Toshio Sakai
- Rank: 9 dan
- Affiliation: Nihon Ki-in; Nagoya branch

Naoto Hikosaka (彦坂直人, Hikosaka Naoto; born March 17, 1962) is a professional Go player.

== Biography ==
Hikosaka turned pro in 1976 at the age of 14

== Titles & runners-up ==
Title	Years Held
Current	1
(Japan) Judan	1998

Title	Years Lost
Current	3
(Japan) Judan	1999
(Japan) Okan	1996, 2003
Defunct	2
(Japan) Kakusei	2000
(Japan) Shin-Ei	1987
