= Hideki Komatsu =

Japanese Go player

Personal information
- Native name: 小松英樹 (Japanese)
- Full name: Hideki Komatsu
- Born: March 4, 1967 (age 59) Aichi, Japan

Sport
- Turned pro: 1981
- Teacher: Yasunaga Hajime
- Rank: 9 dan
- Affiliation: Nihon Ki-in

Hideki Komatsu (小松英樹, Komatsu Hideki; born March 4, 1967) is a professional Go player.

== Biography ==
Komatsu was born in Aichi, Japan and quickly rose among the ranks of Go in the 1980s and early 1990s. He currently resides in Tokyo, Japan.

== Promotion record ==
Rank	Year	Notes
1 dan	1981	
2 dan	1981	
3 dan	1982	
4 dan	1983	
5 dan	1985	
6 dan	1987	
7 dan	1989	
8 dan	1992	
9 dan	1995	

== Titles & runners-up ==
Title	Years Held
Current	3
(Japan) NEC Cup	1993
(Japan) Shinjin-O	1988, 1992
Defunct	4
(Japan) Shin-Ei	1988, 1990
(Japan) NEC Shun-Ei	1990, 1992

Title	Years Lost
Current	1
(Japan) Ryusei	1997
