= So Yokoku =

Japanese Go player

Personal information
- Native name: 蘇耀国 (Japanese); Sū Yàoguó (Pinyin)
- Full name: So Yokoku
- Born: September 11, 1979 (age 46) Guangzhou, China

Sport
- Turned pro: 1994
- Teacher: Oka Nobumitsu
- Rank: 9 dan
- Affiliation: Nihon Ki-in

So Yokoku (蘇耀国, born September 11, 1979) is a professional Go player.

== Biography ==
So became a professional in 1994. He was originally from China, and moved to Japan in 1991.

Rank	Year	Notes
1 dan	1994	Became pro
2 dan	1994	
3 dan	1995	
4 dan	1996	
5 dan	1997	
6 dan	1999	
7 dan	2001	reached 300th career wins in 2003
8 dan	2005	reached 400th career wins in 2006
9 dan	2014	

== Titles ==
Title	Years Held
(Japan) NEC Shun-Ei	1999
(Japan) Shinjin-O	2003
