= Cho U =

Taiwanese Go player (born 1980)

Personal information
- Native name: Trad. 張栩 Simp. 张栩 (Chinese); Zhāng Xǔ (Pinyin)
- Full name: U Chō
- Born: 20 January 1980 (age 46) Taipei, Taiwan

Sport
- Turned pro: 1994
- Teacher: Rin Kaiho
- Rank: 9 dan
- Affiliation: Nihon Ki-in; Tokyo branch

Cho U

Chinese name
- Traditional Chinese: 張栩
- Simplified Chinese: 张栩
Transcriptions
Standard Mandarin
- Hanyu Pinyin: Zhāng Xǔ
- Bopomofo: ㄓㄤ ㄒㄩ
- Wade–Giles: Chàng Hsŭ

Japanese name
- Kanji: 張栩
- Kana: ちょう う
Transcriptions
- Romanization: Chō U

Cho U (simplified Chinese: 张栩; traditional Chinese: 張栩; pinyin: Zhāng Xǔ; Wade–Giles: Chang Hsu; born on 20 January 1980) is a Taiwanese professional Go player. He currently ranks 6th in the most titles won by a Japanese professional; his NEC Cup win in 2011 put him past his teacher Rin Kaiho and Norimoto Yoda. Cho is the first player in history to have held five of the top seven major titles simultaneously with Iyama Yuta being the second. Cho U, Naoki Hane, Keigo Yamashita and Shinji Takao make up the group of players in Japan called the "Four Heavenly Kings". His wife is one of Japan's best female go professionals, Izumi Kobayashi, the great Kitani's granddaughter and daughter of Kobayashi Koichi.

== Biography ==
Cho U was born in Taipei, Taiwan. He began playing poker and bridge as a young child. Cho's father Chang Yuen-hsi taught him to play Go, and he began beating family members by the age of three. He credits Shen Chun-shan as one of his early Go teachers; he first played against Shen at age seven. Shen was impressed by the young Cho's skill and introduced his family to Rin Kaiho.

He earned a spot in the 13th Fujitsu Cup in 2000 through the qualifying tournament. In his first game, Cho defeated Dutch amateur 7 dan Rob van Zeijst. In the second round, Cho defeated former number one Chinese representative Ma Xiaochun. Cho lost to Mok Jin-seok in the quarter-finals. In May 2000, Cho won a place in the 25th Kisei, the first edition to feature a league system. Cho was the youngest player in the league at 20 years. He finished the league with a record of three wins and three losses. Later in the year, Cho qualified for the 56th Honinbo league. He missed out on qualifying for the 26th Meijin league when he lost to Hideki Komatsu in the last qualifying round. Cho finished the year with the second best record behind Keigo Yamashita with 53 wins, 12 losses and one jigo. He also won the Kido award for the best winning percentage (81.1%). Cho was promoted to 7 dan on 16 April 2001.

Cho finished the 56th Honinbo league with a record of five wins and two losses. In an interview after his last match, Cho said "It feels strange to become the challenger after losing my game. I was really happy when I won five games in a row, but losing successive games leaves me with regrets. I'm very fortunate to be able to appear on the important stage of a best-of-seven title match." Cho won the first match, but title holder O Meien won the seventh and final game of the series. Cho collected ¥26,985,000 in prize money in 2001. In February 2002, Cho won one of Japan's seven non-seeded spots in the 1st World Oza. His first title came the following month when he won the 49th NHK Cup. Cho broke the record for youngest winner of the title. After winning the title, Go journalist John Power commented, "Cho U is surely going to develop into one of the dominant players on the Japanese go scene. He is calm, has excellent concentration and reads very well -- in fact, he seems to relish reading out difficult fights. Perhaps his greatest weapon may be his outstanding positional judgement: he is already reputed to be one of the fastest and most accurate players at summing up a position."

Cho was a member of the Japanese team in the 4th Nongshim Cup. In October 2002, Cho qualified for his first Meijin league. At the close of the 2002 season, Cho set a record with 70 wins in a year. He was awarded the Shusai Prize for his record-breaking year. After unsuccessfully challenging for the Honinbo title the previous year, Cho won his first major title on 11 July 2003 by defeating Kato Masao in six games for the 58th Honinbo. Cho set three records with his win: third youngest major title winner, second youngest Honinbo and youngest Japanese 9 dan. Cho met Masao Kato, the player he defeated for the Honinbo, twice more in 2003 when they faced off in the Agon Cup final and the Oza challenger final. Cho lost the Agon Cup final, but earned the right to face O Meien in the Oza final. Cho won the title in four games, making the Oza his second major title.

Cho would go on to win each major at least once: the Meijin in 2004, the Gosei in 2006, the Tengen in 2008, the Judan in 2009 and the Kisei in 2010. In 2004, Cho became the third player in history to earn over ¥100 million in a year, after Cho Chikun and Koichi Kobayashi. After defeating Yu Bin in the final of the 9th LG Cup, Cho U won his first international title and the first Japanese international win since Cho Chikun's Samsung Cup title in 2003. Cho lead the top prize winners list in 2010 with ¥90,499,000 ($1,120,250.25 as of 28 June 2011). In May 2011, Cho donated ¥15,000,000 from his Kisei prize money to victims of the 2011 Tōhoku earthquake and tsunami.

== Promotion record ==
Rank	Year	Notes
1 dan	1994	
2 dan	1994	
3 dan	1995	
4 dan	1996	
5 dan	1997	
6 dan	1999	
7 dan	2001	Defeated So Yokoku in an Oteai game.
8 dan	2003	Promoted from 7 dan to 8 dan for reaching the Honinbo finals.
9 dan	2003	Promoted from 8 dan to 9 dan for winning the 58th Honinbo.

== Career record ==
- 1999: 51–13
- 2000: 53–12–1
- 2001: 52–24
- 2002: 70–14
- 2004: 38–25
- 2006: 49–17
- 2007: 51–22
- 2008: 51–16
- 2009: 35–19
- 2010: 32–16
- 2011: 30–18
- 2012: 29–23
- 2013: 28–25
- 2014: 26–17
- 2015: 24–17
- 2016: 30–18

== Titles and runners-up ==
Ranks 7th in total number of titles won in Japan.

Domestic
Title	Wins	Runners-up
Kisei	3 (2010–2012)	1 (2013)
Meijin	5 (2004, 2005, 2007, 2008, 2018)	3 (2006, 2009, 2019)
Honinbo	2 (2003, 2004)	2 (2001, 2005)
Tengen	1 (2008)	1 (2009)
Oza	7 (2003–2005, 2008–2011)	3 (2006, 2012, 2013)
Judan	2 (2009, 2010)	3 (2004, 2011, 2012)
Gosei	4 (2006–2009)	1 (2010)
Agon Cup	4 (2006–2008, 2012, 2019)	3 (2002, 2003, 2009)
Ryusei	2 (2006, 2007)	4 (2001, 2005, 2008, 2009)
NHK Cup	4 (2002, 2005, 2008, 2016)	
Shinjin-O	1 (2002)	
NEC Cup	3 (2005, 2007, 2011)	1 (2009)
Daiwa Cup		2 (2006, 2010)
Daiwa Cup Grand Champion		2 (2008, 2011)
JAL Super Hayago Championship		1 (2003)
Total	38	27
Continental
China-Japan Agon Cup	1 (2019)	4 (2006–2008, 2012)
Total	1	4
International
Asian TV Cup	1 (2005)	
LG Cup	1 (2005)	
World Oza		1 (2006)
Total	2	1
Career total
Total	41	32
