= Gosei (competition) =

Japanese Go competition

- Full name: Gosei
- Started: 1976
- Honorary Winners: Ōtake Hideo; Kobayashi Kōichi; Iyama Yuta
- Sponsors: Regional Newspaper League
- Prize money: 8 million yen
- Affiliation: Nihon Ki-in

The Gosei (碁聖, literally Go sage) is a Go competition in Japan or a title of the competition's winner.

== Outline ==
Gosei is a Go competition used by the Japanese Nihon Ki-in and Kansai Ki-in. It is one of the seven big titles in Japan, although it pays much less than the top three. The winner's prize is 8,000,000 yen. Gosei uses the same format as the other big seven. The winner of the knockout tournament faces the title holder in a best of five match. There is one restriction that the other titles don't have, and that is to be able to enter the Gosei tournament, a player must be at least 5 dan.

The promotion rules are just like the Judan's. If the player gets to challenge the title holder, they are promoted to 7 dan. If that player wins the title match, they are promoted to 8 dan. If the player subsequently wins another of the second tier top titles (Judan, Oza, Tengen), the player will be promoted to 9 dan.

== Winners and runners-up ==
| | Year | Winner | Score | Runner-up |
|---|---|---|---|---|
| 1. | 1976 | Kato Masao | 3–2 | Otake Hideo |
| 2. | 1977 | Kato Masao | 3–0 | Takemiya Masaki |
| 3. | 1978 | Otake Hideo | 3–1 | Kato Masao |
| 4. | 1979 | Cho Chikun | 3–0 | Otake Hideo |
| 5. | 1980 | Otake Hideo | 3–1 | Cho Chikun |
| 6. | 1981 | Otake Hideo | 3–1 | Kato Masao |
| 7. | 1982 | Otake Hideo | 3–2 | Cho Chikun |
| 8. | 1983 | Otake Hideo | 3–2 | Awaji Shuzo |
| 9. | 1984 | Otake Hideo | 3–1 | Kato Masao |
| 10. | 1985 | Otake Hideo | 3–1 | Kudo Norio |
| 11. | 1986 | Cho Chikun | 3–0 | Otake Hideo |
| 12. | 1987 | Kato Masao | 3–1 | Cho Chikun |
| 13. | 1988 | Kobayashi Koichi | 3–0 | Kato Masao |
| 14. | 1989 | Kobayashi Koichi | 3–1 | Imamura Toshiya |
| 15. | 1990 | Kobayashi Koichi | 3–0 | Kobayashi Satoru |
| 16. | 1991 | Kobayashi Koichi | 3–2 | Kobayashi Satoru |
| 17. | 1992 | Kobayashi Koichi | 3–1 | Kobayashi Satoru |
| 18. | 1993 | Kobayashi Koichi | 3–0 | Rin Kaiho |
| 19. | 1994 | Rin Kaiho | 3–1 | Kobayashi Koichi |
| 20. | 1995 | Kobayashi Satoru | 3–2 | Rin Kaiho |
| 21. | 1996 | Yoda Norimoto | 3–0 | Kobayashi Satoru |
| 22. | 1997 | Yoda Norimoto | 3–1 | Yuki Satoshi |
| 23. | 1998 | Yoda Norimoto | 3–0 | Sonoda Yuichi |
| 24. | 1999 | Kobayashi Koichi | 3–2 | Yoda Norimoto |
| 25. | 2000 | Yamashita Keigo | 3–2 | Kobayashi Koichi |
| 26. | 2001 | Kobayashi Koichi | 3–2 | Yamashita Keigo |
| 27. | 2002 | Kobayashi Koichi | 3–1 | Yuki Satoshi |
| 28. | 2003 | Yoda Norimoto | 3–2 | Kobayashi Koichi |
| 29. | 2004 | Yoda Norimoto | 3–1 | Yamada Kimio |
| 30. | 2005 | Yoda Norimoto | 3–0 | Yuki Satoshi |
| 31. | 2006 | Cho U | 3–0 | Yoda Norimoto |
| 32. | 2007 | Cho U | 3–0 | Yokota Shigeaki |
| 33. | 2008 | Cho U | 3–1 | Yamashita Keigo |
| 34. | 2009 | Cho U | 3–0 | Yuki Satoshi |
| 35. | 2010 | Sakai Hideyuki | 3–2 | Cho U |
| 36. | 2011 | Hane Naoki | 3–2 | Sakai Hideyuki |
| 37. | 2012 | Iyama Yuta | 3–0 | Hane Naoki |
| 38. | 2013 | Iyama Yuta | 3–2 | Kono Rin |
| 39. | 2014 | Iyama Yuta | 3–2 | Kono Rin |
| 40. | 2015 | Iyama Yuta | 3–1 | Yamashita Keigo |
| 41. | 2016 | Iyama Yuta | 3–0 | Murakawa Daisuke |
| 42. | 2017 | Iyama Yuta | 3–0 | Yamashita Keigo |
| 43. | 2018 | Kyo Kagen | 3–0 | Iyama Yuta |
| 44. | 2019 | Hane Naoki | 3–2 | Kyo Kagen |
| 45. | 2020 | Ichiriki Ryo | 3–0 | Hane Naoki |
| 46. | 2021 | Iyama Yuta | 3–2 | Ichiriki Ryo |
| 47. | 2022 | Iyama Yuta | 3–0 | Ichiriki Ryo |
| 48. | 2023 | Iyama Yuta | 3–0 | Ichiriki Ryo |
| 49. | 2024 | Iyama Yuta | 3–0 | Shibano Toramaru |
| 50. | 2025 | Iyama Yuta | 3–2 | Shibano Toramaru |

== See also ==
- Honorary Gosei
