= Takao Shinji =

Japanese professional Go player (born 1976)

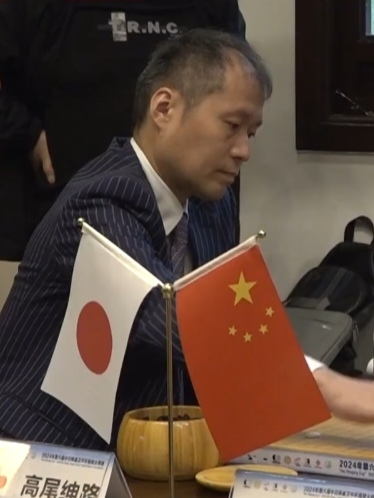
- Takao at 2024 6th Nie Weiping Cup

Personal information
- Native name: 高尾紳路 (Japanese)
- Full name: Takao Shinji
- Born: October 26, 1976 (age 49) Chiba, Japan

Sport
- Turned pro: 1991
- Teacher: Hideyuki Fujisawa
- Rank: 9 dan
- Affiliation: Nihon Ki-in; Tokyo branch

Takao Shinji
Medal record

Representing Japan

Asian Games
Bronze medal – third place	2010 Guangzhou	Men's Team

Takao Shinji (高尾紳路, Takao Shinji; born October 26, 1976) is a Japanese professional Go player.

== Biography ==
Takao Shinji is one of Japan's best Go players. He turned professional in 1991. He won the Honinbo tournament in 2005 by a half point in the last game. Cho U, Naoki Hane, Keigo Yamashita and Takao make up the group of players in Japan called the "Four Heavenly Kings". He was a student of Fujisawa Shuko, 9P.

== Rivalry with Keigo Yamashita ==
Takao’s rivalry with Keigo began in August 1986 during a televised match. The match was the final of the All-Japan Elementary School Championship, where an 8 year-old Keigo defeated a 9 year-old Shinji to capture the title. Their rivalry would continue on, striking again in 1996 when Shinji got his revenge. Takao beat Yamashita in the Shinjin-O semi-final, going on to defeat Nakamura Shinya in the final. In 1998, this time in the final of the Shinjin-O, Yamashita beat Takao 2-1 to capture the title. Their title matches would continue to go back and forth, with Takao getting the latest strike by beating Yamashita in the challenger’s final for the Judan in 2003.

== Titles and runners-up ==
Domestic
Title	Wins	Runners-up
Kisei		1 (2012)
Meijin	2 (2006, 2016)	4 (2007, 2010, 2015, 2017)
Honinbo	3 (2005–2007)	3 (2008, 2009, 2013)
Tengen	1 (2014)	1 (2015)
Judan	2 (2008, 2014)	2 (2003, 2009)
Agon Cup		2 (1999, 2017)
Ryusei	2 (2000, 2004)	
Shinjin-O	1 (1996)	2 (1998, 2002)
NEC Cup	1 (2012)	2 (2003, 2007)
Daiwa Cup	1 (2007)	
Daiwa Cup Grand Champion	2 (2010, 2011)	
NEC Shun-Ei	2 (2000, 2002)	
Shin-Ei		1 (2000)
Total	15	18
