= Mizokami Tomochika =

Japanese Go player

Personal information
- Native name: 溝上知親 (Japanese)
- Full name: Mizokami Tomochika
- Born: June 22, 1977 (age 49) Sasebo, Japan

Sport
- Turned pro: 1993
- Teacher: Kikuchi Yasuro
- Rank: 9 dan
- Affiliation: Nihon Ki-in

Mizokami Tomochika (溝上知親, Mizokami Tomochika; born June 22, 1977) is a professional Go player.

== Biography ==
Mizokami Tomochika is part of the older class of players in the 6 - 9 dan range in Japan.

== Titles & runners-up ==
Title	Years Held
Current	1
(Japan) Shinjin-O	2004
Defunct	2
(Japan) Shin-Ei	2002
(Japan) NEC Shun-Ei	2001

Titles	Years Lost
Current	1
(Japan) NEC Shun-Ei	1998
