= Mimura Tomoyasu =

Japanese Go player

Personal information
- Native name: 三村智保 (Japanese)
- Full name: Mimura Tomoyasu
- Born: July 4, 1969 (age 56) Kitakyushu, Japan

Sport
- Turned pro: 1986
- Teacher: Hideyuki Fujisawa
- Pupil: Kondoh Toshiki
- Rank: 9 dan
- Affiliation: Nihon Ki-in

Mimura Tomoyasu (三村智保, Mimura Tomoyasu; born July 4, 1969) is a professional Go player.

== Biography ==
Mimura became a professional in 1986. He was promoted to 9 dan in 2000. He is married to Makihata Taeko.

== Promotion record ==
| Rank | Year | Notes |
|---|---|---|
| 1 dan | 1986 | |
| 2 dan | 1986 | |
| 3 dan | 1987 | |
| 4 dan | 1988 | |
| 5 dan | 1989 | |
| 6 dan | 1991 | |
| 7 dan | 1993 | |
| 8 dan | 1998 | |
| 9 dan | 2000 | |

== Titles and runners-up ==
| Title | Years Held |
|---|---|
| Current | 3 |
| (Japan) NHK Cup | 2003 |
| (Japan) Shinjin-O | 1994, 1995 |
| Defunct | 1 |
| (Japan) Shin-Ei | 1999 |

| Title | Years Lost |
|---|---|
| Current | 2 |
| (Japan) NEC Cup | 2004 |
| (Japan) Shinjin-O | 1993 |
| Defunct | 3 |
| (Japan) JAL Super Hayago Championship | 2004 |
| (Japan) Shin-Ei | 1996 |
| (Japan) NEC Shun-Ei | 1994 |
| Continental | 1 |
| (Japan) (South Korea) (China) (Taiwan) Asian TV Cup | 2003 |
