= Shinjin-O =

Japanese Go competition

- Started: 1976
- Prize money: 2,000,000 yen
- Affiliation: Nihon Ki-in

The Shinjin-Ō (Japanese: 新人王, しんじんおうせん, King of the New Stars) is a professional Go competition.

An annual Japanese tournament, it has been held continuously since 1976.

== Format ==
The Shinjin-Ō tournament is organised by the Japanese Nihon Ki-in. The tournament started in 1976 and is only open to players under 7-Dan and below 30 years of age. It is a single knockout tournament.

In 2006, the tournament was renamed the Shinjin-Ō U-25 (King of the New Stars U-25) and the age restriction was lowered to 25. The original thinking time was 4 hours but, along with the new age restriction, the time was shortened to 3 hours. The winner's purse is 2,000,000 yen.

== Past winners ==
Player	Years Held
Kobayashi Koichi	1976, 1977
Ishida Akira	1978, 1979
Miyazawa Goro	1980, 1985
Ō Rissei	1981
Kataoka Satoshi	1982
Yoda Norimoto	1983, 1986, 1987, 1989, 1990
Toshiya Imamura	1984
Hideki Komatsu	1988, 1992
Cho Sonjin	1991
Satoshi Yuki	1993
Tomoyasu Mimura	1994, 1995
Shinji Takao	1996
Kimio Yamada	1997
Keigo Yamashita	1998 - 2001
Cho U	2002
So Yokoku	2003
Tomochika Mizokami	2004
Kim Shushun	2005
Takehisa Matsumoto	2006
Iyama Yuta	2007
Uchida Shuhei	2008
Ri Ishu	2009
Shiraishi Yuichi	2010
Murakawa Daisuke	2011
Kanazawa Makoto	2012
Fujita Akihiko	2013
Ichiriki Ryo	2014
Hsu Chia Yuan	2015
Onishi Ryuhei	2016
Shibano Toramaru	2017
Hirose Yuichi	2018
Son Makoto	2019
Kotaro Seki	2020
Sebun Sotoyanagi	2021
Sakai Yuki	2022
Ueno Asami	2023
Miura Taro	2024
Hsiao Yu-yang	2025

== See also ==
- List of professional Go tournaments
