= Satoshi Kataoka =

Japanese Go player

Personal information
- Native name: 片岡聡 (Japanese)
- Full name: Satoshi Kataoka
- Born: August 3, 1958 (age 67) Matsuda, Japan

Sport
- Turned pro: 1972
- Teacher: Sakakibara Shoji
- Rank: 9 dan
- Affiliation: Nihon Ki-in

Satoshi Kataoka (片岡聡, born August 3, 1958) is a professional Go player.

== Biography ==
Kataoka became a pro in 1972 at the age of 14. He was promoted to 9 dan in 1988.

== Promotion record ==
Rank	Year	Notes
1 dan	1972	
2 dan	1973	
3 dan	1975	
4 dan	1976	
5 dan	1977	
6 dan	1981	
7 dan	1982	
8 dan	1985	
9 dan	1988	

== Titles & runners-up ==
Title	Years Held
Current	3
(Japan) Tengen	1982, 1983
(Japan) Shinjin-O	1982
Defunct	3
(Japan) Kakusei	1990
(Japan) Hayago Championship	1993, 1998

Title	Years Lost
Current	4
(Japan) Honinbo	1994
(Japan) Tengen	1979, 1984, 1993
