= Satoru Kobayashi (Go player) =

Japanese Go player

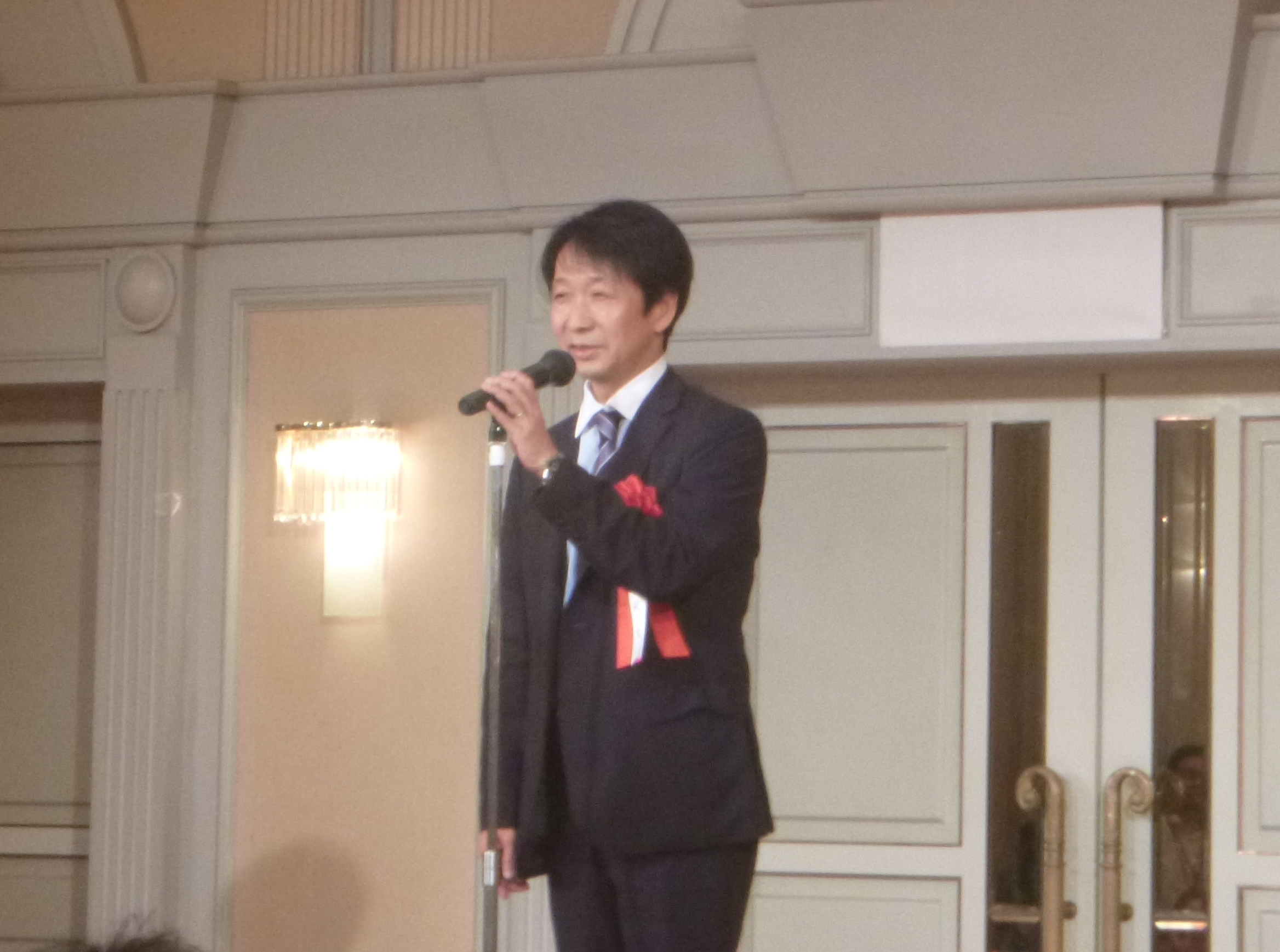
- Satoru Kobayashi

Personal information
- Native name: 小林覚 (Japanese)
- Full name: Satoru Kobayashi
- Born: April 5, 1959 (age 67) Matsumoto, Japan

Sport
- Turned pro: 1974
- Teacher: Minoru Kitani
- Rank: 9 dan
- Affiliation: Nihon Ki-in

Satoru Kobayashi (小林覚, Kobayashi Satoru; born April 5, 1959) is a professional Go player.

== Biography ==
Satoru Kobayashi is a professional Go player, who plays for the Japanese Nihon Ki-in. His rank is 9 dan, and he is known for his pincer style. He has one brother and sister, who are also professionals - Chizu Kobayashi and Kenji Kobayashi. He is unrelated to Koichi Kobayashi.

== Suspension ==
In the beginning of 2001, Kobayashi was suspended by the Nihon Ki-in. He had accidentally injured his Chunlan Cup opponent Ryu Shikun while they were drinking at a bar, by gesturing with his hand while it held a brandy glass, breaking the glass, gashing Ryu Shikun's cheek and his own hand. Kobayashi offered to retire from Go, but the Nihon Ki-in set that offer aside. The Chinese and Koreans both pleaded for clemency toward him; the suspension was shortened from a year to 8 months, and Kobayashi was allowed to play in September.

== Promotion record ==
Rank	Year	Notes
1 dan	1974	
2 dan		
3 dan		
4 dan		
5 dan		
6 dan		
7 dan		
8 dan		
9 dan	1987	

== Titles and runners-up ==
Domestic
Title	Wins	Runners-up
Kisei	1 (1995)	3 (1996, 1997, 2007)
Meijin		1 (2005)
Gosei	1 (1995)	4 (1990–1992, 1996)
Agon Cup	1 (1998)	2 (1995, 2005)
Ryusei	1 (1996)	
NHK Cup	1 (1995)	2 (1989, 1996)
NEC Cup	1 (1998)	3 (1985, 1996, 2006)
Kakusei		1 (1996)
Shin-Ei	1 (1982)	1 (1985)
NEC Shun-Ei	1 (1987)	
Hayago Championship	1 (2000)	
Igo Masters Cup	2 (2013, 2017)	1 (2014)
Total	11	18
Continental
Asian TV Cup		1 (1989)
Total	0	1
International
Samsung Cup		1 (1997)
Tong Yang Cup		1 (1997)
IBM Cup	1 (1990)	
Total	1	2
Career total
Total	11	21
