= Wang Ming-wan =

Taiwanese Go player

Personal information
- Native name: Trad. 王銘琬 Simp. 王铭琬 (Chinese); Wáng Míngwǎn (Pinyin)
- Full name: Wang Ming-wan
- Born: November 22, 1961 (age 64) Tainan, Taiwan

Sport
- Turned pro: 1977
- Teacher: Tomita Tadao
- Rank: 9 dan
- Affiliation: Nihon Ki-in; Tokyo branch

Wang Ming-wan (simplified Chinese: 王铭琬; traditional Chinese: 王銘琬; pinyin: Wáng Míngwǎn; born November 22, 1961), also known as O Meien, is a professional Go player.

== Biography ==
Wang was born in Tainan, Taiwan. He is known for his quick fuseki and fighting ability. He became a pro in 1977, two years after moving to Japan. He advanced to 9 dan in 1992.

== Titles and runners-up ==
Title	Years Held
Current	4
(Japan) Honinbo	2000, 2001
(Japan) Oza	2002
(Japan) Daiwa Cup	2007
Defunct	2
(Japan) NEC Shun-Ei	1989, 1991

Title	Years Lost
Current	5
(Japan) Honinbo	2002
(Japan) Oza	2003
(Japan) Shinjin-O	1987
(Japan) NHK Cup	1991
(Japan) Ryusei	2002
Defunct	2
(Japan) NEC Shun-Ei	1986, 1987
