= Naoki Hane =

Japanese Go player

Personal information
- Native name: 羽根直樹 (Japanese); ハネナオキ (Japanese)
- Full name: Naoki Hane
- Born: August 14, 1976 (age 49) Mie, Japan

Sport
- Turned pro: 1991
- Teacher: Yasumasa Hane
- Rank: 9 dan
- Affiliation: Nihon Ki-in, Chubu branch

Naoki Hane (羽根 直樹, Hane Naoki; born 14 August 1976) is a professional Japanese 9 dan Go player currently affiliated with the Nihon Ki-in. He is both the son and student of Yasumasa Hane 9 dan.

== Titles and runners-up ==
Ranks 13th in total number of titles won in Japan.

Domestic
Title	Wins	Runners-up
Kisei	2 (2004, 2005)	1 (2006)
Honinbo	2 (2008, 2009)	2 (2010, 2011)
Tengen	3 (2001–2003)	1 (2004)
Oza		1 (2011)
Gosei	1 (2011)	1 (2012)
Agon Cup	2 (2004, 2009)	1 (2006)
Ryusei		1 (2003)
NHK Cup	1 (2006)	2 (2002, 2012)
Shinjin-O		2 (1999, 2000)
NEC Cup	1 (2009)	1 (2010)
Okan	8 (1999, 2002–2004, 2007–2009, 2011)	3 (2000, 2005, 2010)
Kakusei		1 (2003)
NEC Shun-Ei		1 (2000)
Shin-Ei	1 (1996)	
Total	21	18
Continental
China-Japan Tengen	1 (2002)	
China-Japan Agon Cup		2 (2004, 2009)
Total	1	2
International
Chunlan Cup		1 (2003)
Total	0	1
Career total
Total	22	21

== Promotion record ==
Rank	Year	Notes
1 dan	1991	
2 dan	1991	
3 dan	1992	
4 dan	1992	
5 dan	1994	
6 dan	1996	
7 dan	1998	
8 dan	2000	
9 dan	2002	Reached 9 dan in 11 years and 3 months, a Nihon Ki-in record for second fastest promotion.

== Awards ==
- Reached 500 career wins in 2002.
- Reached 600 career wins in 2005.
- New Player Award once (1995)
- Most wins; 48 (1996), 50 (1997), 68 (2001)
- Most consecutive wins; 19 (1999)
- Best Player Award twice (2001, 2003)
- Most games played; 88 (2001)
- Hidetoshi Prize once (2001)
