= Yoda Norimoto =

Japanese Go player

Personal information
- Native name: 依田紀基 (Japanese)
- Full name: Yoda Norimoto
- Born: February 11, 1966 (age 60) Iwamizawa, Japan

Sport
- Turned pro: 1980
- Teacher: Takeo Ando
- Rank: 9 dan
- Affiliation: Nihon Ki-in

Yoda Norimoto (依田 紀基, Yoda Norimoto; born February 11, 1966 in Iwamizawa, Japan) is a professional Go player.

== Biography ==
Yoda is a student of Takeo Ando. He has won 35 titles so far in his career, the seventh highest in Japan. He became a professional in 1980, and reached 9 dan in 1993. In 2006, he was the heart of the Japanese team in international tournaments, steering them to a win over Team Korea in the 7th Nongshim Cup.

In June 2017, Yoda scored his 1,100th win as a pro. He has 572 losses, two jigos, and two no-results. He is the 12th Nihon Ki-in player to reach 1,100 victories. At 51 years four months, he is the third youngest, and, at 37 years two months, the 4th quickest to do so.

== Titles and runners-up ==
Ranks #8-t in the total number of titles in Japan.

Domestic
Title	Wins	Runners-up
Kisei		2 (1998, 2009)
Meijin	4 (2000–2003)	2 (1999, 2004)
Honinbo		2 (2004, 2007)
Judan	2 (1995, 1996)	1 (1997)
Gosei	6 (1996–1998, 2003–2005)	1 (2006)
Agon Cup	1 (1997)	1 (1996)
NHK Cup	5 (1991, 1993, 1998–2000)	1 (2005)
Shinjin-O	5 (1983, 1986, 1987, 1989, 1990)	1 (1982)
NEC Cup	3 (1992, 1997, 2002)	2 (1988, 1989)
Daiwa Cup		1 (2007)
Kakusei	1 (2002)	1 (2001)
Hayago Championship		2 (1993, 1996)
Shin-Ei	2 (1986, 1987)	2 (1984, 1989)
NEC Shun-Ei	1 (1986)	
Total	30	19
Continental
Japan-Korea rookie competition	1 (1991)	
Asian TV Cup	3 (1993, 1998, 1999)	
Teda Cup		1 (2004)
Total	4	1
International
Ing Cup		1 (1996)
Samsung Cup	1 (1996)	
Fujitsu Cup		1 (2004)
Tong Yang Cup		1 (1994)
Total	1	3
Career total
Total	35	23

== Appearance in Fiction ==
The climactic go game played between the fictional players Fujiwara-no-Sai and Toya Meijin in the anime and manga series Hikaru no Go was in fact a real 1997 game between Yoda Norimoto and Rin Kaiho. Yoda played the winning white side attributed to Sai.
