= Keigo Yamashita =

Japanese Go player (born 1978)

Personal information
- Native name: 山下敬吾 (Japanese)
- Full name: Keigo Yamashita
- Born: 6 September 1978 (age 47) Asahikawa City, Japan

Sport
- Turned pro: 1993
- Teacher: Yasuro Kikuchi
- Rank: 9 dan
- Affiliation: Nihon Ki-in, Tokyo branch

Keigo Yamashita
Medal record

Representing Japan

Asian Games
Bronze medal – third place	2010 Guangzhou	Men's Team

Keigo Yamashita (山下敬吾, やました けいご、, Yamashita Keigo; born 6 September 1978) is a professional Go player. Yamashita adopted the name Honinbo Dowa after winning his first Honinbo title in 2010.

== Biography ==
A student of Yasuro Kikuchi, Yamashita turned professional in 1993. He won the 19th Kisei 2 dan division in 1994. Yamashita reached the challenger finals of the Tengen in 1999. His first major title came in 2000 when he defeated Honorary Gosei Koichi Kobayashi in the finals of the 25th Gosei. At the time of his win, Yamashita was the second youngest player to win a major title. He also won the Shusai Prize for his play and broke the record for most games in a year with 77. Yamashita defeated O Rissei for the Kisei in 2003, becoming the fourth youngest big-three (Kisei, Meijin, Honinbo) winner at 24.

== Promotion record ==
Rank	Year	Notes
1 dan	1993	
2 dan	1993	
3 dan	1995	
4 dan	1996	
5 dan	1997	
6 dan	1998	
7 dan	2000	
8 dan		
9 dan	2003	Promoted from 7 dan to 9 dan for winning the Kisei.

== Career record ==
- 1993: 21–7
- 1999: 55–12
- 2000: 58–17
- 2001: 50–19
- 2004: 39–32
- 2005: 33–20
- 2006: 44–24
- 2007: 32–25
- 2008: 27–24
- 2009: 38–17
- 2010: 40–23
- 2011: 32–20

== Titles and runners-up ==
Domestic
Title	Wins	Runners-up
Kisei	5 (2003, 2006–2009)	5 (2004, 2010, 2014, 2015, 2016)
Meijin	2 (2011, 2012)	2 (2003, 2013)
Honinbo	2 (2010, 2011)	2 (2012, 2015)
Tengen	2 (2004, 2009)	4 (2003, 2005–2007)
Oza	2 (2006, 2007)	3 (2004, 2005, 2008)
Judan		3 (2006, 2007, 2010)
Gosei	1 (2000)	4 (2001, 2008, 2015, 2017)
Agon Cup	1 (2010)	1 (2011)
Ryusei	2 (2010, 2013)	
Shinjin-O	4 (1998–2001)	
NEC Cup		1 (2011)
NEC Shun-Ei	1 (1999)	
Shin-Ei	1 (2000)	
Total	22	25
