= 2011 in go =

- Years in go: 2008 2009 2010 2011 2012 2013 2014
- Centuries: 20th century · 21st century · 22nd century
- Decades: 1980s 1990s 2000s 2010s 2020s 2030s 2040s
- Years: 2008 2009 2010 2011 2012 2013 2014

== Calendar ==
The following are the scheduled events of the ancient game of Go for the year 2011 throughout the world. Most of the Go tournaments are held in Asia.

=== January ===
- 14 – Choi Cheol-han defeats Kong Jie in the final game of the 12th Nongshim Cup, giving Team Korea the title.
- 27 – Choi Cheol-han sweeps Lee Taehyun to win the 15th Chunwon title.

=== February ===
- 14 – Choi Cheol-han defeats Lee Chang-ho three games to one in the 54th Guksu.
- 16 – Xie Yimin defends her title against Umezawa Yukari in the 14th Female Kisei.
- 18 – Rui Naiwei defeats Cho Hyeyeon to win the 12th Female Myungin, her seventh consecutive Female Myungin title.
- 23 – Piao Wenyao wins the 16th LG Cup, his first international tournament. Wenyao was promoted to 9 dan for winning.

=== March ===
- 2 – Li He wins the 2nd Female Mingren. Yang Dingxin wins the 5th RICOH Xinxiu Cup.
- 5 – Cho U wins the 30th NEC Cup, his third NEC Cup title.
- 7 – Kong Jie defeats Heo Yeongho in the final game of the 1st Zhaoshang Cup, propelling Team China to a 6–4 victory over Team Korea.
- 8 – Rui Naiwei wins the 16th Female Guksu, her third straight Female Guksu title.
- 11 – Gu Lingyi wins the 10th South-West Qiwang. Cho U wins the 35th Kisei.
- 18 – Fan Tingyu wins the 18th Xinren Wang.
- 20 – Li He wins her second title of the year after defeating Li Xiaoxi for the 5th Female Xinren Wang.
- 21 – Park Junghwan defeats Paek Hongsuk in the 29th KBS Cup finals.
- 25 – Xie Yimin keeps her Female Meijin title by beating Chiaki Mukai two to one in the finals of the 23rd Female Meijin.
- 26 – Takao Shinji becomes the 4th Daiwa Cup Grand Champion.
- 27 – Yamada Kimio wins the 58th NHK Cup.

=== April ===
- 5 – Lee Sedol defeats Kang Yootaek in the finals of the 6th Siptan.
- 7 – Pak Yeong-hun wins the 12th Maxim Cup.
- 9 – Li He's victory over Park Jieun completes the sweep for Team China in the 1st Huanglongshi Cup.
- 13 – Chen Yaoye defends his Tianyuan title by defeating Zhou Hexi two to zero in the finals of the 25th Tianyuan.
- 17 – Chen Shiyuan wins the Zhonghuan Cup.
- 24 – Tan Xiao wins the 11th RICOH Cup.
- 28 – Lee Sedol defeats Gu Li in the finals of the 3rd BC Card Cup.
- 29 – Iyama Yuta wins the 49th Judan, his second major title.

=== May ===
- 17 – Zhong Wenjing wins the 23rd CCTV Cup.
- 18 – Iyama Yuta defeats Gu Li and Lee Sedol to win the 1st Bosai Cup.
- 24 – Chen Shiyuan wins the 10th Tianyuan.

=== June ===
- 10 – Kong Jie defeats Paek Hongsuk in the final of the 23rd Asian TV Cup.
- 19 – Zhou Junxun wins the 11th Donggang Cup against Xiao Zhenghao.
- 30 – Lee Sedol wins the 8th Chunlan Cup, defeating Xie He 2–1.

=== July ===
- 18 – Xiao Zhenghao wins his first Siyuan Cup after besting Wang Yuanjun in the final.
- 21 – Honinbo Dowa Keigo Yamashita defends his Honinbo title by defeating Naoki Hane for the second term in-a-row.
- 23 – Cho Chikun, holder of most titles won in Nihon Ki-in history, wins the inaugural edition of the Igo Masters Cup.

=== August ===
- 14 – Park Junghwan becomes the youngest holder of the Fujitsu Cup after defeating Qiu Jun in the final.
- 20 – Pak Yeong-hun wins the 2nd World Meijin.
- 29 – Naoki Hane wins his first Gosei title by defeating previous holder Hideyuki Sakai.
- 30 – Lin Zhihan defends his Guoshou title against Xiao Zhenghao.

== Tournament results ==
International
Title	Winner	Score	Runner-up
BC Card Cup	(South Korea) Lee Sedol	3–2	(China) Gu Li
LG Cup	(China) Piao Wenyao	2–0	(China) Kong Jie
Samsung Cup	(South Korea) Won Seongjin	2–1	(China) Gu Li
Chunlan Cup	(South Korea) Lee Sedol	2–1	(China) Xie He
Fujitsu Cup	(South Korea) Park Junghwan	1–0	(China) Qiu Jun
Continental
Asian TV Cup	(China) Kong Jie	1–0	(South Korea) Paek Hongsuk
Nongshim Cup	(South Korea) Team Korea; Lee Chang-ho; Mok Jin-seok (1); Lee Sedol (2); Choi Cheol-han (4); Park Seunghwa		
Qionglong Cup	(South Korea) Park Jieun	1–0	(China) Tang Yi
Jeongganjang Cup	(South Korea) Team Korea; Park Jieun (1); Lee Hajin; Park Jiyeon; Moon Dowon (7); Kim Miri (1)		
Huanglongshi Cup	(China) Team China; Li He; Tang Yi; Chen Yiming	7–5	(South Korea) Team Korea; Park Jieun; Cho Hyeyeon; Park Jiyeon
World Meijin	(South Korea) Pak Yeong-hun	2–0	
Bosai Cup	(Japan) Iyama Yuta	1–0	(China) Gu Li
China-Japan Agon Cup	(China) Piao Wenyao	1–0	(Japan) Iyama Yuta
China-Korea Tengen	(China) Chen Yaoye	2–0	(South Korea) Choi Cheolhan
Japan-Taiwan Jingying	(Taiwan) Chen Shiyuan	1–0	(Taiwan) Lin Zhihan
Zhaoshang Cup	(China) Team China; Kong Jie; Gu Li; Xie He; Liu Xing; Zhou Ruiyang; Jiang Weijie	6–4	(South Korea) Team Korea; Choi Cheol-han; Pak Yeong-hun; Kang Dongyun; Park Junghwan; Heo Young-ho; Yun Junsang
Asian New Star Match	(China) Team China; Li Zhe; Shi Yue; Lian Xiao; Wang Tao; Yan Huan; Yang Dingxin; Tang Yi; Yu Zhiying		(South Korea) Team Korea; Park Junghwan; Kang Yootaek; Kim Junghyun; Lee Jihyun; Lee Taehyun; Na Hyun; Kim Miri; Choi Jeong
China
Mingren	Jiang Weijie	3–2	Kong Jie
Tianyuan	Chen Yaoye	2–0	Zhou Hexi
Chang-ki Cup	Gu Li	2–0	Liu Xing
Ahan Tongshan Cup	Piao Wenyao	1–0	Chen Yaoye
RICOH Cup	Tan Xiao	1–0	Li Zhe
Qiwang	Tan Xiao	1–0	Wang Lei
Longchen			
CCTV Cup	Zhong Wenjing	1–0	Wang Lei
South-West Qiwang	Gu Lingyi	1–0	Dang Yifei
Xinren Wang	Fan Tingyu	2–0	Mao Ruilong
RICOH Xinxiu Cup	Yang Dingxin	1–0	Fan Tingyu
Female Mingren	Li He	1–0	Chen Yiming
Jianqiao Cup	Zhang Xiang	2–0	Cao Youyin
Chinese A League			
Japan
Kisei	Cho U	4–2	Yuta Iyama
Meijin	Keigo Yamashita	4–2	Yuta Iyama
Honinbo	Keigo Yamashita	4–3	Naoki Hane
Tengen	Yuta Iyama	3–0	Satoshi Yuki
Oza	Cho U	3–0	Naoki Hane
Judan	Yuta Iyama	3–2	Cho U
Gosei	Naoki Hane	3–2	Hideyuki Sakai
Agon Cup	Yuta Iyama	1–0	Keigo Yamashita
Ryusei	Yuta Iyama	1–0	Satoshi Yuki
NHK Cup	Kimio Yamada	1–0	Norimoto Yoda
Shinjin-O	Daisuke Murakawa	1–0	Nobuaki Anzai
Hiroshima-Aluminium Cup	Shuhei Uchida	1–0	Tatsuya Shida
NEC Cup	Cho U	1–0	Keigo Yamashita
Okan	Naoki Hane	1–0	Hiroshi Yamashiro
Kansai Ki-in 1st Place	Hideyuki Sakai	2–0	Daisuke Murakawa
1st Igo Masters Cup	Cho Chikun	1–0	Koichi Kobayashi
Female Honinbo	Xie Yimin	3–1	Chiaki Mukai
Female Meijin	Xie Yimin	2–1	Chiaki Mukai
Female Kisei	Xie Yimin	2–0	Yukari Yoshihara
Daiwa Cup			
Grand Champion	Takao Shinji	1–0	Cho U
Korea
Guksu	Choi Cheol-han	3–1	Lee Chang-ho
Myungin	Pak Yeong-hun	3–1	Paek Hongsuk
Siptan	Lee Sedol	2–1	Kang Yootaek
GS Caltex Cup	Park Junghwan	3–0	Pak Yeong-hun
Prices Information Cup	Lee Younggu	2–1	Yun Junsang
Chunwon	Choi Cheol-han	2–0	Yun Junsang
KBS Cup	Park Junghwan	2–0	Paek Hongsuk
1st Shinin-Wang	Kang Yootaek	2–0	Lee Donghoon
Maxim Cup	Pak Yeong-hun	2–0	Lee Chang-ho
Daejoo Cup	Cho Hunhyun	2–0	Seo Bongsoo
Female Myungin	Rui Naiwei	2–1	Cho Hyeyeon
Female Guksu	Rui Naiwei	2–0	Kim Yunyoung
Female Kisung	Rui Naiwei	1–0	Choi Jeong
GG Auction Cup	Team Senior		
Korean Baduk League			
Taiwan
Qiwang	Chen Shiyuan	4–3	Zhou Junxun
Tianyuan	Chen Shiyuan	3–1	Xiao Zhenghao
Wangzuo			
Guoshou	Lin Zhihan	3–0	Xiao Zhenghao
Haifong Cup	Lin Zhihan	2–0	Zhou Junxun
Qisheng			
Zhonghuan Cup	Chen Shiyuan	1–0	Lin Shuyang
Aixin Cup			
Donggang Cup	Zhou Junxun	1–0	Xiao Zhenghao
Siyuan Cup	Xiao Zhenghao	1–0	Wang Yuanjun

== See also ==
- List of Go organizations
- Go players
- Go professionals
