= 11th Ricoh Cup =

The 11th RICOH Cup began on 9 December 2010 and concluded on 24 April 2011. Tan Xiao defeated Li Zhe in the final.

== Tournament ==
Round of 16
9 December
Zhang Li	0
Kong Jie	1
9 December
Niu Yutian	0
Qiu Jun	1
9 December
Luo Xihe	0
Wang Xi	1
9 December
Yang Dingxin	0
Wang Lei	1
9 December
Yu Bin	0
Li Zhe	1
9 December
Zhong Wenjing	0
Tuo Jiaxi	1
9 December
Wang Yao	0
Shi Yue	1
9 December
Meng Tailing	1
Zhou Ruiyang	0

Quarter-finals
5 January
Kong Jie	1
Qiu Jun	0
18 January
Wang Xi	0
Wang Lei	1
18 January
Li Zhe	1
Tuo Jiaxi	0
18 January
Shi Yue	1
Meng Tailing	0

Semi-finals
28 February
Kong Jie	0
Wang Lei	1
20 January
Li Zhe	1
Shi Yue	0

Final
2 March
Wang Lei	0
Li Zhe	1

Round of 16
21 December
Ding Wei	0
Gu Li	1
9 December
Zhou Heyang	0
Jiang Weijie	1
9 December
Hu Yaoyu	1
Piao Wenyao	0
9 December
Li Kang	1
Gu Lingyi	0
9 December
Tan Xiao	1
Chang Hao	0
9 December
Chun Guangya	0
Chen Yaoye	1
9 December
Dong Mengcheng	0
Liu Xing	1
9 December
Peng Quan	1
Xie He	0

Quarter-finals
18 January
Gu Li	0
Jiang Weijie	1
18 January
Hu Yaoyu	1
Li Kang	0
18 January
Tan Xiao	1
Chen Yaoye	0
18 January
Liu Xing	1
Peng Quan	0

Semi-finals
20 January
Jiang Weijie	0
Hu Yaoyu	1
20 January
Tan Xiao	1
Liu Xing	0

Final
2 March
Hu Yaoyu	0
Tan Xiao	1

== Final ==
Final
Li Zhe	0
Tan Xiao	1
