= 24th Mingren =

The 24th Mingren was held from March 2011 until the finals. The reigning title holder was Jiang Weijie, who defeated Gu Li 3–2 in the finals of the 23rd Mingren.

== Tournament ==
Round 1
Gu Li	1
Fang Jie	0
Li Kang	1
Han Han	0
Zhong Wenjing	0
Zhu Yuanhao	1
Kong Jie	1
Yang Yi	0
Tuo Jiaxi	1
Dang Yifei	0
Ding Wei	0
Zhang Li	1
Chen Yaoye	1
Zhang Wei	0
Xie He	1
Fan Tingyu	0
Zhou Ruiyang	1
Ding Lie	0
Wang Lei	0
Peng Quan	1
Chang Hao	1
Wang Haoyang	0
Piao Wenyao	1
Wang Xi	0
Qiu Jun	1
Meng Tailing	0
Gu Lingyi	1
Yang Dingxin	0
Zhou Heyang	1
Hu Yaoyu	0
Li Zhe	1
Shi Yue	0

Round 2
Gu Li	1
Li Kang	0
Zhu Yuanhao	0
Kong Jie	1
Dang Yifei	1
Zhang Li	0
Chen Yaoye	1
Xie He	0
Zhou Ruiyang	1
Peng Quan	0
Chang Hao	1
Piao Wenyao	0
Qiu Jun	0
Gu Lingyi	1
Zhou Heyang	0
Li Zhe	1

Quarter-finals
Gu Li
Kong Jie
Dang Yifei
Chen Yaoye
Zhou Ruiyang
Chang Hao
Gu Lingyi
Li Zhe

Semi-finals

Challenger decision match

== Challenger decision finals ==
Player	1	2	3	T
Player A
Player B

== Finals ==
Player	1	2	3	4	5	T
Jiang Weijie (Mingren)
Challenger

== See also ==
- For information on the preliminary rounds, see Igo-Kisen.
