= 15th LG Cup =

The 15th LG Cup began on 7 June 2010 and concluded on 23 February 2011. Piao Wenyao won the title, defeating compatriot Kong Jie in the final. 32 players from four countries competed in the final knockout tournament:

- China (16): Chang Hao, Chen Yaoye, Gu Li, Hu Yaoyu, Jiang Weijie, Kong Jie, Lian Xiao, Meng Tailing, Niu Yutian, Peng Quan, Piao Wenyao, Shi Yue, Tuo Jiaxi, Wang Xi, Wang Yao, Zhou Ruiyang
- Korea (11): An Choyoung, Choi Cheol-han, Heo Young-ho, Kim Jiseok, Lee Chang-ho, Lee Heesung, Lee Sedol, Mok Jin-seok, Paek Daehyun, Pak Yeong-hun, Park Junghwan
- Japan (4): Iyama Yuta, Takao Shinji, Yamada Kimio, Yoda Norimoto
- Taiwan (1): Xiao Zhenghao

== Tournament ==
First round (7 June)
(China) Kong Jie	1
(Japan) Yoda Norimoto	0
(China) Niu Yutian	0
(South Korea) Mok Jin-seok	1
(China) Chang Hao	1
(Japan) Takao Shinji	0
(South Korea) Lee Heesung	0
(China) Hu Yaoyu	1
(South Korea) Lee Sedol	0
(China) Gu Li	1
(China) Peng Quan	0
(South Korea) An Choyoung	1
(Japan) Iyama Yuta	0
(China) Lian Xiao	1
(South Korea) Heo Young-ho	0
(China) Meng Tailing	1
(South Korea) Lee Chang-ho	1
(China) Wang Xi	0
(South Korea) Baek Daehyun	0
(China) Tuo Jiaxi	1
(South Korea) Kim Jiseok	1
(China) Zhou Ruiyang	0
(South Korea) Pak Yeong-hun	0
(China) Wang Yao	1
(China) Jiang Weijie	0
(South Korea) Choi Cheol-han	1
(China) Shi Yue	1
(Taiwan) Xiao Zhenghao	0
(China) Chen Yaoye	1
(South Korea) Park Junghwan	0
(China) Piao Wenyao	1
(Japan) Yamada Kimio	0

Second round (9 June)
Kong Jie	1
Mok Jin-seok	0
Chang Hao	0
Hu Yaoyu	1
Gu Li	0
An Choyoung	1
Lian Xiao	0
Meng Tailing	1
Lee Chang-ho	1
Tuo Jiaxi	0
Kim Jiseok	0
Wang Yao	1
Choi Cheol-han	1
Shi Yue	0
Chen Yaoye	0
Piao Wenyao	1

Quarter-finals (8 November)
Kong Jie	1
Hu Yaoyu	0
An Choyoung	0
Meng Tailing	1
Lee Chang-ho	0
Wang Yao	1
Choi Cheol-han	0
Piao Wenyao	1

Semi-finals (10 November)
Kong Jie	1
Meng Tailing	0
Wang Yao	0
Piao Wenyao	1

Finals (21–24 February)
Kong Jie	0
Piao Wenyao	2
