= 16th LG Cup =

The 16th LG Cup began on 13 June 2011 and concluded on 15 February 2012. Jiang Weijie won the title, defeating Lee Chang-ho in the final. 32 players from four countries competed in the final knockout tournament:

- Korea (17): Cho Hanseung, Choi Cheol-han, Han Wonggyu, Heo Young-ho, Kang Dongyun, Kim Dongho, Kim Jiseok, Lee Chang-ho, Lee Sedol, Lee Wonyoung, Mok Jin-seok, Park Junghwan, Pak Yeong-hun, Park Jungsang, Park Seunghwa, Won Seong-jin, Yun Junsang
- China (10): Chen Yaoye, Gu Li, Jiang Weijie, Kong Jie, Piao Wenyao, Qiu Jun, Tan Xiao, Wang Xi, Xie He, Zhou Heyang
- Japan (4): Cho U, Iyama Yuta, Sakai Hideyuki, Yuki Satoshi
- Taiwan (1): Chen Shiyuan

== Tournament ==
1st round (13 June 2011)
(China) Piao Wenyao	1
(South Korea) Park Junghwan	0
(Japan) Yuki Satoshi	0
(South Korea) Kim Jiseok	1
(China) Chen Yaoye	0
(South Korea) Park Seunghwa	1
(Taiwan) Chen Shiyuan	1
(South Korea) Han Wonggyu	0
(South Korea) Won Seong-jin	1
(Japan) Sakai Hideyuki	0
(China) Zhou Heyang	1
(South Korea) Kim Dongho	0
(South Korea) Cho Hanseung	0
(China) Jiang Weijie	1
(South Korea) Mok Jin-seok	1
(China) Tan Xiao	0
(China) Kong Jie	0
(South Korea) Park Jungsang	1
(China) Wang Xi	0
(South Korea) Heo Young-ho	1
(South Korea) Lee Chang-ho	1
(China) Gu Li	0
(Japan) Iyama Yuta	1
(South Korea) Yun Junsang	0
(South Korea) Lee Wondo	0
(China) Xie He	1
(South Korea) Lee Sedol	0
(South Korea) Pak Yeong-hun	1
(South Korea) Kang Dongyun	0
(China) Qiu Jun	1
(Japan) Cho U	0
(South Korea) Choi Cheol-han	1

2nd round (15 June 2011)
Piao Wenyao	0
Kim Jiseok	1
Park Seunghwa	0
Chen Shiyuan	1
Won Seong-jin	1
Zhou Heyang	0
Jiang Weijie	1
Mok Jin-seok	0
Park Junsang	0
Heo Young-ho	1
Lee Chang-ho	1
Iyama Yuta	0
Xie He	1
Pak Yeong-hun	0
Qiu Jun	1
Choi Cheol-han	0

Quarter-finals (21 November 2011)
Kim Jiseok	1
Chen Shiyuan	0
Won Seong-jin	0
Jiang Weijie	1
Heo Young-ho	0
Lee Chang-ho	1
Xie He	1
Qiu Jun	0

Semi-finals (23 November 2011)
Kim Jiseok	0
Jiang Weijie	1
Lee Chang-ho	1
Xie He	0

Finals (13–15 February 2012)
Jiang Weijie	2
Lee Chang-ho	0
