= 3rd BC Card Cup World Baduk Championship =

The 3rd BC Card Cup World Baduk Championship began on 29 January 2011 and concluded 28 April 2011 with Lee Sedol winning his second straight title.

== Tournament ==
All players are representatives of South Korea unless otherwise noted.

Round of 64
(Taiwan) Chen Shien	1
Yun Junsang	0
Lee Hyeongjin	0
Park Seunghwa	1
Lee Sedol	1
Kim Jinhwi (A)	0
Choi Myung-Hoon	0
(China) Sun Li	1
(Japan) Cho Chikun	0
(China) Yan Huan	1
Min Sangyoun (A)	0
Kim Kiyoung	1
(China) Chen Yaoye	1
Kang Yootaek	0
Ryu Jaehyeong	1
Lee Hoseung (A)	0
(China) Chang Hao	0
Lee Younggu	1
On Sojin	1
(China) Jiang Weijie	0
Park Junghwan	1
Whang Jinhyung	0
Kim Sedong	0
Park Jihoon	1
(China) Zhou Ruiyang	1
Lee Sanghoon	0
(China) Peng Liyao	1
(China) Tang Weixing	0
(Japan) Sakai Hideyuki	0
Yoo Changhyuk	1
Han Sanghoon	0
Kim Seungjun	1

Round of 32
Chen Shien	0
Park Seunghwa	1
Lee Sedol	1
Sun Li	0
Yan Huan	0
Kim Kiyoung	1
Chen Yaoye	1
Ryu Jaehyeong	0
Lee Younggu	0
On Sojin	1
Park Junghwan	1
Park Jihoon	0
Zhou Ruiyang	1
Peng Liyao	0
Yoo Changhyuk	0
Kim Seungjun	1

Round of 16
Park Seunghwa	0
Lee Sedol	1
Kim Kiyoung	0
Chen Yaoye	1
On Sojin	0
Park Junghwan	1
Zhou Ruiyang	1
Kim Seungjun	0

Quarterfinals
Lee Sedol	1
Chen Yaoye	0
Park Junghwan	1
Zhou Ruiyang	0

Semifinals
Lee Sedol	1
Park Junghwan	0

Round of 64
(China) Kong Jie	0
(China) Tan Xiao	1
Seo Jongui	0
(China) Chun Guangya	1
(China) Piao Wenyao	0
(China) Zhong Wenjing	1
Han Taehee	0
Lee Jaewong	1
Heo Yeongho	1
Kim Kiwon	0
(China) Li Xuanhao	1
(China) Mao Ruilong	0
Choi Cheol-han	1
Choi Kyubyeong	0
(China) Zhou Hexi	1
Jin Donggyu	0
(China) Gu Li	1
(China) Fan Yunruo	0
(China) Dang Yifei	1
Lee Taehyun	0
Cho Hanseung	1
An Kukhyun	0
(China) Wang Lei	1
Song Tae Kon	0
Kim Jiseok	1
Park Jinsol	0
Kim Hyunseob	0
Hong Moojin (A)	1
Lee Chang-ho	1
(China) Peng Quan	0
Kim Juho	1
Park Junseok	0

Round of 32
Tan Xiao	1
Chun Guangya	0
Zhong Wenjing	1
Lee Jaewong	0
Heo Yeongho	1
Li Xuanhao	0
Choi Cheol-han	1
Zhou Hexi	0
Gu Li	1
Dang Yifei	0
Cho Hanseung	1
Wang Lei	0
Kim Jiseok	1
Hong Moojin	0
Lee Chang-ho	0
Kim Juho	1

Round of 16
Tan Xiao	0
Zhong Wenjing	1
Heo Yeongho	1
Choi Cheol-han	0
Gu Li	1
Cho Hanseung	0
Kim Jiseok	1
Kim Juho	0

Quarterfinals
Zhong Wenjing	0
Heo Yeongho	1
Gu Li	1
Kim Jiseok	0

Semifinals
Heo Yeongho	0
Gu Li	1

== Finals ==
Player	1	2	3	4	5	T
(South Korea) Lee Sedol		W+R	B+0.5		B+R	3
(China) Gu Li	W+R			B+R		2
