= 24th Fujitsu Cup =

The 24th Fujitsu Cup featured 32 players.

- Japan (13): Cho Chikun, O Meien, Ogata Masaki, Yuki Satoshi, Yamada Kimio, Hane Naoki, Takao Shinji, Yamashita Keigo, Cho U, Iyama Yuta, Sakai Hideyuki, Fujii Shuya, Seto Taiki
- Korea (7): Lee Sedol, Choi Cheol-han, Park Junghwan, Lee Younggu, Heo Yeongho, Kim Jiseok, Kang Yootaek
- China (8): Chang Hao, Kong Jie, Qiu Jun, Gu Li, Piao Wenyao, Xie He, Jiang Weijie, Tuo Jiaxi
- Taiwan (1): Chen Shien
- North America (1): Liu Zhiyuan
- South America (1): Fernando Aguilar
- Europe (1): Artem Kachanovskyi

== Tournament ==
Round 1
(Japan) Ogata Masaki
(South Korea) Park Junghwan
(Taiwan) Chen Shien
(Japan) Cho U
(China) Piao Wenyao
(South Korea) Heo Yeongho
(Japan) Hane Naoki
(Japan) Seto Taiki
(China) Tuo Jiaxi
(China) Chang Hao
(South Korea) Lee Younggu
(Japan) Sakai Hideyuki
(South Korea) Choi Cheol-han
(United States) Liu Zhiyuan
(China) Gu Li
(Japan) Iyama Yuta
(Japan) O Meien
(China) Qiu Jun
(Japan) Cho Chikun
(Japan) Yamashita Keigo
(Japan) Fujii Shuya
(Japan) Yamada Kimio
(South Korea) Lee Sedol
(Japan) Takao Shinji
(South Korea) Kang Yootaek
(China) Xie He
(China) Kong Jie
(Japan) Yuki Satoshi
(Argentina) Fernando Aguilar
(China) Jiang Weijie
(Ukraine) Artem Kachanovskyi
(South Korea) Kim Jiseok

Round 2
(South Korea) Park Junghwan	●
(Taiwan) Chen Shien	○
(China) Piao Wenyao	○
(Japan) Hane Naoki	●
(China) Tuo Jiaxi	○
(Japan) Sakai Hideyuki	●
(Japan) Iyama Yuta	●
(South Korea) Choi Cheol-han	○
(China) Qiu Jun	○
(Japan) Cho Chikun	●
(Japan) Fujii Shuya	●
(South Korea) Lee Sedol	○
(China) Xie He	●
(China) Kong Jie	○
(China) Jiang Weijie	●
(South Korea) Kim Jiseok	○

Quarter-finals
(South Korea) Park Junghwan	●
(China) Piao Wenyao	○
(Japan) Sakai Hideyuki	●
(Japan) Iyama Yuta	○
(China) Qiu Jun	●
(South Korea) Lee Sedol	○
(China) Xie He	○
(China) Jiang Weijie	●

Semi-finals
(South Korea) Park Junghwan	○
(Japan) Iyama Yuta	●
(China) Qiu Jun	○
(China) Jiang Weijie	●

Final
(South Korea) Park Junghwan	●+R
(China) Qiu Jun	○
