= Tang Weixing =

Chinese professional go player (born 1993)

Personal information
- Born: January 15, 1993 (age 33) Guiyang, Guizhou, China

Sport
- Turned pro: 2006
- Rank: 9 dan
- Affiliation: Chinese Weiqi Association

Tang Weixing
- Traditional Chinese: 唐韋星
- Simplified Chinese: 唐韦星
Transcriptions
Standard Mandarin
- Hanyu Pinyin: Táng Wéixīng

Tang Weixing (Chinese: 唐韦星; born 15 January 1993) is a Chinese professional go player. He has won three international titles, with two championships in the Samsung Cup (2013, 2019) and one in the Ing Cup (2016).

== Early life ==
Tang Weixing was born in Guiyang, Guizhou in 1993. His name is related to Go: The wei in his name, taken from his mother's surname, is a homophone of the wei in weiqi, while the xing in his name, meaning 'star', is in reference to the star points on a Go board. He began to learn Go when he was 5 years old. At the age of 7, he moved to Beijing with his father to further pursue his study of Go.

As an amateur player, he won two consecutive Chinese amateur Go championships at the 2004 and 2005 Wanbao Cup. He was China's representative at the 2006 World Amateur Go Championship, where he finished in second place. He earned professional 1 dan rank that same year, at age 13.

== Career ==
In 2013, Tang won the 18th Samsung Cup, his first international championship, defeating Lee Sedol 2–0 in the finals. Tang, who was 3 dan at the time, was promoted to 9 dan with the victory. His win capped off a year in which Chinese players swept every major international Go tournament. He finished as the runner-up in the 19th Samsung Cup in 2014, with a 2–0 loss to the champion Kim Ji-seok.

In 2016, he won his second international title in the 8th Ing Cup, beating runner-up Park Junghwan 3–2. He was the 22nd Samsung Cup runner-up in 2017, with a 2–1 loss to Gu Zihao. In 2019, he defeated Yang Dingxin to win the 24th Samsung Cup, marking his seventh consecutive quarterfinals appearance, fourth finals appearance, and second title at the Samsung Cup. He played his sixth major international title match in the 13th Chunlan Cup in 2021, and lost 2–0 to Shin Jin-seo.

== Promotion record ==
Rank	Year	Notes
1 dan	2006	Promoted to professional dan rank for performance in the Chinese professional qualification tournament.
2 dan	2007	Promoted for performance in the Chinese professional promotion tournament.
3 dan	2010	Promoted for performance in the Chinese professional promotion tournament.
4 dan	2013	Skipped due to the Chinese Weiqi Association promotion rules.
5 dan	2013	Skipped due to the Chinese Weiqi Association promotion rules.
6 dan	2013	Skipped due to the Chinese Weiqi Association promotion rules.
7 dan	2013	Skipped due to the Chinese Weiqi Association promotion rules.
8 dan	2013	Skipped due to the Chinese Weiqi Association promotion rules.
9 dan	2013	Won the 18th Samsung Cup against Lee Sedol.

== Career record ==
As of 1 August 2020

- 2006: 0 wins, 2 losses
- 2007: 11 wins, 8 losses
- 2008: 16 wins, 9 losses
- 2009: 17 wins, 11 losses
- 2010: 28 wins, 17 losses
- 2011: 29 wins, 22 losses
- 2012: 48 wins, 31 losses
- 2013: 56 wins, 30 losses
- 2014: 40 wins, 30 losses
- 2015: 34 wins, 25 losses
- 2016: 39 wins, 33 losses
- 2017: 29 wins, 27 losses
- 2018: 32 wins, 31 losses
- 2019: 17 wins, 24 losses
- 2020: 5 wins, 6 losses
- Total: 401 wins, 306 losses (56.7% winning percentage)

== Titles and runners-up ==
As of 1 August 2020

Domestic
Title	Wins	Runners-up
Liguang Cup		1 (2013)
Ahan Tongshan Cup		1 (2014)
Xinan Wang	2 (2014-2015)	
Tianyuan		1 (2016)
Baiyunshan Cup	1 (2016)	
Total	3	3
International
Title	Wins	Runners-up
Samsung Cup	2 (2013, 2019)	2 (2014, 2017)
Ing Cup	1 (2016)	
Total	3	2
Career total	6	5

== Head-to-head record vs selected players ==
As of 1 July 2018

Players who have won international go titles in bold.

- (China) **Shi Yue** 12:13
- (China) **Ke Jie** 7:11
- (South Korea) **Park Junghwan** 7:9
- (China) **Fan Tingyu** 8:6
- (China) Yang Dingxin 8:6
- (China) **Tan Xiao** 5:9
- (China) **Mi Yuting** 4:10
- (China) **Gu Zihao** 4:8
- (China) Wang Haoyang 5:6
- (China) **Jiang Weijie** 3:8
- (China) **Chen Yaoye** 1:10
- (China) **Tong Mengcheng** 7:3
- (South Korea) **Kim Jiseok** 4:6
- (China) **Tuo Jiaxi** 6:4
- (China) Li Xuanhao 6:3
- (China) Lian Xiao 6:3
- (China) Peng Liyao 5:4
- (South Korea) **Choi Cheolhan** 6:2
- (China) Fan Yunruo 7:1
- (China) **Dang Yifei** 4:4
- (China) **Wang Xi** 4:4
- (China) Gu Lingyi 5:2
- (China) Zhong Wenjing 5:2
- (China) Huang Yunsong 2:5
