= 10th South-West Qiwang =

The 10th South-West Qiwang began in March 2011 and concluded on 11 March 2011. The winner was Gu Lingyi, who defeated Dang Yifei in the final for his fourth South-West Qiwang title.

== Tournament ==
Round of 16
Nie Weiping	1
Li Haojie	0
Yang Yi	0
Shi Yue	1
Gu Lingyi	1
Sun Li	0
Gu Li	0
Yu Ping	1
Xie He	1
Fu Chong	0
Wang Xi	0
Dang Yifei	1
Wang Yao	1
Ke Jie	0
Li Jie	1
Li Zhe	0

Quarter-finals
10 March
Nie Weiping	0
Shi Yue	1
10 March
Gu Lingyi	1
Yu Ping	0
10 March
Xie He	0
Dang Yifei	1
10 March
Wang Yao	1
Li Jie	0

Semi-finals
11 March
Shi Yue	0
Gu Lingyi	1
11 March
Dang Yifei	1
Wang Yao	0

Final
11 March
Gu Lingyi	1
Dang Yifei	0
