= 1st Zhaoshang Cup =

2011 Go competition

The '1st Zhaoshang Cup' began on 5 March 2011 and concluded on 6 March. Team China defeated Team Korea 6–4.

== Teams ==
Team China	(South Korea) Team Korea
Kong Jie	Choi Cheol-han
Gu Li	Pak Yeong-hun
Xie He	Kang Dongyun
Liu Xing	Park Junghwan
Zhou Ruiyang	Heo Young-ho
Jiang Weijie (substitute)	Yun Junsang (substitute)

== First round ==
Team China	2–3	(South Korea) Team Korea
Gu Li	0–1	Heo Young-ho
Kong Jie	1–0	Pak Yeong-hun
Jiang Weijie	0–1	Park Junghwan
Xie He	1–0	Kang Dongyun
Zhou Ruiyang	0–1	Choi Cheol-han

== Second round ==
Team China	4–1	(South Korea) Team Korea
Gu Li	0–1	Choi Cheol-han
Kong Jie	1–0	Heo Young-ho
Liu Xing	1–0	Pak Yeong-hun
Xie He	1–0	Park Junghwan
Zhou Ruiyang	1–0	Yun Junsang

== Total ==
1st Zhaoshang Cup Champions
Team China (1st title)
