= Shi Yue (Go player) =

Chinese Go player

Shi Yue 时越
Personal information
- Born: January 11, 1991 (age 35) Luoyang, Henan, China

Sport
- Turned pro: 2003
- Rank: 9 dan
- Affiliation: Chinese Weiqi Association

Shi Yue
- Traditional Chinese: 時越
- Simplified Chinese: 时越
Transcriptions
Standard Mandarin
- Hanyu Pinyin: Shí Yuè

Shi Yue (Chinese: 时越; born 11 January 1991) is a Chinese professional go player.

Shi won the LG Cup in 2013, defeating Won Seong-jin 2-0 in the final.

In 2015 Shi proceeded to the Samsung Cup Final eventually losing to Ke Jie. In 2019 Shi proceeded to the LG Cup Final, but lost to Yang Dingxin.

== Promotion record ==
Rank	Year	Notes
1 dan	2003	Promoted to professional dan rank after passing qualifying test.
2 dan	2004	Promoted for performance in the Chinese professional promotion tournament.
3 dan	2006	Promoted for performance in the Chinese professional promotion tournament.
4 dan	2007	Promoted for performance in the Chinese professional promotion tournament.
5 dan	2010	Promoted for performance in the Chinese professional promotion tournament.
6 dan	2013	Skipped due to the Chinese Weiqi Association promotion rules.
7 dan	2013	Skipped due to the Chinese Weiqi Association promotion rules.
8 dan	2013	Skipped due to the Chinese Weiqi Association promotion rules.
9 dan	2013	Won the 17th LG Cup against Won Seongjin.

== Career record ==
As of 1 August 2020

- 2005: 2 wins, 1 loss
- 2006: 13 wins, 11 losses
- 2007: 22 wins, 14 losses
- 2008: 32 wins, 15 losses
- 2009: 27 wins, 23 losses
- 2010: 34 wins, 23 losses
- 2011: 33 wins, 16 losses
- 2012: 47 wins, 22 losses
- 2013: 64 wins, 23 losses
- 2014: 49 wins, 27 losses
- 2015: 43 wins, 25 losses
- 2016: 38 wins, 25 losses
- 2017: 29 wins, 19 losses
- 2018: 41 wins, 27 losses
- 2019: 26 wins, 35 losses
- 2020: 7 wins, 8 losses
- Total: 507 wins, 314 losses (61.8% winning percentage)

== Titles and runners-up ==
As of 1 August 2020

Domestic
Title	Wins	Runners-up
Xinren Wang	1 (2009)	
Dachongjiu Cup		1 (2012)
Changqi Cup	1 (2013)	
Quzhou-Lanke Cup		1 (2014)
Qiwang	1 (2014)	
Ricoh Cup		1 (2015)
Xinan Wang		1 (2015)
Total	3	4
International
Title	Wins	Runners-up
LG Cup	1 (2013)	1 (2019)
Samsung Cup		1 (2015)
Total	1	2
Career Total
Total	4	6

== Head-to-head record vs selected players ==
As of 1 January 2018

Players who have won international go titles in bold.

- (China) **Tang Weixing** 13:12
- (China) **Gu Li** 17:7
- (China) **Ke Jie** 9:12
- (China) **Jiang Weijie** 14:6
- (China) **Tan Xiao** 13:6
- (South Korea) **Park Junghwan** 9:10
- (China) Xie He 9:9
- (China) **Zhou Ruiyang** 8:8
- (China) **Tuo Jiaxi** 5:11
- (China) **Chen Yaoye** 10:5
- (China) **Mi Yuting** 5:10
- (China) Qiu Jun 10:4
- (China) **Wang Xi** 7:7
- (South Korea) **Kim Jiseok** 8:5
- (China) **Fan Tingyu** 8:5
- (China) **Choi Cheolhan** 7:6
- (China) Zhong Wenjing 7:5
- (China) Gu Lingyi 6:6
- (South Korea) **Lee Sedol** 5:7
- (China) Lian Xiao 5:5
- (China) Peng Liyao 4:6
- (China) Mao Ruilong 7:2
- (China) Wang Lei 6:3
- (China) **Chang Hao** 5:4
