= 12th Nongshim Cup =

The 12th Nongshim Cup was the twelfth edition of the continental team tournament, Nongshim Cup. The cup was won by Team Korea for the tenth time in team history.

== Teams ==
Team China	Team Japan	(South Korea) Team Korea
Kong Jie	Yuki Satoshi	Lee Chang-ho
Wang Xi	Hane Naoki	Mok Jin-seok
Xie He	Takao Shinji	Lee Sedol
Zhou Ruiyang	Iyama Yuta	Choi Cheol-han
Tuo Jiaxi	Sakai Hideyuki	Park Seunghwa

== Results ==
=== First round ===
Players	1st Round	2nd Round	3rd Round	4th Round
(South Korea) Lee Sedol	Lee Sedol	Lee Sedol	Xie He	Xie He
(China) Wang Xi	Lee Sedol	Lee Sedol	Xie He	Xie He
(Japan) Iyama Yuta		Lee Sedol	Xie He	Xie He
(China) Xie He			Xie He	Xie He
(Japan) Sakai Hideyuki				Xie He

=== Second round ===
Players	1st Round	2nd Round	3rd Round	4th Round	5th Round	6th Round
(China) Xie He	Xie He	Xie He	Mok Jin-seok	Takao Shinji	Takao Shinji	Choi Cheol-han
(South Korea) Park Seunghwa	Xie He	Xie He	Mok Jin-seok	Takao Shinji	Takao Shinji	Choi Cheol-han
(Japan) Hane Naoki		Xie He	Mok Jin-seok	Takao Shinji	Takao Shinji	Choi Cheol-han
(South Korea) Mok Jin-seok			Mok Jin-seok	Takao Shinji	Takao Shinji	Choi Cheol-han
(Japan) Takao Shinji				Takao Shinji	Takao Shinji	Choi Cheol-han
(China) Tuo Jiaxi					Takao Shinji	Choi Cheol-han
(South Korea) Choi Cheol-han						Choi Cheol-han

=== Final round ===
Players	1st Round	2nd Round	3rd Round
(South Korea) Choi Cheol-han	Choi Cheol-han	Choi Cheol-han	Choi Cheol-han
(China) Zhou Ruiyang	Choi Cheol-han	Choi Cheol-han	Choi Cheol-han
(Japan) Yuki Satoshi		Choi Cheol-han	Choi Cheol-han
(China) Kong Jie			Choi Cheol-han

12th Nongshim Cup Champions
Team Korea (10th title)

== See also ==
- Information about the preliminaries is at Igo-Kisen.
