= 8th Chunlan Cup =

The 8th Chunlan Cup was a 2011 international tournament for the board game of Go, which began on 27 March 2011 and concluded on 29/30 June. Defending champion Chang Hao was knocked out in the first round. The finalists were Xie He and Lee Sedol. Heo Yeongho and Gu Lingyi faced each other in the third-place match.

== Tournament ==
1st Round
(Japan) Yoda Norimoto	0
(South Korea) Heo Yeongho	1
(China) Chang Hao	BYE
(South Korea) Choi Cheol-han	1
(China) Hu Yaoyu	0
(China) Kong Jie	BYE
(Japan) Iyama Yuta	1
(European Union) Csaba Mérő	0
(China) Xie He	BYE
(Japan) Cho Chikun	1
(China) Kang Dongyun	0
(China) Qiu Jun	BYE
(South Korea) Lee Sedol	1
(Taiwan) Zhou Junxun	0
(China) Sun Tengyu	BYE
(Taiwan) Lin Zhihan	0
(Japan) Yuki Satoshi	1
(China) Wang Xi	BYE
(China) Chen Yaoye	0
(Japan) Yamashita Keigo	1
(China) Gu Li	BYE
(China) Gu Lingyi	1
(United States) Jiang Mingjiu	0
(South Korea) Lee Chang-ho	BYE

2nd Round
Heo Yeongho	1
Chang Hao	0
Choi Cheol-han	0
Kong Jie	1
Iyama Yuta	0
Xie He	1
Cho Chikun	1
Qiu Jun	0
Lee Sedol	1
Sun Tengyu	0
Yuki Satoshi	0
Wang Xi	1
Yamashita Keigo	0
Gu Li	1
Gu Lingyi	1
Lee Chang-ho	0

Quarter-finals
Heo Yeongho	1
Kong Jie	0
Xie He	1
Cho Chikun	0
Lee Sedol	1
Wang Xi	0
Gu Li	0
Gu Lingyi	1

Semi-finals
Heo Yeongho	0
Xie He	1
Lee Sedol	1
Gu Lingyi	0

Finals
Xie He	1
Lee Sedol	2

== Finals ==
Player	1	2	3	T
(China) Xie He		B+R		1
(South Korea) Lee Sedol	B+R		B+R	2
