= 6th Siptan =

The 6th Siptan began on 27 September 2010 and concluded on 5 April 2011. Lee Sedol defeated Kang Yootaek 2–1 in the final.

== Tournament ==
Round of 16
27 December
Park Junghwan	1
Jin Siyoung	0
31 January
Choi Cheol-han	1
Choi Kihoon	0
5 January
Kang Dongyun	0
Won Seong-jin	1
29 December
Jin Donggyu	0
Kang Yootaek	1
17 January
Kim Jiseok	0
Jen Youngkyu	1
12 January
Lee Sedol	1
Heo Young-ho	0
5 January
Pak Yeong-hun	1
An Choyoung	0
10 January
Lee Younggu	1
Lee Chang-ho	0

Quarter-finals
12 March
Park Junghwan	1
Choi Cheol-han	0
5 March
Won Seong-jin	0
Kang Yootaek	1
6 March
Jen Youngkyu	0
Lee Sedol	1
13 March
Pak Yeong-hun	0
Lee Younggu	1

Semi-finals
19 March
Park Junghwan	0
Kang Yootaek	1
20 March
Lee Sedol	1
Lee Younggu	0

Final
30 March–5 April
Kang Yootaek	1
Lee Sedol	2
