= 54th Guksu =

The 54th Guksu ran from 26 July 2010 to 14 February 2011. The defending champion was Lee Chang-ho. Choi Cheol-han won the right to challenge Chang-ho for his title. Cheol-han beat Chang-ho three to one in the finals to claim the title.

== Tournament ==
Round of 16
20 August
Mok Jin-seok	1
Ko Geuntae	0
16 August
Kang Jisung	0
Lee Sedol	1
16 August
Ryu Dongwan	0
Choi Cheol-han	1
16 August
Won Seong-jin	1
Joo Hyeongwuk	0
26 July
Yeom Junghoon	0
Hong Kipyo	1
31 August
Lee Chungyu	0
Heo Yeongho	1
13 August
Kim Jiseok	1
Yoo Jaesung	0
28 July
Park Jinsol	0
An Hyungjun	1

Quarter-finals
17 September
Mok Jin-seok	0
Lee Sedol	1
12 November
Choi Cheol-han	1
Won Seong-jin	0
17 September
Hong Kipyo	0
Heo Yeongho	1
26 October
Kim Jiseok	1
An Hyungjun	0

Semi-finals
9 December
Lee Sedol	0
Choi Cheol-han	1
24 November
Heo Yeongho	0
Kim Jiseok	0

Final
22 December–5 January
Choi Cheol-han	2
Kim Jiseok	1

== Finals ==
Player	1	2	3	4	5	T
Lee Chang-ho (Guksu)	W+R					1
Choi Cheol-han (Challenger)		W+R	B+R	W+R		3
