= 15th Chunwon =

The 15th Chunwon began on 15 June 2010 and concluded on 27 January 2011. Defending champion Park Junghwan progressed past the first round, but his title defense was halted after losing to Yun Junsang in the second round. Choi Cheol-han was the eventual winner, winning the Chunwon for the third time in his career.

== Tournament ==
Round of 16
17 August
Kim Jiseok	1
Ok Deukjin	0
6 July
Paek Hongsuk	1
Park Seunghwa	0
12 August
Kang Changbae	0
Choi Cheol-han	1
22 June
Seo Gunwoo	0
Lee Heesung	1
29 June
Yoo Changhyuk	0
Yun Junsang	1
30 August
Park Junghwan	1
An Choyoung	0
15 June
Lee Taehyun	1
Park Jieun	0
27 July
Pak Yeong-hun	0
Kang Yootaek	1

Quarter-finals
9 November
Kim Jiseok	1
Paek Hongsuk	0
16 September
Choi Cheol-han	1
Lee Heesung	0
28 October
Yun Junsang	1
Park Junghwan	0
28 September
Lee Taehyun	1
Kang Yootaek	0

Semi-finals
14 December
Kim Jiseok	0
Choi Cheol-han	1
16 November
Yun Junsang	0
Lee Taehyun	0

Final
27 December–27 January
Choi Cheol-han	3
Lee Taehyun	0

== Finals ==
Player	1	2	3	4	5	T
Choi Cheol-han	W+R	B+R	W+R			3
Lee Taehyun						0
