= 23rd Asian TV Cup =

The 23rd Asian TV Cup will begin on 10 June 2011 and will finish on June 10, 2011 The match-ups were drawn on 7 June. Kong Jie defended the title for a third straight time, second behind Takemiya Masaki's record of four straight.

== Participants ==
- China: Kong Jie (defending champion), Zhong Wenjing (winner of the 22nd CCTV Cup), Wang Lei (CCTV Cup runner-up)
- Japan: Yamada Kimio (58th NHK Cup winner), Yoda Norimoto (NHK Cup runner-up)
- (South Korea) Korea: Park Junghwan (29th KBS Cup winner), Paek Hongsuk (KBS Cup runner-up)

== Tournament ==
Quarter-finals
(China) Kong Jie	BYE
7 June
(Japan) Yamada Kimio	1
(South Korea) Park Junghwan	0
7 June
(Japan) Yoda Norimoto	0
(China) Wang Lei	1
8 June
(South Korea) Paek Hongsuk	1
(China) Zhong Wenjing	0

Semi-finals
8 June
Kong Jie	1
Yamada Kimio	0
9 June
Wang Lei	0
Paek Hongsuk	1

Final
10 June
Kong Jie	1
Paek Hongsuk	0
