= South-West Qiwang =

Chinese Go tournament

The South-West Qiwang (Chinese: 西南棋王赛; pinyin: Xīnán Qíwáng Sài), also known as the Xinan Wang, is a Go competition in China.

== Outline ==
The competition is a single-elimination tournament for 16 players. It is played with fast time controls: each player has no main time and five 40-second byoyomi periods, as of the 23nd South-West Qiwang in 2024. Formerly, in 2021 and earlier, each player had 30 seconds to play each move, as well as ten extra periods of 60 seconds.

As of 2025, the winner's prize is 250,000 RMB and the runner-up's prize is 120,000 RMB. This was increased from 2019, when the prize money was 160,000 RMB and 80,000 RMB respectively.

== Past winners and runners-up ==
Edition	Year	Winner	Runner-up
1st	2002	Yang Yi	Ding Wei
2nd	2003	Gu Li	Ding Wei
3rd	2004	Zhou Heyang	Gu Li
4th	2005	Wang Lei	Zhu Yuanhao
5th	2006	Wang Lei	Wang Xi
6th	2007	Gu Lingyi	Yang Yi
7th	2008	Gu Lingyi	Li Jie
8th	2009	Gu Lingyi	Gu Li
9th	2010	Wang Xi	Piao Wenyao
10th	2011	Gu Lingyi	Dang Yifei
11th	2012	Piao Wenyao	Peng Liyao
12th	2013	Xie He	Gu Li
13th	2014	Tang Weixing	Chang Hao
14th	2015	Tang Weixing	Shi Yue
15th	2016	Yang Dingxin	Tao Xinran
16th	2017	Yang Dingxin	Tan Xiao
17th	2018	Mi Yuting	Tang Weixing
18th	2019	Ke Jie	Dang Yifei
19th	2020	Mi Yuting	Tuo Jiaxi
20th	2021	Yang Dingxin	Mi Yuting
21st	2022	Ke Jie	Tang Weixing
22nd	2023	Fan Tingyu	Tang Weixing
23rd	2024	Fan Tingyu	Ke Jie
24th	2025	Gu Zihao	Ding Hao
25th	2026	Li Xuanhao	Tu Xiaoyu
