= Lian Xiao =

Chinese professional go player (born 1994)

Lian Xiao 连笑
Personal information
- Born: April 8, 1994 (age 32) Dandong, Liaoning, China

Sport
- Turned pro: 2007
- Teacher: Wu Zhaoyi
- Rank: 9 dan
- Affiliation: Chinese Weiqi Association

Lian Xiao
- Traditional Chinese: 連笑
- Simplified Chinese: 连笑
Transcriptions
Standard Mandarin
- Hanyu Pinyin: Lián Xiào

Lian Xiao (Chinese: 连笑; pinyin: Lián Xiào; born 8 April 1994) is a Chinese professional go player. As of January 2017, he is ranking 5th in Chinese Weiqi Association official ratings with and Elo rating of 2660. Lian was promoted to 8 dan on 16 January 2017, and 9 dan in October 2017.

== Promotion record ==
Rank	Year	Notes
1 dan	2007	Promoted to professional dan rank for performance in the Chinese professional qualification tournament.
2 dan	2008	Promoted for performance in the Chinese professional promotion tournament.
3 dan	2009	Promoted for performance in the Chinese professional promotion tournament.
4 dan	2010	Promoted for performance in the Chinese professional promotion tournament.
5 dan	2013	Skipped due to the Chinese Weiqi Association promotion rules.
6 dan	2013	Skipped due to the Chinese Weiqi Association promotion rules.
7 dan	2013	Won the 15th China-Japan Agon Cup against Murakawa Daisuke.
8 dan	2017	
9 dan	2017	Promoted for accumulation of points in the Chinese Weiqi League.

== Career record ==
As of 1 February 2019

Year	Won	Lost	Win %
2008	7	8	46.7%
2009	10	6	62.5%
2010	34	20	63.0%
2011	17	18	48.6%
2012	67	29	69.8%
2013	56	30	65.1%
2014	44	26	62.9%
2015	38	18	67.9%
2016	34	18	65.4%
2017	33	22	60.0%
2018	52	24	68.4%
2019	1	0	100%
Total	393	219	64.2%

== Titles and runners-up ==
As of 1 May 2019

Tied for #10 in total number of individual titles in China.

Domestic
Title	Wins	Runners-up
Liguang Xinxiu Cup	1 (2010)	
Ahan Tongshan Cup	1 (2013)	
Liguang Cup	1 (2014)	
Changqi Cup	1 (2015)	1 (2013, 2016)
Mingren	3 (2015-2017)	1 (2014, 2018)
Longxing		1 (2018)
Qisheng	1 (2018)	1 (2014)
Tianyuan	3 (2017–19)	
Quzhou-Lanke Cup		1 (2024)
Total	11	6
Continental
Title	Wins	Runners-up
China-Japan Agon Cup	1 (2013)	
World Meijin		1 (2018)
Total	1	1
Career Total
Total	13	6

== Head-to-head record vs selected players ==
As of 1 February 2019

Players who have won international Go titles in bold.

- (China) **Mi Yuting** 13:9
- (China) **Zhou Ruiyang** 12:8
- (China) **Chen Yaoye** 10:8
- (China) **Fan Tingyu** 7:8
- (China) **Ke Jie** 4:7
- (China) **Tuo Jiaxi** 4:7
- (China) Yang Dingxin 8:2
- (China) Fan Yunruo 7:3
- (China) Cai Jing 6:4
- (China) **Shi Yue** 5:5
- (China) **Li Qincheng** 7:2
- (China) Liu Xing 6:3
- (China) Peng Liyao 4:5
- (China) **Tang Weixing** 3:6
- (China) **Gu Li** 6:2
- (China) Tao Xinran 4:4
- (South Korea) **Kim Jiseok** 6:1
- (China) **Tong Mengcheng** 5:2
- (China) Liao Xingwen 5:2
- (China) Huang Yunsong 4:3
- (China) Meng Tailing 4:3
- (China) Zhou Hexi 4:3
- (China) Gu Lingyi 2:5
- (China) Niu Yutian 5:1
