= 2010 Korean Baduk League =

The 2010 Korean Baduk League began on 6 May 2010 and concluded on 23 January 2011. Shinan Chunil Salt defeated Hangame in the final, winning their first league title.

== Teams ==
Chungbuk and Konkuk Milk

1. Heo Young-ho
2. Yun Junsang
3. Han Wonggyu
4. Cho Hunhyun
5. Kim Jinwoo
6. Kim Junghyun

Hangame

1. Kang Dongyun
2. Lee Younggu
3. An Hyungjun
4. Kim Juho
5. Yoo Jaeho
6. Jin Siyoung

Hite Jinro

1. Choi Cheol-han
2. Won Seong-jin
3. Kim Hyeongwoo
4. An Sungjoon
5. Han Jongjin
6. Lee Wonyoung

Kixx

1. Park Junghwan
2. Hong Sungji
3. Lee Wondo
4. Ko Geuntae
5. Lee Jaewong
6. Lee Taehyun

Netmarble

1. Lee Chang-ho
2. Kim Seongjae
3. Song Tae Kon
4. Seo Gunwoo
5. Choi Kihoon
6. Park Jieun

Posco Chemtech

1. Pak Yeong-hun
2. Paek Hongsuk
3. Lee Heesung
4. Yun Chanhee
5. Kang Changbae
6. On Sojin

Shinan Chunil Salt

1. Lee Sedol
2. Han Sanghoon
3. Lee Chungyu
4. Lee Hobum
5. Park Siyeol
6. An Kukhyun

Tbroad

1. Mok Jin-seok
2. An Choyoung
3. Hong Minpyo
4. Park Seunghwa
5. Choi Myung-Hoon
6. Kim Kiyoung

Yeongnam Ilbo

1. Kim Jiseok
2. Park Jungsang
3. Kang Yootaek
4. Yoo Changhyuk
5. Baek Daehyun
6. Park Seunghyun

== Final standings ==
Pos	Team	W	L	Pts
1	Hangame	12	4	47
2	Chungbuk and Konkuk Milk	11	5	43
3	Shinan Chunil Salt	10	6	46
4	Hite Jinro	9	7	44
5	Kixx	9	7	43
6	Tbroad	7	9	37
7	Posco Chemtech	5	11	35
8	Netmarble	5	11	31
9	Yeongnam Ilbo	4	12	34

== Play-offs ==
Players	1st Round	2nd Round	Final
Hite Jinro	Shinan Chunil Salt	Shinan Chunil Salt	Shinan Chunil Salt
Shinan Chunil Salt	Shinan Chunil Salt	Shinan Chunil Salt	Shinan Chunil Salt
Chungbuk and Konkuk Milk		Shinan Chunil Salt	Shinan Chunil Salt
Hangame			Shinan Chunil Salt
