= 29th KBS Cup =

South Korean Go competition

The 29th KBS Cup began on 12 March 2010 and concluded on 21 March 2011. Park Junghwan defeated Paek Hongsuk 2–0 in the final.

== Tournament ==
First round
Kim Juho	1
An Hyungjin	0
Joo Hyeongwuk	1
Jin Siyoung	0
Kang Jisung	0
Park Junghwan	1
Pak Yeong-hun	1
Ko Geuntae	0
Cho Hunhyun	0
Kim Junghyun	1
Lee Sanghoon	0
Choi Cheol-han	1
Lee Heesung	1
Yun Junsang	0
Kim Hyungwan	0
Paek Hongsuk	1
Kang Yootaek	1
Rui Naiwei	0
Kim Dong-hee	0
Kim Jiseok	1
Park Jungsang	1
An Choyoung	0
Lee Sedol	1
Kim Hyeongwoo	0
Park Junsang	0
Kim Sooyoung	1
Joo Hyeongwuk	1
Lee Heesung	0
Kang Yootaek	0
Lee Sedol	1
Kang Dongyun	0
Lee Chang-ho	1

Second round
Kim Juho	0
Lee Chang-ho	1
Joo Hyeongwuk	0
Park Junghwan	1
Pak Yeong-hun	0
Kim Sooyoung	1
Kim Junghyun	0
Choi Cheol-han	1
Lee Heesung	1
Kang Dongyun	0
Paek Hongsuk	1
Kang Yootaek	0
Kim Jiseok	1
Heo Jin	0
Park Jungsang	0
Lee Sedol	1
Kim Sooyoung	0
Joo Hyeongwuk	1
Lee Sedol	1
Lee Chang-ho	0

Quarter-finals
Lee Chang-ho	0
Park Junghwan	1
Kim Sooyoung	0
Choi Cheol-han	1
Lee Heesung	0
Paek Hongsuk	1
Kim Jiseok	1
Lee Sedol	0
Joo Hyeongwuk	0
Choi Cheol-han	1
Lee Sedol	1
Kim Jiseok	0

Semi-finals
Park Junghwan	1
Choi Cheol-han	0
Paek Hongsuk	1
Kim Jiseok	0
Choi Cheol-han	0
Lee Sedol	1

Winners/Losers final
Park Junghwan	1
Paek Hongsuk	0
Lee Sedol	0
Paek Hongsuk	1

Finals
Park Junghwan	2
Paek Hongsuk	0

- Note: the top 32 players are the winners section, while the bottom is the losers section.
