= Zhou Ruiyang =

Chinese Go player

Zhou Ruiyang 周睿羊
Personal information
- Native name: 周睿羊 (Chinese)
- Born: March 8, 1991 (age 35) Xi'an, Shaanxi, China

Sport
- Rank: 9 dan
- Affiliation: Chinese Weiqi Association

Zhou Ruiyang
Medal record

Representing China

Asian Games
Silver medal – second place	2010 Guangzhou	Men's Team

Zhou Ruiyang
- Traditional Chinese: 周叡羊
- Simplified Chinese: 周睿羊
Transcriptions
Standard Mandarin
- Hanyu Pinyin: Zhōu Ruìyáng

Zhou Ruiyang (Chinese: 周睿羊; pinyin: Zhōu Ruìyáng; born March 8, 1991) is a Chinese professional Go player.

== Biography ==
Zhou began playing Go at the age of 7. He won the biggest amateur tournament in China, the Wanbao Cup, in the same year before he became a professional. In 2005, he was promoted to 3p. Earlier that year, he won the U-15 section of the oldest international competition, the Fujitsu Cup. Zhou made history in 2006, beating Kong Jie in the challenger final for the Tianyuan, the second biggest title in China (after Mingren). At the age of 15 years, he became the youngest challenger for the title. The final of the Tianyuan was a best-of-3 against title holder Gu Li. Zhou won the first game, but lost the remaining two. Recently, he has been promoted to 5 dan. Zhou became the youngest titleholder in China in 2007 at 16 years and 0 days old. In 2010, Zhou reached the final of the Chang-ki Cup, and against his opponent Tuo Jiaxi, his record stands at five wins and six losses. They are currently in the deciding game in the 3-game match, and the winner receives 400,000 Yuan.

== Promotion record ==
Rank	Year	Notes
1 dan	2002	Promoted to professional dan rank for performance in the Chinese professional qualification tournament.
2 dan	2004	Promoted for performance in the Chinese professional promotion tournament.
3 dan	2005	Promoted for performance in the Chinese professional promotion tournament.
4 dan	2006	Promoted for performance in the Chinese professional promotion tournament.
5 dan	2007	Promoted for performance in the Chinese professional promotion tournament.
6 dan	2013	Skipped due to the Chinese Weiqi Association promotion rules.
7 dan	2013	Skipped due to the Chinese Weiqi Association promotion rules.
8 dan	2013	Skipped due to the Chinese Weiqi Association promotion rules.
9 dan	2013	Won the 1st Bailing Cup against Chen Yaoye.

== Titles and runners-up ==
As of 10 June 2018

Domestic
Title	Wins	Runners-up
Fujitsu U15 Cup	2 (2005-2006)	
Tianyuan		1 (2006)
NEC Cup		1 (2007)
Xinren Wang	2 (2007-2008)	
Weifu Fangkai Cup	1 (2008)	1 (2013)
Changqi Cup		1 (2010)
Ahan Tongshan Cup		1 (2012)
Liguang Cup	1 (2013)	
Qisheng	2 (2013-2014)	
Mingren		2 (2006, 2016)
Total	8	7
International
Title	Wins	Runners-up
Bailing Cup	1 (2013)	
Chunlan Cup		1 (2014)
LG Cup		2 (2013, 2016)
Total	1	3
Career Total
Total	9	10

== Head-to-head record vs selected players ==
As of 10 June 2018

Players who have won international Go titles in bold.

- (China) **Tuo Jiaxi** 20:14
- (China) **Gu Li** 24:9
- (China) Niu Yutian 18:6
- (China) **Kong Jie** 11:12
- (China) **Chen Yaoye** 16:4
- (China) Li Zhe 10:8
- (China) Qiu Jun 6:11
- (China) Lian Xiao 7:9
- (China) **Mi Yuting** 6:10
- (China) **Shi Yue** 8:7
- (China) Xie He 8:7
- (South Korea) **Park Junghwan** 4:11
- (China) **Chang Hao** 10:4
- (China) **Piao Wenyao** 8:6
- (China) **Tan Xiao** 7:7
- (China) Hu Yaoyu 7:6
- (China) Peng Liyao 7:6
- (China) Liu Xing 6:7
- (China) Peng Quan 9:3
- (China) Wang Haoyang 9:3
- (China) Wu Guangya 9:3
- (China) **Wang Xi** 5:7
- (China) Gu Lingyi 11:0
- (South Korea) **Choi Cheolhan** 3:8
