= Liguang Cup =

The Liguang Cup (Chinese: 理光杯; pinyin: Lǐguāng Bēi), or Ricoh Cup, was a Chinese Go competition. It was held 15 times from 2000 to 2015.

== Outline ==
This tournament was sponsored by "Ricoh Hong Kong Limited". The first year featured eight invited participants. The next year it was increased to 16 and then 54 in the third term. The 2011 game featured 48 players. The prize money was 80,000 ($12,300).

== Past winners and runners-up ==
Year	Winner	Runner-up
2001	Chang Hao	Zhou Heyang
2002	Gu Li	Kong Jie
2003	Kong Jie	Liu Xing
2004	Chang Hao	Liu Xing
2005	Xie He	Wang Xi
2006	Wang Xi	Chang Hao
2007	Hu Yaoyu	Chang Hao
2008	Qiu Jun	Gu Li
2009	Wang Yao	Zhou Heyang
2010	Kong Jie	Xie He
2011	Tan Xiao	Li Zhe
2012	Yang Dingxin	Piao Wenyao
2013	Zhou Ruiyang	Tang Weixing
2014	Lian Xiao	Wu Guangya
2015	Ke Jie	Shi Yue
