= 7th Prices Information Cup =

7th edition of the Pro-Go Tournament Prices Information Cup held in South Korea

The 7th Prices Information Cup began on 28 March 2011 and ended 28 September 2011.

== Qualified players ==
Block A

- Lee Younggu 2–0
- Choi Cheol-han 2–1

Block B

- Lee Sedol 2–0
- Kim Seongjae 2–1

Block C

- Yun Junsang 2–0
- Mok Jin-seok 2–1

Block D

- Hong Sungji 2–0
- An Choyoung 2–1

== Tournament ==
As of 1 July 2011.

Quarter-finals
6 July
Hong Sungji	0
Lee Younggu	1
13 July
Choi Cheol-han	1
Mok Jin-seok	0
6 July
Lee Sedol	0
Yun Junsang	1
13 July
An Choyoung	0
Kim Seongjae	1

Semi-finals
20 July
Lee Younggu	1
Choi Cheol-han	0
20 July
Yun Junsang	1
Kim Seongjae	0

Final
7,14,25 September
Lee Younggu	2
Yun Junsang	1
