= Chunwon =

Go competition in Korea

The Chunwon (Korean: 천원전, Hanja: 天元戰) was a Go competition in Korea. Begun in 1996, it was held nineteen times and was discontinued after 2015.

The winner of the Chunwon went on to play the winner of the Chinese equivalent (the Tianyuan), in the annual China–Korea Tengen competition.

== Outline ==
The Chunwon Cup was the equivalent to the Tengen in Japan. This tournament replaced the Baccus Cup. The sponsors were Far East Pharmaceuticals and Daily Economic Newspaper. The komi was 6.5 points. The time limits were 5 hours in the final, 4 in the main knockout, and 3 in the preliminaries. The winner's purse was 20,000,000 ($17,000).

== Past winners and runners-up ==
| Year | Winner | Score | Runner-up |
|---|---|---|---|
| 1996 | Yoo Changhyuk | 3–2 | Cho Hunhyun |
| 1997 | Lee Changho | 3–0 | Choi Myunghoon |
| 1998 | Lee Changho | 3–1 | Choi Myunghoon |
| 1999 | Lee Changho | 3–0 | Seo Bongsoo |
| 2000 | Lee Sedol | 3–0 | Yoo Jaehung |
| 2001 | Park Yeonghun | 3–1 | Yoon Seounghyun |
| 2002 | Song Taekon | 3–2 | Cho Hunhyun |
| 2003 | Choi Cheolhan | 3–1 | Won Seongjin |
| 2004 | Choi Cheolhan | 3–0 | An Dalhun |
| 2005 | Ko Geuntae | 3–2 | Park Yeonghun |
| 2006 | Cho Hanseung | 3–1 | Lee Sedol |
| 2007 | Won Seungjin | 1–0 | Kang Dongyun |
| 2008 | Kang Dongyun | 3–2 | Lee Sedol |
| 2009 | Park Junghwan | 3–0 | Kim Jiseok |
| 2010 | Choi Cheolhan | 3–0 | Lee Taehyun |
| 2011 | Choi Cheolhan | 2–1 | Yun Junsang |
| 2012 | Park Yeonghun | 2–0 | Choi Cheolhan |
| 2013 | Park Junghwan | 2–0 | Choi Cheolhan |
| 2014 | Na Hyun | 2–0 | Shin Minjun |

== See also ==
- Tianyuan (Go)
- Tengen (Go)
