= 2011 Korean Baduk League =

The 2011 Korean Baduk League began on 12 May 2011.

== Teams ==
Hangame

1. Lee Younggu
2. Yun Junsang
3. Jin Siyoung
4. Han Taehee
5. Ryu Jaehyeong
6. Lee Taehyun

Hite Jinro

1. Choi Cheol-han
2. An Kukhyun
3. Lee Chungyu
4. Kim Kiwon
5. Lee Wonyoung
6. An Sungjoon

Kixx

1. Park Junghwan
2. Cho Hanseung
3. Kim Kiyoung
4. Hong Sungji
5. Kim Daeyoung
6. Park Seunghwa

Netmarble

1. Lee Chang-ho
2. Won Seong-jin
3. Han Wonggyu
4. An Hyungjun
5. Lee Sanghoon
6. Kim Hyeongwoo

Posco LED

1. Kang Dongyun
2. Mok Jin-seok
3. Paek Hongsuk
4. On Sojin
5. Joo Hyeongwuk
6. Kim Hyungjun

Shinan Chunil Salt

1. Lee Sedol
2. An Choyoung
3. Han Sanghoon
4. Kang Seungmin
5. Lee Jungwoo
6. Kim Dongho

Tbroad

1. Heo Young-ho
2. Pak Yeong-hun
3. Kim Seongjae
4. Jin Donggyu
5. Lee Yongchan
6. Ko Geuntae

Yeongnam Ilbo

1. Kim Jiseok
2. Kang Yootaek
3. Park Jungsang
4. Lee Jihyun
5. Park Jinsol
6. Na Hyun

== Standings ==
Pos	Team	W	L	Pts
1	Posco LED	2	1	9
2	Yeongnam Ilbo	2	1	9
3	Hangame	2	1	7
4	Tbroad	1	1	6
5	Hite Jinro	1	1	5
6	Netmarble	1	1	5
7	Shinan Chunil Salt	1	2	5
8	Kixx	0	2	4

Player	HAN	HIT	KIX	NET	POS	SCS	TBR	YEO
Hangame	–							
Hite Jinro		–			2–3			
Kixx	2–3		–					
Netmarble				–			1–4	
Posco LED					–			
Shinan Chunil Salt		2–3				–		3–2
Tbroad							–	
Yeongnam Ilbo								–

== Results ==
12 May, 13 May	Shinan Chunil Salt	3–2	Yeongnam Ilbo
	Han Sanghoon (+R); Kang Seungmin; Kim Dongho (+R); An Choyoung; Lee Sedol (C) (+R)		Park Jungsang; Kang Yootaek (+R); Na Hyun; Kim Jiseok (C) (+R); Lee Jihyun

15 May, 18 May	Hite Jinro	2–3	Posco LED
	An Sungjoon; An Kukhyun (+4.5); Lee Chungyu; Choi Cheol-han (C); Lee Wonyoung (+R)		Kim Junghyun (+1.5); On Sojin; Kang Dongyun (C) (+4.5); Paek Hongsuk (+1.5); Mok Jin-seok

15 May, 18 May	Kixx	2–3	Hangame
	Park Junghwan (C); Hong Sungji; Kim Kiyoung; Park Seunghwa (+R); Cho Hanseung (+R)		Yun Junsang (+1.5); Lee Younggu (C) (+R); Jin Siyoung (+R); Han Taehee; Lee Taehyun

21 May, 22 May	Netmarble	1–4	TBroad
	Lee Chang-ho (C) (+R); Kim Hyeongwoo; An Dalhun; Han Wonggyu; Won Seong-jin		Pak Yeong-hun; Kim Seongjae (+R); Heo Young-ho (C) (+R); Ko Geuntae (+1.5); Jin Donggyu (+R)

26 May, 27 May	Shinan Chunil Salt	2–3	Hite Jinro
	Lee Sedol (C); Kim Dongho (+R); An Choyoung; Lee Jungwoo (+R); Han Sanghoon		Choi Cheol-han (C) (+R); Lee Wonyoung; Kim Kiwon (+R); Lee Chungyu; An Kukhyun (+R)
