= Mingren =

The Mingren (Chinese: 中国围棋名人战; pinyin: Zhōngguó Wéiqí Míngrén Zhàn) is a Go competition in China organized by the Chinese Weiqi Association. The word míngrén means "brilliant man". The Mingren is equivalent to the Nihon-Kiin's Meijin and the Hanguk Kiwon's Myungin titles.

== Outline ==
The Mingren is sponsored by the Zhongguo Qiyuan and the People's Daily. It consists of a preliminary tournament in which 32 players compete against one another to determine the challenger to the previous year's winner. The preliminary is a single-elimination format, and the title match is decided in a best-of-three. Prior to 2016, the final of the preliminary tournament was decided in a best-of-three, and the title match was decided in a best-of-five.

The winner's purse is ¥400,000 and the runner-up's is ¥200,000, as of 2025. This was increased in 2023 from the previous edition (2019), where the prize money was ¥300,000 and ¥100,000.

== Past Winners and runners-up ==
No.	Year	Winner	Score	Runner-up
1	1988	Liu Xiaoguang	3–1	Yu Bin
2	1989	Ma Xiaochun	3–0	Liu Xiaoguang
3	1990	Ma Xiaochun	3–2	Yu Bin
4	1991	Ma Xiaochun	3–2	Nie Weiping
5	1992	Ma Xiaochun	3–1	Zhang Wendong
6	1993	Ma Xiaochun	3–0	Cao Dayuan
7	1994	Ma Xiaochun	3–2	Luo Xihe
8	1995	Ma Xiaochun	3–0	Liu Xiaoguang
9	1996	Ma Xiaochun	3–2	Liu Xiaoguang
10	1997	Ma Xiaochun	3–1	Luo Xihe
11	1998	Ma Xiaochun	3–2	Liu Xiaoguang
12	1999	Ma Xiaochun	3–0	Chang Hao
13	2000	Ma Xiaochun	3–2	Shao Weigang
14	2001	Ma Xiaochun	3–2	Chang Hao
15	2002	Zhou Heyang	3–1	Ma Xiaochun
16	2003	Qiu Jun	3–2	Zhou Heyang
17	2004	Gu Li	3–0	Qiu Jun
18	2005	Gu Li	3–0	Yu Bin
19	2006	Gu Li	3–0	Zhou Ruiyang
20	2007	Gu Li	3–0	Ding Wei
21	2008	Gu Li	3–2	Piao Wenyao
22	2009	Gu Li	3–1	Gu Lingyi
23	2010	Jiang Weijie	3–2	Gu Li
24	2011	Jiang Weijie	3–2	Kong Jie
25	2012	Tan Xiao	3–0	Jiang Weijie
26	2013	Chen Yaoye	3–1	Tan Xiao
27	2014	Chen Yaoye	3–1	Lian Xiao
28	2015	Lian Xiao	3–0	Chen Yaoye
29	2016	Lian Xiao	2–1	Zhou Ruiyang
30	2017	Lian Xiao	2–1	Mi Yuting
31	2018	Mi Yuting	2–1	Lian Xiao
32	2019	Mi Yuting	2–1	Xu Jiayang
33	2023	Mi Yuting	2–1	Ke Jie
34	2024–25	Mi Yuting	2–0	Tu Xiaoyu

== See also ==
- Meijin
- Myungin
