= Shao Weigang =

Chinese professional Go player (born 1973)

Personal information
- Native name: 邵煒剛 (Chinese)
- Full name: Shao Weigang
- Born: February 21, 1973 (age 53) Shanghai, China

Sport
- Turned pro: 1986
- Teacher: Ma Xiaochun
- Rank: 9 dan
- Affiliation: Zhongguo Qiyuan

Shao Weigang (simplified Chinese: 邵炜刚; traditional Chinese: 邵煒剛; pinyin: Shào Wěigāng, born February 21, 1973) is a Chinese professional Go player.

== Biography ==
Shao started to learn Go at the age of 8. By 1986, when he was 13, Shao turned professional. Over 12 years, he was promoted to 9 dan. He currently resides in China.

== Titles & runners-up ==
| Title | Years Held |
|---|---|
| Current | 4 |
| (China) NEC Cup | 1997, 2000 |
| (China) Xinren Wang | 1995 |
| (China) National Go Individual | 1992 |

| runners-up | Years Lost |
|---|---|
| Current | 5 |
| (China) Mingren | 2000 |
| (China) Ahan Tongshan Cup | 2000, 2004 |
| (China) National Go Individual | 1997, 2000 |
| Defunct | 1 |
| (China) Yongda Cup | 2004 |
