= NEC Cup (China) =

Chinese Go competition

The NEC Cup was a Zhongguo Qiyuan Go competition, supported by NEC Corporation. It was held 14 times in total, from 1995 to 2009.

== Outline ==
The winner's purse was 200,000 CY ($24,000).

== Past winners ==
| Player | Years Held |
|---|---|
| Cao Dayuan | 1996 |
| Shao Weigang | 1997, 2000 |
| Chang Hao | 1998, 2002, 2005 |
| Zhou Heyang | 1999 |
| Luo Xihe | 2001 |
| Wang Lei | 2003 |
| Gu Li | 2004, 2006, 2008, 2009 |
| Qiu Jun | 2007 |

== See also ==
- NEC Cup, Japanese Go competition sponsored by the same company
