= Zhaoshang Cup =

Go competition between China and South Korea

The Zhaoshang Cup is a Go competition between China and South Korea.

== Outline ==
The Zhaoshang Cup is a team competition between players from the Zhongguo Qiyuan and Hanguk Kiwon. Each team is made up of six players (five players and one substitute).

== Past winners and runners-up ==
Year	Winner	Score	Runner-up
2011	China	6–4	South Korea
2012	China	7–3	South Korea
2013	South Korea	5–5	China
2014	South Korea	7–7	China
