= Qiwang (Go) =

Chinese Go tournament

Qiwang (Chinese: 中国围棋棋王战; pinyin: Zhōngguó Wéiqí Qíwáng Zhàn) was a Go competition in China.

The tournament was discontinued in 2003.

== Past winners and runners-up ==
Year	Winner	Runner-up
1989	Qian Yuping	Yu Bin
1990	Nie Weiping	Qian Yuping
1991	Ma Xiaochun	Nie Weiping
1992	Ma Xiaochun	Liang Weitang
1993	Ma Xiaochun	Cao Dayuan
1994	Ma Xiaochun	Zhang Wendong
2000	Yu Bin	Ma Xiaochun
2001	Yu Bin	Kong Jie
