= CCTV Cup =

Chinese Go competition

The CCTV Cup(Chinese: 中国电视围棋快棋赛) is a Chinese Go competition. The competition was established in 1987 and is held annually (except that it was only held once in 2023–2024). The name 'Pinghu, Zhejiang, Danghu Shiju Cup' (Chinese: 浙江平湖·当湖十局杯) was later added to the official name, and CCTV is no longer part of the name since 2023.

== Outline ==
The CCTV Cup is the longest running fast game tournament in China and the sponsor is the Chinese CCTV station. The winner and the runner-up qualify for the Asian TV Cup, where they compete against the winners and runners-up of the Japanese NHK Cup and the South Korean KBS Cup.

Each player has 1 hour of main time with one 60-second byoyomi period. The time control was changed in 2021 to be much slower than the previous time limit, which was one move every 30 seconds.

The winner's prize is 300,000 RMB (as of 2025). Formerly, the winner's prize was 250,000 RMB in 2019, increased to 300,000 RMB in 2020, further increased to 350,000 RMB for the 2023–24 cup, and decreased to 300,000 RMB in 2025.

== Past winners and runners-up ==
Year	Winner	Runner-up
1987	Nie Weiping	Cao Dayuan
1988	Qian Yuping	Cao Dayuan
1989	Ma Xiaochun	Nie Weiping
1990	Qian Yuping	Liu Xiaoguang
1991	Ma Xiaochun	Cao Dayuan
1992	Ma Xiaochun	Nie Weiping
1993	Nie Weiping	Ma Xiaochun
1994	Ma Xiaochun	Qian Yuping
1995	Ma Xiaochun	Nie Weiping
1996	Cao Dayuan	Wang Lei
1997	Nie Weiping	Yu Bin
1998	Cao Daoyuan	Ma Xiaochun
1999	Chang Hao	Liu Jing
2000	Ding Wei	Luo Xihe
2001	Hu Yaoyu	Ma Xiaochun
2002	Ma Xiaochun	Ding Wei
2003	Zhou Heyang	Peng Quan
2004	Gu Li	Yu Bin
2005	Liu Xing	Gu Li
2006	Luo Xihe	Wang Xi
2007	Piao Wenyao	Chen Yaoye
2008	Xie He	Li Zhe
2009	Kong Jie	Zhou Heyang
2010	Chen Yaoye	Gu Lingyi
2011	Zhong Wenjing	Wang Lei
2012	Tuo Jiaxi	Lian Xiao
2013	Wang Xi	Jiang Weijie
2014	Li Qincheng	Tao Xinran
2016	Mi Yuting	Li Qincheng
2017	Zhang Tao	Li Xuanhao
2018	Fan Tingyu	Fan Yunruo
2019	Ding Hao	Xu Jiayang
2020	Gu Zihao	Lian Xiao
2021	Ke Jie	Dang Yifei
2022	Shi Yue	Xie Erhao
2023–24	Huang Mingyu	Shi Yue
2025	Huang Yunsong	Xu Jiayang
