= 12th Maxim Cup =

The 12th Maxim Cup began on 2 November 2010 and concluded on 5 April 2011. Pak Yeong-hun defeated Lee Chang-ho 2–0 in the final.

== Tournament ==
Round of 16
14 December
Pak Yeong-hun	1
Lee Sanghoon	0
21 December
Won Seong-jin	0
Kang Dongyun	1
21 December
Choi Cheol-han	1
Yang Jaeho	0
14 December
Kim Dongyeop	1
Seo Bongsoo	0
4 January
Cho Hunhyun	1
Jang Sooyoung	0
7 January
Choi Kyubyeong	0
Lee Chang-ho	1
7 January
Lee Sedol	1
Park Jungsang	0
22 December
Mok Jin-seok	1
Yoo Changhyuk	0

Quarter-finals
14 January
Pak Yeong-hun	1
Kang Dongyun	0
1 February
Choi Cheol-han	1
Kim Dongyeop	0
1 February
Cho Hunhyun	0
Lee Chang-ho	1
20 January
Lee Sedol	0
Mok Jin-seok	1

Semi-finals
21 February
Pak Yeong-hun	1
Choi Cheol-han	0
22 February
Lee Chang-ho	1
Mok Jin-seok	0

Final
21 March–7 April
Pak Yeong-hun	2
Lee Chang-ho	0
