= Tianyuan (Go) =

Chinese Go competition

The Tianyuan (Chinese: 天元; pinyin: Tiānyuán) is a Go competition in China organized by the Chinese Weiqi Association. The word tiānyuán literally means the center or origin of heaven, and is the center point on a Go board; the name is similar to the Japanese Tengen and Korean Chunwon. The competition was established in 1987 and is held annually.

Formerly, the winner went on to face Japan's Tengen winner in the China–Japan Tengen from 1988 to 2002, and Korea's Chunwon winner in the China–Korea Tengen from 1997 to 2015. Both of those competitions have been discontinued.

== Outline ==
The Tianyuan competition is organized by the Chinese Weiqi Association, Xinmin Evening News, and the government of Tongli, Jiangsu. It consists of a preliminary tournament in which 32 players compete against one another to determine the challenger to the previous year's winner. The preliminary is a single-elimination format, and the title match is decided in a best-of-three. As of 2025, the winner receives 400,000 RMB in prize money and the runner-up receives 200,000.

== Past winners and runners-up ==
Edition	Year	Winner	Score	Runner-up
1st	1987	Ma Xiaochun	2–1	Nie Weiping
2nd	1988	Liu Xiaoguang	3–2	Ma Xiaochun
3rd	1989	Liu Xiaoguang	3–2	Jiang Zhujiu
4th	1990	Liu Xiaoguang	3–2	Qian Yuping
5th	1991	Nie Weiping	3–0	Liu Xiaoguang
6th	1992	Nie Weiping	3–1	Ma Xiaochun
7th	1993	Liu Xiaoguang	3–1	Nie Weiping
8th	1994	Ma Xiaochun	3–0	Liu Xiaoguang
9th	1995	Ma Xiaochun	3–1	Nie Weiping
10th	1996	Ma Xiaochun	3–1	Liu Xiaoguang
11th	1997	Chang Hao	3–1	Ma Xiaochun
12th	1998	Chang Hao	3–2	Wang Lei
13th	1999	Chang Hao	3–1	Liu Xiaoguang
14th	2000	Chang Hao	3–1	Dong Yan
15th	2001	Chang Hao	3–0	Ding Wei
16th	2002	Huang Yizhong	2-0	Chang Hao
17th	2003	Gu Li	2–1	Huang Yizhong
18th	2004	Gu Li	2–0	Xie He
19th	2005	Gu Li	2–1	Zhou Heyang
20th	2006	Gu Li	2–1	Zhou Ruiyang
21st	2007	Gu Li	2–1	Liu Shizhen
22nd	2008	Gu Li	2–1	Zhou Heyang
23rd	2009	Chen Yaoye	2–0	Gu Li
24th	2010	Chen Yaoye	2–1	Gu Li
25th	2011	Chen Yaoye	2–0	Zhou Hexi
26th	2012	Chen Yaoye	2–0	Zhou Hexi
27th	2013	Chen Yaoye	2–0	Gu Lingyi
28th	2014	Chen Yaoye	2–1	Ke Jie
29th	2015	Chen Yaoye	2–0	Mi Yuting
30th	2016	Chen Yaoye	2–0	Tang Weixing
31st	2017	Lian Xiao	2–0	Chen Yaoye
32nd	2018	Lian Xiao	2–1	Xie Ke
33rd	2019	Lian Xiao	2–1	Fan Yunruo
34th	2020	Yang Dingxin	2–1	Lian Xiao
35th	2021	Gu Zihao	2–1	Yang Dingxin
36th	2022	Mi Yuting	2–1	Gu Zihao
37th	2023	Mi Yuting	2–0	Dang Yifei
38th	2024	Lian Xiao	2–1	Mi Yuting
39th	2025	Wang Xinghao	2–0	Lian Xiao
40th	2026	Wang Xinghao	2–1	Yang Kaiwen
