= Takeshi Aragaki =

Japanese professional Go player (1956–2022)

Personal information
- Native name: 新垣武 (Japanese); アラガキタケシ (Japanese)
- Full name: Takeshi Aragaki
- Born: June 4, 1956 Okinawa, Japan
- Died: November 28, 2022 (aged 66)

Sport
- Turned pro: 1969
- Teacher: Eio Sakata
- Rank: 9 dan
- Affiliation: Nihon Ki-in, Tokyo branch

Takeshi Aragaki (新垣 武, Aragaki Takeshi; June 4, 1956 – November 28, 2022) was a Japanese professional Go player.

== Promotion record ==
Rank	Year	Notes
1 dan	1969	
2 dan	1971	
3 dan	1972	
4 dan	1974	
5 dan	1975	
6 dan	1980	
7 dan	1983	
8 dan	1989	
9 dan	1994	
