= Korean Baduk League =

The Korean Baduk League is a Go competition in South Korea. The league is made up of eight teams sponsored by several different companies. The tournament itself is sponsored by Baduk TV.

== Past winners and runners-up ==
Year	Winner	Runner-up
2004	Hangame	Unknown
2005	SG Shinsung E&C	Unknown
2006	GS Caltex	Unknown
2007	Yeongnam Ilbo	SG Shinsung E&C
2008	Yeongnam Ilbo	SG Shinsung E&C
2009	Yeongnam Ilbo	Hangame
2010	Shinan Sea Salt	Hangame
2011	POSCO LED	
2012	Hangame	
2013	Shinan Sea Salt	
2014	t-broad	
2015	t-broad	
2016	t-broad	
2017	Korea Price Information	
2018	POSCO Chemtech	
2019-20	Korea Price Information	
2020-21	Celltrion	
2021-22	Hapcheon	
