= Bosai Cup =

2011 Invitational Go competition

The Bosai Cup (Chinese: 博赛杯) was a 2011 invitational Go competition consisting of one player each from China, Japan, and South Korea.

== Outline ==
The tournament consists of three players. One of the three players is given a bye. The remaining two players play a match, with the winner progressing to the final. The loser of the first match plays the player with the bye, with the winner of this match progressing to the final. The winner of the first match then plays the winner of the second match to decide the winner of the title.

== Participants ==
The top players from China, Japan, and South Korea were invited to Chongqing to take part in the Bosai Cup.

- China: Gu Li, 9p and World Meijin.
- Japan: Iyama Yuta, 9p, Meijin and Judan.
- South Korea: Lee Sedol, 9p, BC Card Cup, Siptan, and Prices Information Cup.

== Results ==
Players taking black are listed first.

- Game 1: Iyama Yuta v. Lee Sedol - B+R
- Game 2: Gu Li v. Lee Sedol - B+R
- Game 3: Gu Li v. Iyama Yuta - W+R

| Winner | Runner-up | Third place |
|---|---|---|
| Iyama Yuta | Gu Li | Lee Sedol |

=== Game 1 ===
China representative Gu Li drew a bye in the first round, setting up a first round matchup between Japan's Iyama Yuta and South Korea's Lee Sedol. Yuta, taking black, defeated Sedol by resignation.

=== Game 2 ===
Yuta's defeat of Sedol matched-up the BC Card Cup champion with Gu Li, who received a bye in the first-round. Sedol, taking white for the second match in a row, lost again by resignation.

=== Final ===
Yuta faced Li in the final, winning by resignation in 208 moves. An Younggil, 8p from South Korea, commented on the game, saying "[Yuta] played this game wonderfully. White 112 was the winning move. [Yuta]’s endgame was perfect, and [Li] didn’t get any chances afterwards. This game should be one of [Yuta]’s best games, I’m sure".
