= 49th Judan =

The 49th Judan began on 20 June 2010 and concluded on 29 April 2011. Challenger Iyama Yuta Meijin defeated title holder Cho U, who won the previous two tournaments.

== Tournament ==
=== Winners section ===
Round of 16
3 June
Anzai Nobuaki | 1
Shuto Shun | 0
17 June
Akiyama Jiro | 0
Cho Chikun | 1
17 June
O Rissei | 0
Ri Ishu | 1
3 June
Yamashita Keigo | 1
Sakai Hideyuki | 0
1 July
Iyama Yuta | 1
Kono Rin | 0
20 May
Yamashiro Hiroshi | 0
Hane Naoki | 1
20 May
Takao Shinji | 0
So Yokoku | 1
27 May
Ko Iso | 1
Kurahashi Masayuki | 0

Quarter-finals
12 August
Anzai Nobuaki | 1
Cho Chikun | 0
29 July
Ri Ishu | 0
Yamashita Keigo | 1
22 July
Iyama Yuta | 1
Hane Naoki | 0
22 July
So Yokoku | 0
Ko Iso | 1

Semi-finals
4 September
Anzai Nobuaki | 0
Yamashita Keigo | 1
12 August
Iyama Yuta | 1
Ko Iso | 0

Final
10 February
Iyama Yuta | 1
Takao Shinji | 0

=== Losers section ===
Round of 16
29 July
Shuto Shun | 0
Akiyama Jiro | 1
9 August
O Rissei | 0
Sakai Hideyuki | 1
5 August
Kono Rin | 1
Yamashiro Hiroshi | 0
8 July
Takao Shinji | 1
Kurahashi Masayuki
2 September
Cho Chikun | 1
Ri Ishu | 0
26 August
Hane Naoki | 1
So Yokoku | 0

Quarter-finals
16 September
Akiyama Jiro | 1
Sakai Hideyuki | 0
19 August
Kono Rin | 0
Takao Shinji | 1
14 October
Cho Chikun | 1
Hane Naoki | 0
14 October
Anzai Nobuaki | 0
Ko Iso | 1

Semi-finals
28 October
Akiyama Jiro | 0
Takao Shinji | 1
4 November
Cho Chikun | 0
Ko Iso | 1

Final
20 January
Takao Shinji | 1
Ko Iso | 0

== Finals ==
| Player | 1 | 2 | 3 | 4 | 5 | 6 | 7 | T |
|---|---|---|---|---|---|---|---|---|
| Cho U (Judan) | B+R | | B+R | | | | | 2 |
| Iyama Yuta (Meijin) | | B+R | | B+3.5 | B+R | | | 3 |
