= 55th Kansai Ki-in 1st Place =

The 55th Kansai Ki-in 1st Place began on 24 November 2010. The defending champion is Murakawa Daisuke.

== Tournament ==
As of 26 June 2011.

Round of 16
23 February
Yukawa Mitsuhisa	1
Sonoda Yuichi	0
23 February
Kiyonari Tetsuya	1
Arakaki Shun	0
6 April
Seto Taiki	1
Ishii Shunzo	0
20 April
Yokota Shigeaki	0
Yoshida Mika	1
18 May
Imamura Toshiya	1
Kurahashi Masayuki	0
23 March
Kim Byeongjun	0
Hatanaka Hoshinobu	1
2 March
Sakai Hideyuki	1
Kubo Katsuaki	0
13 April
Yata Naoki	0
Yuki Satoshi	1

Quarter-finals
1 June
Yukawa Mitsuhisa	0
Kiyonari Tetsuya	1
26 May
Seto Taiki	1
Yoshida Mika	0
15 June
Imamura Toshiya	0
Hatanaka Hoshinobu	1
Sakai Hideyuki
Yuki Satoshi

Semi-finals
Kiyonari Tetsuya
Seto Taiki
Hatanaka Hoshinobu

Final
