= Siptan =

South Korean Go competition

The Siptan (Korean: 십단전, Hanja: 十段戰) was a South Korean Go competition. Begun in 2005, it was held eight times and was discontinued after 2013.

== Outline ==
The Siptan was sponsored by Wonik Corporation and the Hanguk Kiwon. The format was hayago (blitz) with 10 minutes total and 40 seconds for byo-yomi. The final is decided in a best-of-3 match. The winner's purse was 25,000,000 Won (~US$26,000). It was the Korean equivalent of the Japanese Judan title.

== Past winners and runners-up ==
Year	Winner	Score	Runner-up
2005–2006	Lee Chang-ho	2–1	Park Yeong-hun
2006–2007	An Choyoung	2–1	Paek Hongsuk
2007–2008	Lee Chang-ho	2–0	Mok Jin-seok
2008–2009	Park Junghwan	2–0	Paek Hongsuk
2009–2010	Park Junghwan	2–1	Lee Chang-ho
2010–2011	Lee Sedol	2–1	Kang Yootaek
2011–2012	Choi Cheol-han	2–0	Kang Dong-yun
2012–2013	Kang Dong-yun	2–0	Park Yeong-hun

== See also ==
- Judan
