= 30th NEC Cup =

The 30th NEC Cup began on 3 June 2010 and concluded on 5 March 2011. Defending champion Kono Rin and Honinbo Yamashita Keigo were given first-round byes. Cho U defeated Keigo in the final, winning his third NEC Cup.

== Tournament ==
Round of 16
Kono Rin	BYE
12 July
So Yokoku	1
Cho Chikun	0
3 June
O Rissei	0
Cho U	1
19 July
Takao Shinji	0
Hane Naoki	1
21 June
Iyama Yuta	1
Yamada Kimio	0
8 July
O Meien	1
Yoda Norimoto	0
22 July
Kobayashi Satoru	0
Yuki Satoshi	1
Yamashita Keigo	BYE

Quarter-finals
6 September
Kono Rin	1
So Yokoku	0
12 August
Cho U	1
Hane Naoki	0
19 August
Iyama Yuta	0
O Meien	1
2 September
Yuki Satoshi	0
Yamashita Keigo	1

Semi-finals
5 February
Kono Rin	0
Cho U	1
5 February
O Meien	0
Yamashita Keigo	1

Final
5 March
Cho U	1
Yamashita Keigo	0
