= Li Haojie =

Chinese footballer

Li Haojie 리호걸 李浩杰
Personal information
- Date of birth: 3 July 1993 (age 33)
- Place of birth: Yanji, Jilin, China
- Height: 1.78 m (5 ft 10 in)
- Positions: Midfielder; defender

Senior career*
| Years | Team | Apps | (Gls) |
| 2012–2018 | Yanbian Funde | 87 | (0) |
| 2019 | Yanbian Beiguo | 26 | (0) |
| 2020–2023 | Sichuan Jiuniu | 52 | (0) |
| 2024 | Yanbian Longding | 17 | (0) |
| Total | | 182 | (0) |
- * Club domestic league appearances and goals as of 8 September 2024

Li Haojie
- Simplified Chinese: 李浩杰
Transcriptions
Standard Mandarin
- Hanyu Pinyin: Lǐ hàojié
- IPA: [lì xâʊ tɕjě]

Chinese Korean name
- Chosŏn'gŭl: 리호걸
Transcriptions
- Revised Romanization: Ri Hogeol
- McCune–Reischauer: Ri Hogŏl

Li Haojie (Chinese: 李浩杰; Korean: 리호걸; born 3 July 1993) is a Chinese footballer who currently plays for China League One side Yanbian Longding.

On 10 September 2024, Chinese Football Association announced that Li was banned from football-related activities for lifetime for involving in match-fixing.

== Club career ==
Li Haojie started his professional football career in 2012 when he was promoted to China League One side Yanbian FC's first squad. On 26 June 2012, he made his senior debut in a 2012 Chinese FA Cup match which Yanbian lost to Dalian Shide 8–0. He committed a foul to concede a penalty in the match. On 20 April 2013, Li made his league debut in a 0–0 draw against Shenyang Shenbei. He played 19 league matches in the 2015 season as Yanbian won promotion to the Chinese Super League. On 2 April 2016, Li made his Super League debut in a 1–0 home victory against Beijing Guoan.

On 1 March 2019, Li transferred to China League Two side Yanbian Beiguo. On February 4, 2020, Yanbian Beiguo was disqualified for the 2020 China League Two due to its failure to hand in the salary and bonus confirmation form before the deadline. On 29 May he joined second tier football club Sichuan Jiuniu for the 2020 China League One season. He would make his debut in a league game on 13 September 2020 against Kunshan F.C. in a game that ended in a 2-0 defeat.

== Career statistics ==
Statistics accurate as of match played 8 September 2024.

| Club | Season | League | | | National Cup | | Continental | | Other | | Total | |
| Club | Season | Division | Apps | Goals | Apps | Goals | Apps | Goals | Apps | Goals | Apps | Goals |
|---|---|---|---|---|---|---|---|---|---|---|---|---|
| Yanbian Funde | 2012 | China League One | 0 | 0 | 1 | 0 | - | | - | | 1 | 0 |
| Yanbian Funde | 2013 | China League One | 4 | 0 | 0 | 0 | - | | - | | 4 | 0 |
| Yanbian Funde | 2014 | China League One | 10 | 0 | 1 | 0 | - | | - | | 11 | 0 |
| Yanbian Funde | 2015 | China League One | 19 | 0 | 2 | 0 | - | | - | | 21 | 0 |
| Yanbian Funde | 2016 | Chinese Super League | 23 | 0 | 0 | 0 | - | | - | | 23 | 0 |
| Yanbian Funde | 2017 | Chinese Super League | 16 | 0 | 0 | 0 | - | | - | | 16 | 0 |
| Yanbian Funde | 2018 | China League One | 15 | 0 | 1 | 0 | - | | - | | 16 | 0 |
| Yanbian Funde | Total | | 87 | 0 | 5 | 0 | 0 | 0 | 0 | 0 | 92 | 0 |
| Yanbian Beiguo | 2019 | China League Two | 26 | 0 | 1 | 0 | - | | - | | 27 | 0 |
| Sichuan Jiuniu | 2020 | China League One | 12 | 0 | - | | - | | - | | 12 | 0 |
| Sichuan Jiuniu | 2021 | China League One | 20 | 0 | 1 | 0 | - | | - | | 21 | 0 |
| Sichuan Jiuniu | 2022 | China League One | 20 | 0 | 2 | 0 | - | | - | | 22 | 0 |
| Sichuan Jiuniu | Total | | 52 | 0 | 3 | 0 | 0 | 0 | 0 | 0 | 55 | 0 |
| Yanbian Longding | 2024 | China League One | 17 | 0 | 0 | 0 | - | | - | | 17 | 0 |
| Career total | | | 182 | 0 | 9 | 0 | 0 | 0 | 0 | 0 | 191 | 0 |

== Honours ==
=== Club ===
Yanbian Funde

- China League One: 2015
