= Nobuaki Anzai =

Japanese Go player

Personal information
- Native name: 安斎伸彰 (Japanese)
- Full name: Nobuaki Anzai
- Born: July 19, 1985 (age 40) Saitama, Japan

Sport
- Turned pro: 2003
- Teacher: So Kofoku
- Rank: 8 dan
- Affiliation: Nihon Ki-in

Nobuaki Anzai (安斎 伸彰, Anzai Nobuaki; born August 19, 1985 in Saitama, Japan) is a professional Go player.

== Biography ==
Anzai became a professional in 2003. He is currently 8 dan.

== Promotion record ==
Rank	Year	Notes
1 dan	2003	
2 dan	2004	
3 dan	2006	
4 dan	2007	
5 dan	2008	
6 dan	2009	
7 dan	2014	
8 dan	2022	
9 dan		
