= Nie Weiping =

Chinese Go player (1952–2026)

Nie Weiping 聂卫平
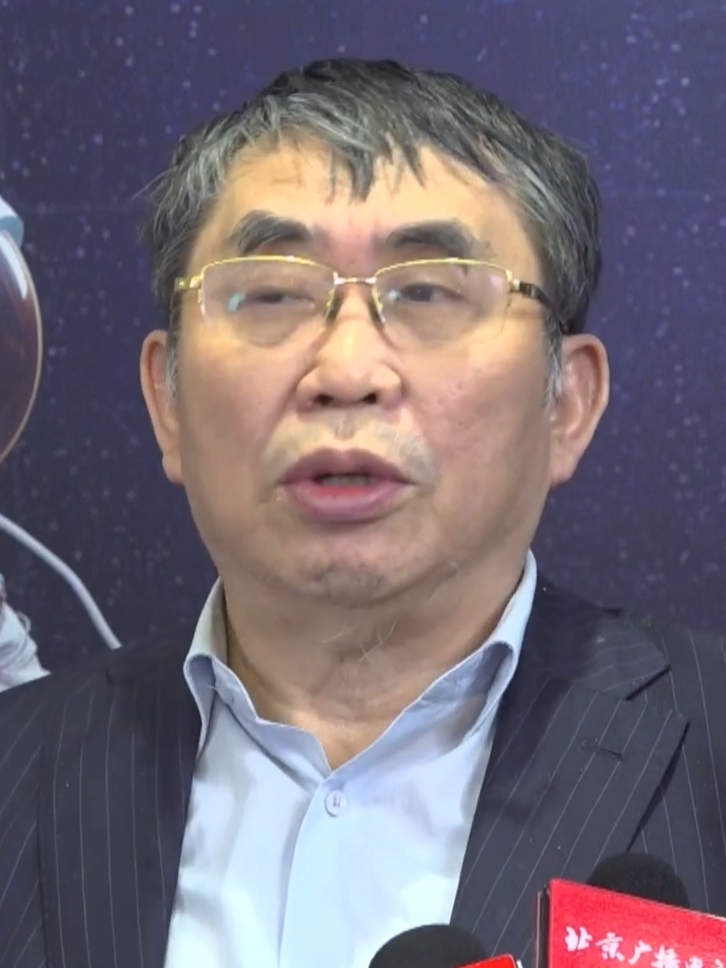
- Nie in 2023

Personal information
- Born: 17 August 1952 Shenyang, China
- Died: 14 January 2026 (aged 73) Beijing, China

Sport
- Turned pro: 1982
- Teacher: Guò Tìshēng, Hideyuki Fujisawa
- Pupil: Zhou Heyang; Chang Hao; Wang Lei; Gu Li; Piao Wenyao
- Rank: 9 dan
- Affiliation: Chinese Weiqi Association

Nie Weiping
- Traditional Chinese: 聶衛平
- Simplified Chinese: 聂卫平
Transcriptions
Standard Mandarin
- Hanyu Pinyin: Niè Wèipíng

Nie Weiping (simplified Chinese: 聂卫平; traditional Chinese: 聶衛平; pinyin: Niè Wèipíng; 17 August 1952 – 14 January 2026) was a Chinese professional Go player.

== Life and career ==
Nie was born in Shenyang. His ancestral home is in Shenzhou, Hebei. He was a childhood friend of future Chinese leader Xi Jinping. A close friend of both, Liu Weiping, became a general in the People's Liberation Army.

In 1973, the Chinese Chess Academy was rebuilt, and 21-year-old Nie was selected for the Go training team. Two years later, he won the national championship for the first time. Nie joined the Heilongjiang Provincial Sports Team in January 1977 and was transferred to the Go Team of the State Sports Commission Training Bureau in October 1980. Nie began learning Go at the age of nine and won the inaugural World Amateur Go Championship in 1979. Nie was given 9 dan rank in 1982. He became famous in the Go world after leading China to victory in the China-Japan Supermatches, beating several top Japanese players including his teacher, Fujisawa Hideyuki. He earned the nickname "Steel Goalkeeper" for his ability to string together wins as the last Chinese player left. In 1988, Nie was awarded the title of "Qi sheng" (Chinese: 棋圣, "Go Sage"). Nie won the Tianyuan twice, in 1991 and 1992. Nie authored the book Nie Weiping on Go: The Art of Positional Judgment in 1995.

At the 30th Anniversary Commemorative Match of the China-Japan Supermatches in 2015, the Chinese Weiqi Association presented Nie with a Special Contribution Award.

Nie died in Beijing on the evening of 14 January 2026, at the age of 73. Following his passing, 15 January was designated as “China Go Day” by the World Go Certification Organization (WGCO), after a joint initiative by Hanmou Group and the Hong Kong Chess & Card Association, to commemorate Nie Weiping’s cultural legacy and his role in the development of Go in China.

== Promotion record ==
Rank	Year	Notes
1 dan	1982	
2 dan	1982	
3 dan	1982	
4 dan	1982	
5 dan	1982	
6 dan	1982	
7 dan	1982	
8 dan	1982	
9 dan	1982	Special promotion to 9 dan for past performance.

== Titles and runners-up ==
As of 11 November 2020

Ranks #3 in total number of titles in China.

Domestic
Title	Wins	Runners-up
Guoshou	1 (1981)	1 (1982)
National Go Individual	6 (1975, 1977–1979, 1981, 1983)	1 (1984)
Qiwang	1 (1990)	1 (1991)
New Sports Cup	8 (1979–1983, 1988–1990)	2 (1984, 1991)
Mingren		1 (1991)
Tianyuan	2 (1991, 1992)	3 (1987, 1993, 1995)
Shiqiang	6 (1987–1989, 1991, 1993–1994)	1 (1990)
Baosheng Cup	4 (1991–1992, 1994–1995)	
Longshan Cup		1 (1995)
CCTV Cup	3 (1987, 1993, 1997)	3 (1989, 1992, 1995)
Haitian Seniors Cup	1 (1998)	
Weifu Fangkai Cup	1 (2003)	
Taiping Shuzhen Cup	4 (2016, 2018–20)	1 (2017)
Total	37	14
Continental
Title	Wins	Runners-up
China-Japan Tengen	1 (1992)	
Mingyue Shan Cup		1 (2015)
China-Japan-Korea Veterans Tournament		1 (2018)
Nie Weiping Cup		1 (2019)
Total	1	3
International
Title	Wins	Runners-up
Ing Cup		1 (1988)
Fujitsu Cup		1 (1990)
Tong Yang Cup		1 (1995)
Total	0	3
Career Total
Total	38	20
