= Liu Xing =

Chinese Go player

Personal information
- Native name: Trad. 劉星 Simp. 刘星 (Chinese); Liú Xīng (Pinyin)
- Full name: Liu Xing
- Born: December 10, 1984 (age 41) Tianjin, China

Sport
- Turned pro: 1995
- Rank: 7 dan
- Affiliation: Chinese Weiqi Association

Liu Xing
Medal record

Representing China

Asian Games
Silver medal – second place	2010 Guangzhou	Men's Team

Liu Xing (simplified Chinese: 刘星; traditional Chinese: 劉星; pinyin: Liú Xīng; born December 10, 1984) is a Chinese professional Go player.

== Biography ==
Liu started to learn Go at the age of 6. He turned professional in 1995, and joined the Chinese national squad in 1997. He was promoted to 7 dan in 2005.

== Titles & runners-up ==
Title	Years Held
Current	3
(China) CCTV Cup	2005
(China) Ahan Tongshan Cup	2006, 2007
Continental	2
China-Japan Agon Cup	2006, 2007
Total	5

Title	Years Lost
Current	4
(China) Changqi Cup	2007, 2008
(China) Liguang Cup	2003, 2004
Total	4
