= Yang Dingxin =

Chinese Go player (born 1998)

Personal information
- Native name: 杨鼎新 (Chinese)
- Born: 19 October 1998 (age 27) Zhengzhou, Henan, China

Sport
- Turned pro: 2008
- Rank: 9 dan
- Affiliation: Chinese Weiqi Association
Medal record
Men's Go
Representing China
Asian Games
Silver medal – second place	2022 Hangzhou	Men's team

Yang Dingxin (Chinese: 杨鼎新; pinyin: Yáng Dǐngxīn; born 19 October 1998) is a Chinese professional Go player.

== Biography ==
Yang Dingxin was born in 1998 in Zhengzhou, Henan. As a young child, he lived in Bingcha in Rudong County, Nantong, Jiangsu and in Zhengzhou, and moved to Beijing when he was 6. His father, an amateur Go player, introduced him to Go when he was 5 years old. He earned professional status through the qualification tournament in 2008, when he was 9 years and 9 months old, breaking the record for the youngest professional Go player.

He won the 12th Ricoh Cup in 2012 at the age of 13 years and 6 months, which broke the record for the youngest player to win a Chinese professional tournament. He also won the Weifu Fangkai Cup in 2013, and the Changqi Cup in 2014.

He was the winner of the South-West Qiwang in 2016 and again in 2017.

In 2019, he won the 23rd LG Cup, his first international championship, defeating Shi Yue 2–1 in the finals. He was promoted to 9 dan for the victory.

He won seven consecutive games for China in the 21st Nongshim Cup (2019–2020). He was finally eliminated in his eighth game by Japan's Iyama Yuta. China went on to win the tournament.

He won the Tianyuan in 2020. In 2021, he was the South-West Qiwang winner for the third time.

In a controversial incident in December 2022, Yang publicly suggested that Chinese Go player Li Xuanhao cheated using AI. Yang made the cheating allegation at the time of a Chunlan Cup semifinal game between Li Xuanhao and Shin Jinseo, which Li won. Li had also defeated Yang himself in the quarterfinals of the same tournament. The Chinese Weiqi Association ruled that there was no evidence of cheating, and penalized Yang with a six-month partial suspension from competition. As a notable exception to the suspension, Yang was still allowed to play in the LG Cup final in January–February 2023, which he lost to Ding Hao.

In September 2024, he won the 1st Jincheng National Professional Weiqi Open. In that month's rankings, he reached the number one spot in the Chinese Weiqi Association's official ranking of Chinese players.

== Titles ==
International:

- LG Cup 2019
- China-Japan Agon Cup 2024

Chinese:

- Ricoh Cup 2012
- Weifu Fangkai Cup 2013
- Changqi Cup 2014
- South-West Qiwang 2016, 2017, and 2021
- Tianyuan 2020
- Ahan Tongshan Cup 2023
- Jincheng National Professional Weiqi Open 2024

== Promotion record ==
Rank	Year	Notes
1 dan	2008	
2 dan	2010	
3 dan	2012	
4 dan		
5 dan		
6 dan	2017	
7 dan	2018	
8 dan	2019	
9 dan	2019	
