= Wang Lei (Go player) =

Chinese Go player

Personal information
- Native name: 王磊 (Chinese); Wáng Lěi (Pinyin)
- Full name: Wang Lei
- Born: December 26, 1977 (age 48) Daxinganling, Heilongjiang, China

Sport
- Turned pro: 1989
- Teacher: Nie Weiping
- Rank: 8 dan
- Affiliation: Chinese Weiqi Association

Wang Lei (Chinese: 王磊; pinyin: Wáng Lěi; born December 26, 1977, in Daxing'anling, Heilongjiang) is a Chinese professional Go player.

== Biography ==
Wang started to learn Go a little late in Eastern terms, at the age of 9. Lei became a pro in 1989 when he was just 12 years old. He has risen up the ranks and currently sits at 8 dan. He is a disciple of Nie Weiping.

== Titles and runners-up ==
Title	Years held
Current	2
(China) NEC Cup	2003
(China) Xinan Wang	2005
Total	2

Title	Years lost
Current	5
(China) Tianyuan	1998
(China) Changqi Cup	2005
(China) CCTV Cup	1996
(China) Xinren Wang	1994, 1995
Defunct	1
(China) Lebaishi Cup	1998
International	1
(South Korea) (Japan) (China) (Taiwan) Samsung Cup	2002
Total	7
