= Paek Hong-suk =

South Korean Go player

Paek Hongsuk
Personal information
- Native name: 백홍석 (Korean); 白洪淅 (Korean); Paek Hongsŏk (McCune–Reischauer)
- Full name: Paek Hongsuk
- Born: August 13, 1986 (age 39) South Korea

Sport
- Turned pro: 2001
- Rank: 9 dan
- Affiliation: Hanguk Kiwon

Paek Hongsuk (Korean: 백홍석; Hanja: 白洪淅; born 13 August 1986) is a professional Go player.

== Biography ==
Paek became a professional in August 2001. He was promoted to 5 dan in 2006. He won his first title, the SK Gas Cup, in 2006. Also in 2006, he reached the quarter-finals of the Samsung Cup before losing to Lee Chang-ho.

In 2012, Paek reached his first World Championship Final by entering the 4th BC Card Cup World Baduk Championship, having beaten many Strong Chinese players to remain as Korea's last participant. In doing so, he qualified for the 9-dan rank by reaching 2 continental finals, namely the Asian TV Cup and the BC Card Cup.

It was a poor BC Card Cup World Championship for South Korea, as they had lost the 2 Lee's, Lee Sedol and Lee Chang-ho as early as the round of 32, many other compatriots in the same round, and lost Pak Yeong-hun in the quarter-finals to eventual finalist Dang Yifei. Thus, Paek was forced to play through 3 rounds of Chinese professionals, beating Niu Yu-tian, Zhou Ruiyang and Hu Yaoyu respectively throughout the latter stages of the tournament for 3 consecutive wins en route to the final.

He will play the Final against Dang Yifei on May 12, May 13, and again for 3 consecutive days from the 15th to the 17th, after getting a 1-day rest.

After 4 days of play with 1 day of rest, Paek won his first World Championship by beating Dang Yifei 3-1, winning 3 consecutive games after falling behind 1-0. Two of the wins were with white (Games 2 and 4), one with black (Game 3).

Game 4 was labelled by him as the "Luckiest and Most poorly played" game in the Final, where he was able to win a game by half a point with white in a game where he was leading throughout. After a couple exchange of mistakes, Paek began playing very passively and allowing his opponent to gain significant territory, even showing little participation in ko fights that Dang won rather comfortably. It eventually came down to one ko fight, and whilst Dang was able to win it, he was still forced to finish the ko, thus, losing one of his own points of territory and being the unfortunate loser of a half-point match.

== Promotion record ==
Rank	Year	Notes
1 dan	2000	
2 dan	2001	
3 dan	2004	
4 dan	2005	
5 dan	2006	
6 dan	2007	
7 dan		
8 dan	2011	
9 dan	2012	

== Titles and runners-up ==
Domestic
Title	Wins	Runners-up
Siptan		2 (2006, 2008)
Kisung		1 (2008)
BC Card Cup		1 (2007)
SK Gas Cup	1 (2006)	
New Pro Strongest		1 (2007)
New Pro King		1 (2007)
Total	1	6

Continental
Title	Wins	Runners-up
Asian TV Cup		1 (2011)
BC Card Cup	1 (2012)	
Total	1	1
