= Li Zhe (Go player) =

Chinese Go player

Personal information
- Native name: 李喆 (Chinese); Lǐ Zhé (Pinyin)
- Full name: Li Zhe
- Born: January 31, 1989 (age 37) Wuhan, China

Sport
- Turned pro: 2000
- Rank: 6 dan
- Affiliation: Chinese Weiqi Association

Li Zhe (born January 31, 1989) is a Chinese professional Go player.

== Biography ==
Li was born in China. At 11 years of age, Li Zhe became one of the youngest professional Go players ever. Two years later, in 2002, Li was promoted to 3 dan. Li made more history in 2006 when he became the youngest title holder in China, at 16 years old.

== Titles & runners-up ==
Title	Years Held
Current	1
(China) Xinren Wang	2006

Title	Years Lost
Current	2
(China) CCTV Cup	2008
(China) National Go Individual	2004
