= Tan Xiao =

Chinese Go player

Personal information
- Native name: 檀啸 (Chinese)
- Born: 10 March 1993 (age 33) Changchun, Jilin, China

Sport
- Turned pro: 2004
- Rank: 9 dan
- Affiliation: Chinese Weiqi Association

Tan Xiao (Chinese: 檀啸; pinyin: Tán Xiào; born 10 March 1993) is a Chinese professional Go player.

He won the 11th RICOH Cup. In 2017, he defeated Park Yeong-hun to win the 11th Chunlan Cup, his first international individual title and was promoted to 9 dan.

== Personal life ==
Tan married Jia Ganglu, who is also a professional Go player, in November 2017.

== Promotion record ==
Rank	Year	Notes
1 dan	2004	
2 dan	2005	
3 dan	2007	
4 dan	2007	
5 dan	2009	
6 dan		
7 dan		
8 dan	2017	
9 dan	2017	For winning 11th Chunlan Cup

== Career record ==
- 2007: 35 wins, 14 losses
- 2009: 33 wins, 12 losses
- 2010: 31 wins, 21 losses
- 2011: 23 wins, 9 losses

== Titles and runners-up ==
Domestic
Title	Wins	Runners-up
Mingren	1 (2012)	
RICOH Cup	1 (2011)	
Qiwang	1 (2011)	
Total	3	0
