= Mok Jin-seok =

South Korean Go player

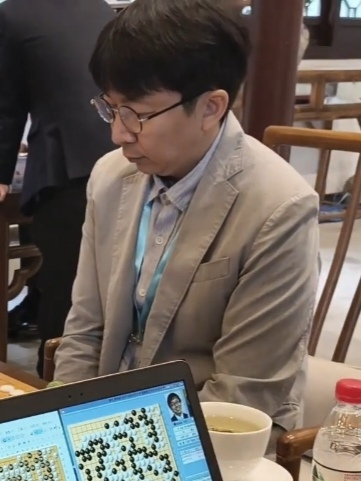
- Mok at 2024 6th Nie Weiping Cup

Personal information
- Native name: 목진석 (Korean); 睦鎭碩 (Korean)
- Full name: Mok Jin-seok
- Born: 20 January 1980 (age 46) South Korea

Sport
- Turned pro: 1994
- Teacher: choi seung-ju, Kang man-yoo
- Rank: 9 dan
- Affiliation: Hanguk Kiwon

Mok Jin-seok (born 20 January 1980) is a professional Go player.

== Biography ==
Mok Jin Seok became a professional Go player in 1994 when he was 14 and reached 9 Dan, the highest level, in 2005.

He is called 'Goe dong' by media, which means a Boy wonder. His nickname derives from his unconventional and adventurous style as well as fast reading skill in Go games.

At 15 years of age in 1995, Mok made his debut on the world stage of Go by defeating Nie Weiping at Lotte Cup held in Beijing, China.

In 2000, Mok defeated Lee Chang-ho in the final of KBS Cup: no one among professional players younger than Lee had defeated him in the finals. From 2001 to 2005, Mok participated in Chinese Go league as the first foreign player: he got 48 wins and 17 losses.

In 2001, Mok was runner-up to the Asia TV Championship. He was defeated by Cho Hun-hyeon.

His highest achievement in international competitions is the runner up at LG Cup World Championship in 2004: the winner was Lee Chang-ho.

In 2007, Mok broke a World Record for both the greatest number of wins and most matches in a year in Go—93 wins and 122 matches. He is also one of only 13 Korean players with over 1000 wins in official matches.

After Mok won his first big title in KBS Cup in 2000, it took 15 years for him to win another big title: that is, at his age of 35, Mok defeated Choi Cheol-han in the final of GS Cup in 2015.

He has managed the Korean National Go team as a head coach since 2016 and has held rookie's tournaments called 'Future's Star' for young players since 2015.

He is fluent in Chinese and proficient in English and Japanese.

== Promotion record ==
Rank	Year	Notes
1 dan	1994	
2 dan	1995	
3 dan	1997	
4 dan	1998	
5 dan	2000	
6 dan	2001	
7 dan	2003	
8 dan	2004	
9 dan	2005	

== Career record ==
- 1994: 8 wins, 2 losses
- 1995: 54 wins, 20 losses
- 1996: 64 wins, 15 losses, 1 draw
- 1997: 44 wins, 22 losses
- 1998: 59 wins, 21 losses, 1 draw
- 1999: 61 wins, 25 losses
- 2000: 62 wins, 23 losses
- 2001: 36 wins, 15 losses
- 2002: 43 wins, 28 losses
- 2003: 48 wins, 14 losses
- 2004: 24 wins, 18 losses
- 2005: 48 wins, 29 losses
- 2006: 44 wins, 21 losses
- 2007: 93 wins, 29 losses
- 2008: 59 wins, 35 losses
- 2009: 33 wins, 15 losses
- 2010: 47 wins, 25 losses
- 2011: 45 wins, 22 losses
- 2012: 41 wins, 27 losses
- 2013: 45 wins, 21 losses
- 2014: 27 wins, 26 losses
- 2015: 25 wins, 21 losses
- 2016: 25 wins, 18 losses

== Titles and runners-up ==
Domestic
Title	Wins	Runners-up
GS Cup	1 (2015)	
Olleh Cup		1 (2013)
Guksu		1 (2009)
Siptan		1 (2008)
KBS Cup	1 (2000)	
Maxim Cup		1 (2008)
Kisung		2 (1999, 2002)
BC Card Cup	1 (1998)	
King of Kings		1 (2008)
SK Gas Cup	1 (1999)	1 (1998)
Total	4	8
Continental
Asian TV Cup		1 (2001)
China-Korea New Pro Wang	1 (1998)	
Total	1	1
International
LG Cup		1 (2004)
Total	0	1
Career total
Total	5	10

=== Korean Baduk League ===
Season	Team	Place	Record
2007	Team Shinsung Construction	Runners-up	9–7
2008	Team Shinsung Construction	Runners-up	10–6
2009	Team Tbroad (Captain)	7th place	8–4
2010	Team Tbroad (Captain)	6th place	7–9
2011	Team Posco LED	Champions	10–4
