= Won Seong-jin =

South Korean Go player

Personal information
- Native name: 원성진 (Korean); 元晟溱 (Korean)
- Full name: Won Seong-jin
- Born: 15 July 1985 (age 40) South Korea

Sport
- Turned pro: 1998
- Teacher: Kweon Kab-yong
- Rank: 9 dan
- Affiliation: Hanguk Kiwon

Won Seong-jin (born 15 July 1985) is a professional Go player.

== Biography ==
Won became a professional in 1998. In 2011, Won entered his first World Championship Final, the 16th Samsung Cup, by defeating Pak Yeong-hun in the quarter-finals, and Chen Yaoye 2-1 in a hard fought semi-final to face the defending champion Gu Li, who respectively defeated former winner Lee Chang-ho, then rising Korean star Na Hyun 2-0.

The final, played from 5–7 December with no rest breaks, was the first World Championship not to include a rest day, a format which resulted in little rest for the players and more fiercely competitive games. Won, with the white stones, attacked Gu Li's long dragon in the middle of the battle and gained a convincing win, albeit from Gu Li's lack of insight on his dragon's safety.

Game 2, however produced more energetic Go from Gu, this time with the white stones, who instantaneously began forming an exterior advantage and steady territory gain in exchange for Won's opening acquired territory. The first battle scene shifted to the bottom-left hand corner, and Won immediately had to break up White's territorial/positional advantage. Whilst Black was able to successfully defend against White's attack, he conceded the initiative to White, who immediately broke into Black's territory in the bottom-right. Though Black was able to withstand white's erasure of his territory, it became clear that Black's 55th move was an error in reply, which allowed development to occur in mid-bottom territory, should White decide to do so. Black's 59th move however, was observed and quoted by many other pros as a blunder, a very sub-par move which did not benefit Black nor affect White in any way. The game progressed further, and it appeared that Black, despite his slip-ups, had White's 2 dragons (mid-bottom/right) in a tightening grip, though there was still no danger present. Only further development into the game showed that White's advantage, after breaking into Black's territory at top, was very substantial, and that Black had to securely kill the right hand group to win, or to force it into a ko fight where Black's focus would equally be on the mid-bottom dragon. Gu displayed exceptional insight to nullify Black's attacking attempts on the right, whilst it was White's excessive ko count which enabled him to win the ko fight in the huge mid/bottom ko dragon fight.

Game 3, however, was a game riddled with mistakes from both sides, though more from Gu, who again played white. It seemed like a territory endgame was to be handed to Black due to his marginal lead despite the 6.5 komi, but a mistake on move 189 gave Gu an opportunity to strike and drag the game into a closer fight. However, Gu was unable to take advantage and then handed the initiative to Won, who calmly looked for weaknesses in Gu's territory, forcing White's resignation on move 235.

This remains to date Won's only World Championship and, despite the victory, he has to perform the compulsory 2-year military service of South Korea. This is due to the Hanguk Kiwon and the Korean Military's mutual agreement that players who won major international titles outside Korea, i.e. the Fujitsu Cup and the Ing Cup, were able to be exempt from it, whilst domestic titles still required the player to perform military service.

== Promotion record ==
Rank	Year	Notes
1 dan	1998	
2 dan	1999	
3 dan	2000	
4 dan	2002	
5 dan	2003	
6 dan	2004	
7 dan	2006	
8 dan		
9 dan	2007	Special promotion from 7 dan to 9 dan for winning the 12th Chunwon.

== Career record ==
- 2006: 60 wins, 21 losses
- 2007: 61 wins, 23 losses
- 2008: 51 wins, 24 losses
- 2009: 33 wins, 28 losses
- 2010: 60 wins, 24 losses
- 2011: 18 wins, 8 losses

== Titles and runners-up ==
Domestic
Title	Wins	Runners-up
Myungin		1 (2009)
GS Caltex Cup	1 (2010)	1 (2008)
Chunwon	1 (2007)	1 (2003)
BC Card Cup	1 (2007)	2 (2001, 2006)
SK Gas Cup		1 (1999)
New Pro King	1 (2007)	2 (2001, 2006)
Total	4	8
Continental
China-Korea Tengen	1 (2008)	
Total	1	0
Career total
Total	5	8

=== Korean Baduk League ===
Season	Team	Place	Record
2007	Team Hangame (Captain)	5th place	9–4
2008	Team World Meridian (Captain)	Fourth place	11–4
2009	Team Batoo (Captain)	Third place	6–7
2010	Team Hite Jinro	Fourth place	12–5
2011	Team Netmarble	TBD	0–1
