= Tuo Jiaxi =

Chinese Go player

Personal information
- Native name: 柁嘉熹 (Chinese); Tuó Jiāxī (Pinyin)
- Born: 15 January 1991 (age 35) Daqing Heilongjiang China

Sport
- Turned pro: 2002
- Teacher: Wu Zhaoyi
- Rank: 9 dan
- Affiliation: Chinese Weiqi Association

Tuo Jiaxi (Chinese: 柁嘉熹; pinyin: Tuó Jiāxī ; born 15 January 1991) is a Chinese professional Go player.

Tuo became a professional in 2002. He was promoted to 2 dan in 2004 and reached 3 dan in 2005. He won his first professional title with the Mind Sports Games Male Fast Game in 2009. He won the Chang-ki Cup in 2010.

Tuo was a part of the Chinese team that participated in the 10th Nongshim Cup. He defeated Heo Yeongho, Yamashita Keigo, Yun Junsang, and Kono Rin before losing to Kang Dongyun. China eventually lost when their final player, Gu Li, lost to Lee Sedol.

== Promotion record ==
Rank	Year	Notes
1 dan	2002	
2 dan	2004	
3 dan	2005	
4 dan		
5 dan		
6 dan		
7 dan		
8 dan		
9 dan	2014	Promoted from 3 dan to 9 dan for winning the 18th LG Cup.

== Career record ==
- 2007: 41 wins, 25 losses
- 2008: 32 wins, 21 losses
- 2009: 38 wins, 18 losses
- 2010: 56 wins, 24 losses

== Titles and runners-up ==
Domestic
Title	Wins	Runners-up
Chang-ki Cup	2 (2010, 2016)	2 (2012, 2018)
CCTV Cup	1 (2012)	
Longxing Cup	1 (2015)	1 (2012)
Lanke Cup		1 (2012)
Xinren Wang		1 (2008)
Mind Sports Game Male Fast Game	1 (2009)	
Total	5	5
International
Title	Wins	Runners-up
LG Cup	1 (2014)	
Samsung Fire Cup		1 (2016)
Total	1	1
Career Total
Total	6	6
