= Qiu Jun (Go player) =

Chinese professional Go player (born 1982)

Personal information
- Native name: 邱峻 (Chinese); Qiū Jùn (Pinyin)
- Born: August 24, 1982 (age 43) Shanghai, China

Sport
- Turned pro: 1994
- Teacher: Yu Bin
- Rank: 9 dan
- Affiliation: Zhongguo Qiyuan

Qiu Jun (Chinese: 邱峻; pinyin: Qiū Jùn; born August 24, 1982) is a Chinese professional Go player.

== Biography ==
Jun started learning Go at the age of 6. He became a professional in 1994. Over the next 3 years, he gained 3 consecutive promotions. He was promoted to 7 dan in 2005 and then reached 8 dan in 2006. In 2009, Jun reached the Samsung Cup Final with a chance to win his first world championship. He lost the Final 0–2 to Kong Jie, and during August 2011 Jun again reached a world championship Final, this time the 23rd Fujitsu Cup Final. By Chinese Special Promotion rules, Jun was raised to the rank of 9-dan, being China's 31st 9-dan player. He subsequently lost the final to Korean rising star Park Junghwan. Jun joins a selection of players who have reached multiple World Championship Finals without victories in any.

== Titles & Runners-Up ==
As of 1 January 2019

Domestic
Title	Wins	Runners-up
National Go Individual	2 (1998, 2004)	
Xinren Wang	1 (2004)	2 (1999, 2002)
Mingren	1 (2004)	1 (2005)
NEC Cup	1 (2007)	
Liguang Cup	1 (2008)	
Changqi Cup	1 (2008)	1 (2015)
Ahan Tongshan Cup	1 (2010)	1 (2005)
Total	8	5
Continental
China-Korea New Pro Wang	1 (2004)	
China-Japan Agon Cup	1 (2010)	
Total	2	0
International
Samsung Cup		1 (2009)
Fujitsu Cup		1 (2011)
Bailing Cup		1 (2015)
Total	0	3
Career Total
Total	10	8
