= China Qiyuan =

China's official agency responsible for board and card games

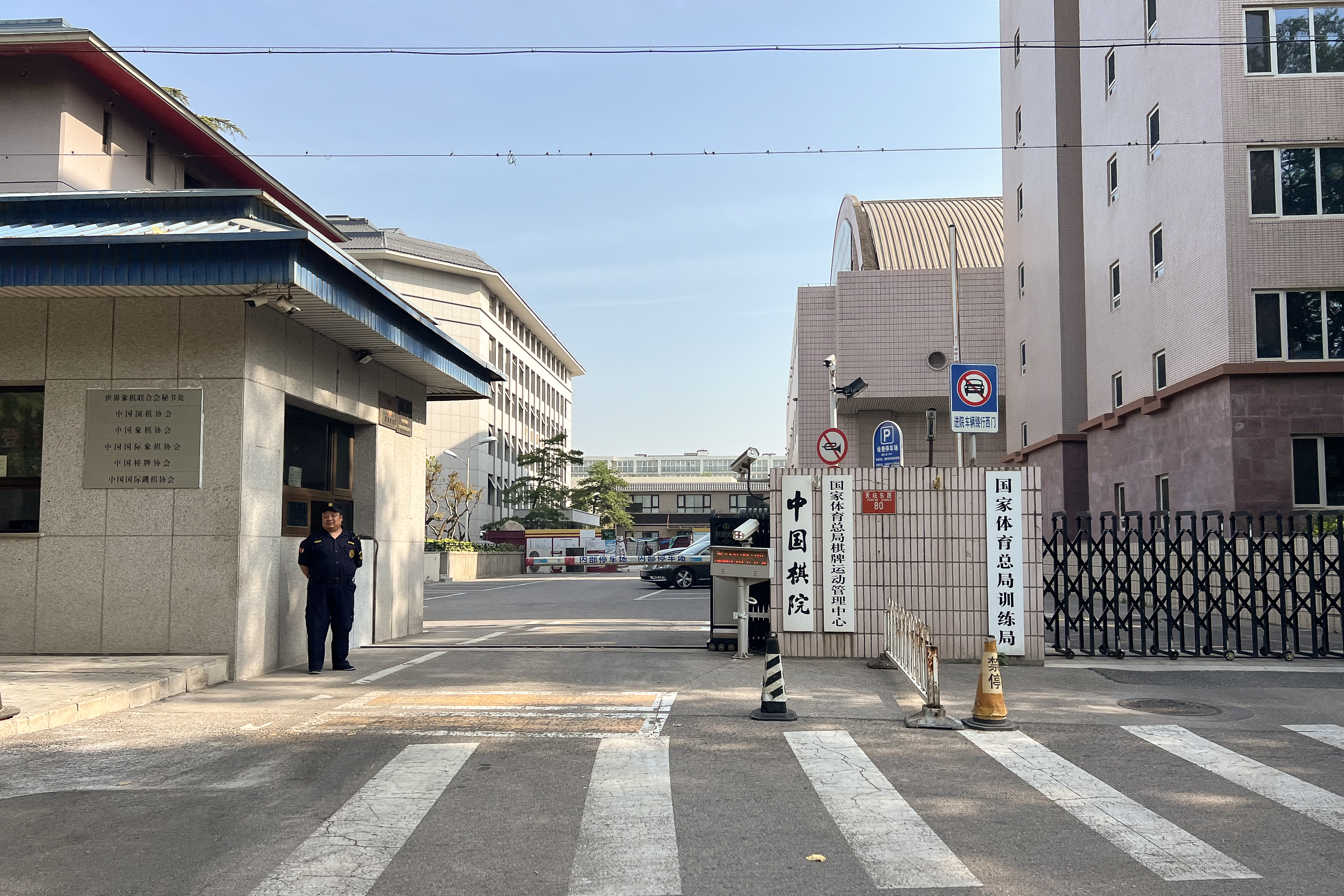
South gate of China Qiyuan

China Qiyuan (Chinese: 中国棋院; pinyin: Zhōngguó Qíyuàn) is an official agency responsible for board games and card games such as go, bridge, chess and Chinese chess affairs under the All-China Sports Federation of the People's Republic of China.

It oversees the Chinese Weiqi Association, the Chinese Chess Association, the Chinese Xiangqi Association and the Chinese Contract Bridge Association.

== List of presidents ==
1. Chen Zude: 1992 - 2003
2. Wang Runan (王汝南): 2003 - 2007
3. Hua Yigang (华以刚): 2007 – June 2009
4. Liu Siming (刘思明): June 2009 - January 2015
5. Zhu Guoping (朱国平): September 2018 - December 2024
6. He Fengxiang (贺凤翔): December 2024 - present

== See also ==
- Chess in China
