= An Cho-young =

South Korean Go player (born 1979)

An Choyoung
Personal information
- Native name: 안조영 (Korean); 安祚永 (Korean)
- Born: September 25, 1979 (age 46) South Korea

Sport
- Turned pro: 1993
- Rank: 9 dan
- Affiliation: Hanguk Kiwon

An Choyoung (Korean: 안조영; born September 25, 1979) is a professional Go player.

== Biography ==
An became a professional in 1993 at the age of 14. He was promoted to 8 dan in 2004, then 9 dan in 2005. He participated in the first China-Korea Kangwon-Land Cup where he won 2 games.

== Titles & runners-up ==
Title	Years Held
Current	3
(South Korea) Sibdang Cup	2007
(South Korea) BC Card Cup	2004
(South Korea) SK Gas Cup	1997

Title	Years Lost
Current	1
(South Korea) Kisung	2006
Defunct	2
(South Korea) Myungin	2002
(South Korea) Paewang	2002
Continental	1
(South Korea) China-Korea New Pro Wang	2004
