= Wang Xi (Go player) =

Chinese Go player (born 1984)

Wang Xi 王檄
Personal information
- Full name: Wang Xi
- Born: January 9, 1984 (age 42) Kaifeng, Henan, China

Sport
- Turned pro: 1997
- Rank: 9 dan
- Affiliation: Chinese Weiqi Association

Wang Xi
- Traditional Chinese: 王檄
- Simplified Chinese: 王檄
Transcriptions
Standard Mandarin
- Hanyu Pinyin: Wáng Xí

Wang Xi (Chinese: 王檄; pinyin: Wáng Xí ; born January 9, 1984) is a professional Go player.

== Biography ==
Wang was born in Kaifeng, Henan. He began playing Go at the very young age of 4. He was already enrolling in teams with professionals when he was only 8. In 1997, at the age of 13, Wang became a professional at the Zhongguo Qiyuan. The same year he entered the Chinese National Youth Squad. He was promoted to 3 dan in 1994, then 4 dan in 1999, and 5 dan in 2000. In 1999, he placed fifth at the National Youth Squad preliminary.

The biggest moment of his career came in 2004 when he reached the Samsung Cup final. Wang put up a good fight against Lee Sedol, but couldn't come through with the win. He had once participated in the Samsung Cup before, in 2002. The last few years have been good for Wang, as he has placed second place 4 times, He won his first title, the Liguang Cup in 2006.

== Promotion record ==
Rank	Year	Notes
1 dan	1997	Promoted to professional dan rank for performance in the Chinese professional qualification tournament.
2 dan	1998	
3 dan	1999	
4 dan	2000	
5 dan	2004	
6 dan	2006	Skipped due to the Chinese Weiqi Association promotion rules.
7 dan	2006	Skipped due to the Chinese Weiqi Association promotion rules.
8 dan	2006	Skipped due to the Chinese Weiqi Association promotion rules.
9 dan	2006	Won the 18th Asian TV Cup against Lee Changho.

== Titles & Runners-up ==
As of 29 November 2017

Domestic
Title	Wins	Runners-up
Xinren Wang		1 (2004)
Liguang Cup	1 (2006)	1 (2005)
National Mass Sports Meeting	1 (2006)	
National Go Individual	1 (2006)	
Changqi Cup	1 (2009)	
Longxing		1 (2010)
Xinan Wang	1 (2010)	1 (2006)
CCTV Cup	1 (2013)	1 (2006)
Total	6	5
International
Samsung Cup		1 (2004)
Asian TV Cup	1 (2006)	
Total	1	1
Career Total
Total	7	6
