= Piao Wenyao =

Chinese Go player

Personal information
- Native name: 朴文垚 / 박문요 (Chinese)
- Full name: Piao Wenyao / Park Moon-yo
- Born: April 25, 1988 (age 38) Heilongjiang, China

Sport
- Turned pro: 1999
- Teacher: Nie Weiping
- Rank: 9 dan
- Affiliation: Chinese Weiqi Association

Piao Wenyao (Chinese: 朴文垚; pinyin: Piáo Wényáo; Korean: 박문요; born April 25, 1988) is a Chinese professional Go player of Korean ethnicity currently residing in Harbin, Heilongjiang.

== Biography ==
Piao became a professional player at the age of 11 in 1999. He was promoted to a rank of 3 dan in 2001, and is currently 9 dan. Piao achieved his first international breakthrough in 2011 by winning the 15th LG Cup, defeating compatriot Kong Jie by a score of 2-0. Prior to winning the LG Cup, Piao's other international achievement was coming in runners up in the World Oza, where he lost 2-0 to Gu Li in the finals.

== Promotion record ==
Rank	Year	Notes
1 dan	1999	
2 dan	2001	
3 dan	2001	
4 dan	2005	
5 dan	2007	
6 dan		
7 dan		
8 dan		
9 dan	2011	Promoted from 5 dan to 9 dan for winning the 15th LG Cup.

== Titles and runners-up ==
Domestic
Title	Wins	Runners-up
Mingren		1 (2008)
Ahan Tongshan Cup		1 (2009)
Xinan Wang		1 (2010)
CCTV Cup	1 (2007)	
National Go Individual	1 (2010)	
Total	2	3

International
Title	Wins	Runners-up
LG Cup	1 (2011)	
World Oza		1 (2008)
Total	1	1

Total: 3 titles, 4 runners-up.
