= Kang Yoo-taek =

South Korean Go player

Kang Yootaek
Personal information
- Native name: 강유택 (Korean); 姜儒澤 (Korean)
- Full name: Kang Yootaek
- Born: 26 November 1991 (age 34) South Korea, South Korea

Sport
- Rank: 9 dan
- Affiliation: Hanguk Kiwon

Kang Yootaek (born 26 November 1991) is a Korean 9 dan professional Go player. He was ranked #13 (as of April 2011) in the official rating system of the Korea Baduk Association (the Hanguk Kiwon).

== Biography ==
Kang started to play Go at the age of 7. He is a member of the Yangchun Dail Baduk School. He became professional in 2007 by winning the Korean Insei league. He is ranked 9-dan.

== Titles and runners-up ==
Domestic
Title	Wins	Runners-up
(South Korea) Sibdan Cup		2010
