= Gu Lingyi =

Chinese Go player

Personal information
- Native name: 古灵益 (Chinese)
- Full name: Gu Lingyi
- Born: 3 July 1991 (age 34) China

Sport
- Turned pro: 2002
- Rank: 5 dan
- Affiliation: Chinese Weiqi Association

Gu Lingyi (Chinese: 古灵益; pinyin: Gǔ Língyì; born 3 July 1991) is a Chinese professional Go player.

Lingyi became a professional in 2002. He won his first title, the South-West Qiwang, in 2007. He challenged for the Mingren title in 2009, but lost to Gu Li.

== Promotion record ==
Rank	Year	Notes
1 dan	2002	
2 dan	2004	
3 dan	2005	
4 dan	2006	
5 dan	2007	
6 dan		
7 dan		
8 dan		
9 dan		

== Career record ==
- 2006: 37 wins, 26 losses
- 2007: 39 wins, 23 losses
- 2009: 41 wins, 20 losses
- 2010: 40 wins, 34 losses
- 2011: 15 wins, 7 losses

== Titles and runners-up ==
Domestic
Title	Wins	Runners-up
Mingren		1 (2009)
Qiwang	1 (2010)	
Longchen	1 (2010)	
CCTV Cup		1 (2010)
South-West Qiwang	4 (2007–2009, 2011)	
National Go Individual		1 (2006)
Total	6	3
