= Yun Jun-sang =

South Korean Go player

Yun Junsang
Personal information
- Native name: 윤준상 (Korean); 尹畯相 (Korean)
- Full name: Yun Junsang
- Born: 20 November 1987 (age 38) South Korea

Sport
- Turned pro: 2001
- Teacher: Kweon Kap-yong
- Rank: 9 dan
- Affiliation: Hanguk Kiwon

Yun Junsang (born 20 November 1987) is a professional Go player.

== Biography ==
Yun became a professional in 2001. He was promoted to 3 dan in 2004, 4 dan in 2005, and 5 dan in 2007 after winning the Guksu title. He is currently 9 dan. Yun broke a record in 2002 when he qualified for the first round of the 7th LG Cup. It was the shortest time between becoming a pro and entering an international tournament (3 months). In 2003, he just missed out on challenging Lee Chang-ho for the Kisung title when he lost to Cho Hunhyun in the challenger final, two games to one. In 2007, he won the Guksu title 3 to 1 over Lee Chang-ho.

== Promotion record ==
Rank	Year	Notes
1 dan	2001	
2 dan		
3 dan	2004	
4 dan	2006	
5 dan		
6 dan		
7 dan	2008	
8 dan	2010	
9 dan	2011	

== Career record ==
- 2006: 61 wins, 27 losses
- 2007: 49 wins, 27 losses
- 2008: 32 wins, 26 losses
- 2009: 38 wins, 21 losses
- 2010: 46 wins, 21 losses
- 2011: 27 wins, 6 losses

== Titles and runners-up ==
Domestic
Title	Wins	Runners-up
Guksu	1 (2006)	1 (2007)
Wangwi		1 (2007)
Prices Information Cup		1 (2011)
SK Gas Cup	1 (2007)	
New Pro Strongest		1 (2006)
Total	2	4

=== Korean Baduk League ===
Season	Team	Place	Record
2007	Team World Meridian	6th place	5–5
2008	Team Yeongnam Ilbo	Runners-up	13–5
2009	Team Hangame (Captain)	Runners-up	9–8
2010	Team Chungbuk and Konkuk Milk	Third place	11–6
2011	Team Hangame	TBD	3–0
