= Jiang Weijie =

Chinese professional Go player (born 1991)

Jiang Weijie 江维杰
Personal information
- Born: 17 October 1991 (age 34) Shanghai, China

Sport
- Turned pro: 2005
- Rank: 9 dan
- Affiliation: Zhongguo Qiyuan

Jiang Weijie
- Traditional Chinese: 江維杰
- Simplified Chinese: 江维杰
Transcriptions
Standard Mandarin
- Hanyu Pinyin: Jiāng Wéijié

Jiang Weijie (born 17 October 1991) is a Chinese professional Go player.

Jiang became a professional in 2005. He won his first title, the RICOH Xinxiu Cup, in 2008. Jiang ended Gu Li's six-year reign over the Mingren title, defeating Gu in the fifth and final game by resignation.

== Promotion record ==
Rank	Year	Notes
1 dan	2005	Promoted to professional dan rank after passing qualifying test.
2 dan	2006	
3 dan	2007	
4 dan	2008	
5 dan	2009	
6 dan	2012	Skipped over due to the Zhongguo Qiyuan promotion rules.
7 dan	2012	Skipped over due to the Zhongguo Qiyuan promotion rules.
8 dan	2012	Skipped over due to the Zhongguo Qiyuan promotion rules.
9 dan	2012	Won the 16th LG Cup against Lee Changho.

== Career record ==
- 2007: 29 wins, 15 losses
- 2009: 39 wins, 18 losses
- 2010: 32 wins, 23 losses

== Titles and Runners-up ==
As of 26 November 2017

Domestic
Title	Wins	Runners-up
Ricoh Xinxiu Cup	1 (2008)	
Mingren	2 (2010-2011)	1 (2012)
Quzhou-Lanke Cup		1 (2010)
Ricoh Xinxiu Cup	1 (2008)	
National Go Individual	1 (2009)	
Dachongjiu Cup	1 (2012)	
Total	6	2
Continental
World Mingren	1 (2012)	1 (2011)
Total	1	1
International
LG Cup	1 (2012)	
Total	1	0
Career Total
Total	8	3
