= Heo Young-ho =

South Korean Go player

Personal information
- Native name: 허영호 (Korean); 許映皓 (Korean)
- Born: 2 July 1986 (age 39) South Korea

Sport
- Rank: 9 dan
- Affiliation: Hanguk Kiwon

Heo Young-ho (Korean: 허영호; born 2 July 1986) is a Korean professional Go player.

== Biography ==
Heo became a 5 dan in 2006. Also in 2006, he won his first title, the BC Card Cup. His record for 2006 was 58 wins and 25 losses (75%).

== Promotion record ==
Rank	Year	Notes
1 dan		
2 dan		
3 dan		
4 dan	2005	
5 dan		
6 dan		
7 dan	2009	
8 dan	2010	Promoted from 7 dan to 8 dan for reaching the finals of the 15th Samsung Cup
9 dan	2011	

== Career record ==
- 2006: 58 wins, 25 losses
- 2007: 64 wins, 24 losses
- 2008: 33 wins, 18 losses
- 2009: 35 wins, 18 losses
- 2010: 66 wins, 20 losses

== Titles and runners-up ==
Domestic
Title	Wins	Runners-up
BC Card Cup	1 (2006)	
SK Gas Cup		1 (2007)
New Pro King	1 (2006)	
Total	2	1
International
Samsung Cup		1 (2010)
Total	0	1
Career total
Total	2	2

=== Korean Baduk League ===
Season	Team	Place	Record
2007	Team Yeongnam Ilbo	Champions	9–4
2008	Team Yeongnam Ilbo	Runners-up	12–6
2009	Team Batoo	Third place	7–6
2010	Team Chungbuk and Konkuk Milk	Third place	11–6
2011	Team Tbroad (Captain)	TBD	1–1
