= Kim Ji-seok (Go player) =

South Korean Go player

Personal information
- Native name: 김지석 (Korean); 金志錫 (Korean); Gim Jiseok (Revised Romanization); Kim Chisŏk (McCune–Reischauer)
- Born: 13 June 1989 (age 37) South Korea

Sport
- Turned pro: 2003
- Rank: 9 dan
- Affiliation: Korea Baduk Association

Kim Ji-seok (born 13 June 1989) is a Korean professional Go player.

An Younggil describes Jiseok's style as very aggressive.

== Promotion record ==
Rank	Year	Notes
1 dan	2003	
2 dan	2005	
3 dan	2006	
4 dan	2007	
5 dan	2009	
6 dan	2009	
7 dan	2010	
8 dan	2012	
9 dan	2013	

== Career record ==
- 2006: 44 wins, 26 losses
- 2007: 78 wins, 31 losses
- 2008: 37 wins, 24 losses
- 2009: 71 wins, 20 losses
- 2010: 47 wins, 22 losses
- 2011: 21 wins, 8 losses

== Titles and runners-up ==
Domestic
Title	Wins	Runners-up
Prices Information Cup	1 (2009)	
Chunwon		1 (2009)
Total	1	1

=== Korean Baduk League ===
Season	Team	Place	Record
2007	Team Yeongnam Ilbo	Champions	12–4
2008	Team Yeongnam Ilbo (Captain)	Runners-up	8–7
2009	Team Yeongnam Ilbo	Champions	12–3
2010	Team Yeongnam Ilbo (Captain)	9th place	9–7
2011	Team Yeongnam Ilbo (Captain)	TBD	2–1
