= Xie He (Go player) =

Chinese Go player

Personal information
- Native name: Trad. 謝赫 Simp. 谢赫 (Chinese); Xìe Hè (Pinyin)
- Full name: Xie He
- Born: May 14, 1984 (age 42) Qingdao, Shandong, China

Sport
- Turned pro: 1995
- Teacher: Cao Dayuan
- Rank: 9 dan
- Affiliation: Chinese Weiqi Association

Xie He
Medal record

Representing China

Asian Games
Silver medal – second place	2010 Guangzhou	Men's Team
Silver medal – second place	2010 Guangzhou	Mixed doubles

Xie He (Traditional: 謝赫; Simplified: 谢赫; Pinyin: Xìe Hè; born May 14, 1984) is a Chinese professional Go player.

Xie He was born in Qingdao, China. He started learning Go at the age of 6. He turned professional at 11 in 1995, and was promoted to 7 dan in 2007.

== Promotion record ==
Rank	Year	Notes
1 dan	1995	
2 dan		
3 dan		
4 dan		
5 dan	2002	
6 dan		
7 dan	2007	
8 dan		
9 dan	2012	

== Career record ==
- 2006: 58 wins, 25 losses.
- 2007: 37 wins, 17 losses.
- 2008: 47 wins, 24 losses.
- 2009: 29 wins, 23 losses.
- 2010: 51 wins, 21 losses.

== Titles and runners-up ==
Domestic
Title	Wins	Runners-up
Tianyuan		1 (2004)
Quzhou-Lanke Cup	1 (2010)	
RICOH Cup	1 (2005)	1 (2010)
CCTV Cup	1 (2008)	
National Go Individual	1 (2002)	1 (2005)
Bawang	1 (2002)	
Total	5	3
