= Chinese Weiqi Association =

Major go organization in China

Chinese Weiqi Association (Chinese: 中国围棋协会; pinyin: Zhōngguó Wéiqí Xiéhuì), or Chinese Go Association, founded in Hefei, Anhui, in 1962, is the major go organization in China. As a branch of the Zhongguo Qiyuan, it oversees professional players as well as strong amateurs, functioning in the same way as the Nihon Ki-in and other such groups.

Chinese Weiqi Association became a member of the International Go Federation in 1982.

== List of chairmen ==
- Li Menghua (李梦华): 1962–1988
- Chen Zude (陈祖德): 1988–2006
- Wang Runan (王汝南): 2006–2017
- Lin Jianchao (林建超): 29 December 2017–present
