= Female Go players =

This is an article about the history of female Go players in Asia and Europe.

== Social background ==
Female Go players are viewed to be a minority. This is due to these reasons:

- There are many male players but only few female players.
  - In Japan, there are no female winners at games without gender rules. Asami Ueno was the first female player who managed to be a finalist.
  - In China, there was no female 9-dan before Rui Naiwei.
  - Most players and winners at World championships are male.
- Not all female players are paid equally to male players. Joanne Missingham is known for her protests to this issue.

=== Comparison with female shogi players ===
In Japan, Go players are always compared with shogi players. This is because newspapers like The Asahi Shimbun treat them equal. But there is a big difference among female players. Female Go players usually belong to the same organization with others. But this does not happen for shogi. Female shogi players belong to the Ladies Professional Shogi Association (LPSA). The others belong to the Japan Shogi Association (JSA). Some LPSA players like Kana Satomi have tried to enter JSA. But currently, no one has entered.

== Promotion of female players ==
=== Europe ===
In Europe, there were no notable female players before Svetlana Shikshina and Diana Koszegi. In order to increase the number of female players, the European Go Federation is holding the European Women's Go Championship (EWGC) since 1996 and the European Pair Go Championship (EPGC) since 1997.

=== Japan ===
Kansai Ki-in has eased the age rules to female players. At Nihon Ki-in, there is a special exam for female players. Most female professionals (except Xie Yimin etc.) have got their pro status by this way. In 2019, Nihon Ki-in has started a female player test system to give more support to them. Nihon Ki-in is also sponsoring female amateur games.

==== Female Student Honinbo ====
This is a tournament operated with the All Japan Student Go Federation. Some winners have got pro status, or became top amateur players. Only players who cleared regional games can attend.

==== All Japan Female Amateur Go Championship ====
The All Japan Female Amateur Go Championship is the highest match for female amateur Go players. Some winners have become a pro. The next table shows the notable winners.

Year	Winner
1965	Tomoko Ogawa
1970–1971 and 1975	Kazuko Kanai
1977–1978, 1980, 1985 and 1987	Yoshiko Kamekura
1981–1984	Yasuko Yoshie
1990–1991 and 1993–1995	Akiko Sato
1997	Narumi Ohsawa
2000–2001	Mieko Nakajima
2002 and 2013	Maya Ohsawa (Narumi Ohsawa's sister. The Ohsawa sisters became the first sisters to win at here)
2003	Kaori Mukai (Chiaki Mukai's sister, now known as Kaori Mimura)
2004	Miori Shimosaka
2005 and 2007	Akane Ishii (currently known as Akane Tatsumi)
2014–2015	Akiko Fujiwara
2016	Reina Oshima
2017	Saeka Iwata

Kaori Chinen, Yukari Yoshihara and Rina Fujisawa also participated in this championship before becoming a pro.

== World Ranking Changes by Year ==
Since 1986, five female Go players have held the top spot.

Female Go Player Ranking
Year	1st	2nd	3rd
1986-1989	Rui Naiwei	Zhang Xuan	Feng Yun
1990-1993	Rui Naiwei	Zhang Xuan	Yang Hui
1994-1997	Rui Naiwei	Zhang Xuan	Feng Yun
1998-2003	Rui Naiwei	Cho Hyeyeon	Zhang Xuan
2004	Rui Naiwei	Cho Hyeyeon	Park Jieun
2005	Cho Hyeyeon	Rui Naiwei	Park Jieun
2006-2007	Rui Naiwei	Cho Hyeyeon	Park Jieun
2008-2010	Rui Naiwei	Li He	Qiao Shiyao
2011	Rui Naiwei	Yu Zhiying	Choi Jeong
2012	Rui Naiwei	Choi Jeong	Yu Zhiying
2013-2015	Yu Zhiying	Choi Jeong	Rui Naiwei
2016	Yu Zhiying	Choi Jeong	Oh Yujin
2017-2019	Choi Jeong	Yu Zhiying	Oh Yujin
2020-2023	Choi Jeong	Yu Zhiying	Zhou Hongyu
2024	Choi Jeong	Kim Eunji	Zhou Hongyu
2025	Kim Eunji	Choi Jeong	Tang Jiawen
2026	Kim Eunji	Choi Jeong	Zhou Hongyu
