= Go at the 2008 World Mind Sports Games =

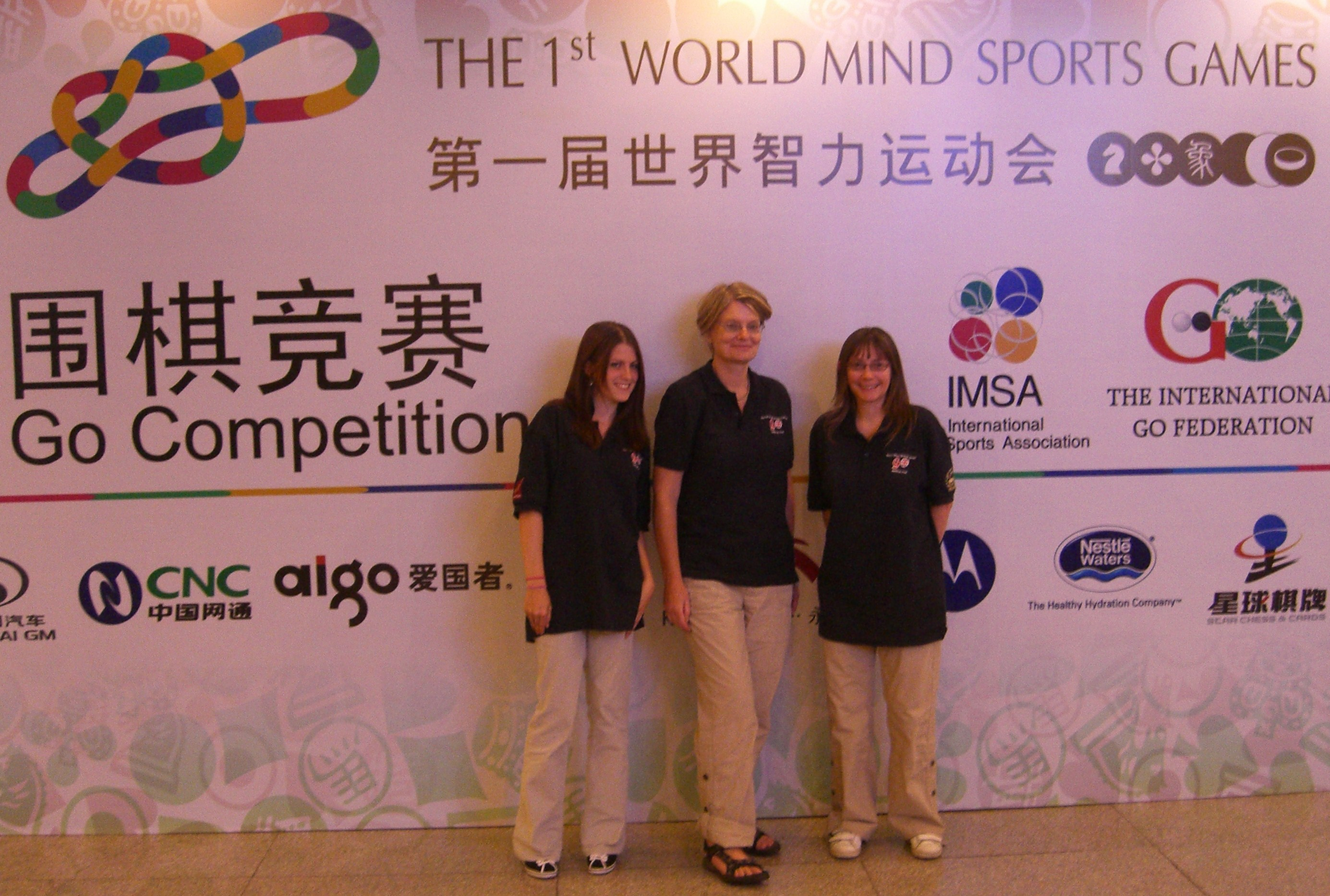
The British Go Association's UK players for the Individual Women's Go event, at the 1st WMSG held in Beijing in 2008

The ancient board game of Go was one of the 5 mind sports which featured at the inaugural World Mind Sports Games, held in Beijing, China in October 2008. There were six gold medals in Go events, within thirty-five gold medals vied for by 2,763 competitors (560 of whom were Go players), from 143 countries.

One feature of this Go games is that it was the first time in history an international tournament of professional Go used the Proposed Rules of Go conceived by Toshio Ikeda (1923-1974). This was deemed as an important trial of unifying the rules of Go.

== About the rules ==
There are no unified rules of Go. The two major scoring systems are so-called scoring by area and scoring by territory. Toshio Ikeda, a Japanese electrical engineer then working for Fujitsu, began his study on the rules in late 1960s, and published his work by a book On The Rules Of Go. Ikeda argued that the Chinese rules of Go, which use scoring by area, are almost perfect, except for one drawback, which was shown in an example named "the problem of reinforcing". In fact, the focus issue is, how to define "the last competitive move". Ikeda found the solution, that is, to redefine the end of the game, and neutralize the value of the last move.

Ikeda died in 1974. In 1990s, Chen Zu-yuan, a Chinese engineer and amateur Go player, published his study on the rules of Go by a book, in which he introduced Ikeda's work to Chinese readers. Chen does not like Ikeda's design, but after years of pondering, Chen made a compromise and proposed to WMSG to use this design in the inaugural 2008 games.

== Medal table ==
Under the auspices of the International Go Federation 560 players participated in six medal events in Beijing. South Korea won half of the 18 medals and all were swept by competitors from Eastern Asia.

Event	Gold	Silver	Bronze
Men's Individual	(South Korea) Kang Dongyun 7p (Note: The numbers and letters after the players' names refer to their professional or amateur ranks.)	(South Korea) Park Jungsang 9p	(China) Li Zhe 6p
Women's Individual	(China) Song Ronghui 1p	(South Korea) Lee Minjin 5p	(South Korea) Pak Chi-eun 9p
Open	(North Korea) Jo Tae-Won 7d	(South Korea) Ham Youngwoo 7d	(South Korea) Lee Yong Hee 6d
Men's Team	South Korea	China	Japan
Women's Team	China	South Korea	Japan
Pair Go	(China) Huang Yizhong 7p ／ Fan Weijing 2p	(Chinese Taipei) Chou Chun-Hsun 9p ／ Hsieh Yi-Min 4p	(South Korea) On So Jin 4p ／ Lee Ha Jin 3p

== Events ==
Note that the sections below show only the latter stages of the competition, after the qualifying rounds.

=== Men's Individual ===
up to 5 players per team.

Round of 16
(South Korea) Kang Dong Yoon 8p	1
(Japan) Yamashiro Hiroshi 9p	0
(Chinese Taipei) Chang Li-Yu 7p	0
(China) Gu Li 9p	1
(South Korea) Mok Jin Seuk 9p	0
(China) Li Zhe 6p	1
(Canada) Li Xianyu 6d	0
(Japan) Yamada Kimio 9p	1
(China) Wang Xi 9p	1
(South Korea) Baek Hong Suk 6p	0
(Chinese Taipei) Lee Yi-Hsiu 4p	0
(China) Liu Xing 7p	1
(South Korea) Park Jung Sang 9p	1
(Chinese Taipei) Wang Lih-Chen 9p	0
(Japan) Mimura Tomoyasu 9p	0
(South Korea) Park Young Hun 9p	1

Quarter-finals
(South Korea) Kang Dong Yoon 8p	1
(China) Gu Li 9p	0
(China) Li Zhe 6p	1
(Japan) Yamada Kimio 9p	0
(China) Wang Xi 9p	1
(China) Liu Xing 7p	0
(South Korea) Park Jung Sang 9p	1
(South Korea) Park Young Hun 9p	0

Semi-finals
(South Korea) Kang Dong Yoon 8p	1
(China) Li Zhe 6p	0
(China) Wang Xi 9p	0
(South Korea) Park Jung Sang 9p	1

Final
(South Korea) Kang Dong Yoon 8p	1
(South Korea) Park Jung Sang 9p	0
Third place
(China) Li Zhe 6p	1
(China) Wang Xi 9p	0

=== Women's Individual ===
up to 3 players per team.

Quarter-finals
(South Korea) Lee Min Jin 5p	1
(China) Rui Naiwei 9p	0
(Japan) Mannami Kana 4p	1
(China) Cao Youyin 2p	0
(China) Song Ronghui 1p	1
(Japan) Ina Akiko 5p	0
(Australia) Joanne Missingham 1p	0
(South Korea) Park Ji Eun 9p	1

Semi-finals
(South Korea) Lee Min Jin 5p	1
(Japan) Mannami Kana 4p	0
(China) Song Ronghui 1p	1
(South Korea) Park Ji Eun 9p	0

Final
(South Korea) Lee Min Jin 5p	0
(China) Song Ronghui 1p	1
Third place
(Japan) Mannami Kana 4p	0
(South Korea) Park Ji Eun 9p	1

=== Open ===
2 amateur players per team.

Quarter-finals
(China) Hu Yuqing 8d	0
(South Korea) Lee Yong Hee 6d	1
(North Korea) Jo Tae Won 7d	1
(South Africa) Chow Guang 6d	0
(South Korea) Ham Youngwoo 7d	1
(United States) Jie Li 7d	0
(Canada) Yongfei Ge 7d	0
(China) Wang Chen 6d	1

Semi-finals
(South Korea) Lee Yong Hee 6d	0
(North Korea) Jo Tae Won 7d	1
(South Korea) Ham Youngwoo 7d	1
(China) Wang Chen 6d	0

Final
(North Korea) Jo Tae Won 7d	1
(South Korea) Ham Youngwoo 7d	0
Third place
(South Korea) Lee Yong Hee 6d	1
(China) Wang Chen 6d	0

=== Men's team ===
5 players with 1 substitute per team. (5 separate games per round, team with 3+ game wins wins).

Quarter-finals
South Korea	5
Czech Republic	0
North Korea	0
Japan	5
Chinese Taipei	5
Hong Kong	0
Ukraine	0
China	5

Semi-finals
South Korea	4
Japan	1
Chinese Taipei	1
China	4

Final
South Korea	4
China	1
Third place
Japan	3
Chinese Taipei	2

=== Women's team ===
3 players with 1 substitute per team. (3 separate games per round, team with 2+ game wins wins the round).

Quarter-finals
South Korea	3
United Kingdom	0
North Korea	2
Chinese Taipei	1
Japan	3
Australia	0
Germany	0
China	3

Semi-finals
South Korea	2
North Korea	1
Japan	1
China	2

Final
South Korea	1
China	2
Third place
North Korea	0
Japan	3

=== Pair Go ===
1 male-female pair playing alternate moves without consultation

  - Moves sequenced: black female, white female, black male, white male.

Round of 16
(South Korea) Hong Sung Ji 6p (South Korea) Kim Eun Seon 3p	1
(China) Liu Lirong 5d (China) Wang Xiangru 5d	0
(Ukraine) Iurii Pliushch 5d (Ukraine) Mariya Zakharchenko 1k	0
(Chinese Taipei) Chou Chun-Hsun 9p (Chinese Taipei) Hsieh Yi-Min 4p	1
(China) Yu Bin 9p (China) Li He 1p	1
(Hungary) Tibor Pocsai (Hungary) Rita Pocsai	0
(South Korea) Hong Seok Ui 6d (South Korea) Kim Shin Young 5d	1
(Japan) Toshiya Imamura 9p (Japan) Kazuko Konishi 8p	0
(Chinese Taipei) Lin Chih-Han 8p (Chinese Taipei) Chang Kai-Hsin 3p	1
(Japan) Satoshi Hiraoka 8d (Japan) Yuriko Hiraoka 5d	0
(North Korea) Jo Tae Won 7d (North Korea) Jo Sae Byol 7d	0
(South Korea) On So Jin 4p (South Korea) Lee Ha Jin 3p	1
(Japan) Satoru Kobayashi 9p (Japan) Kumiko Kanazawa 5p	1
(Czech Republic) Jan Hora 6d (Czech Republic) Jitka Bartova 3k	0
(Mongolia) Sansar Tsolmon 4d (Mongolia) Tungalag Ravjir 3d	0
(China) Huang Yizhong 7p (China) Fan Weijing 2p	1

Quarter-finals
(South Korea) Hong Sung Ji 6p (South Korea) Kim Eun Seon 3p	0
(Chinese Taipei) Chou Chun-Hsun 9p (Chinese Taipei) Hsieh Yi-Min 4p	1
(China) Yu Bin 9p (China) Li He 1p	1
(South Korea) Hong Seok Ui 6d (South Korea) Kim Shin Young 5d	0
(Chinese Taipei) Lin Chih-Han 8p (Chinese Taipei) Chang Kai-Hsin 3p	0
(South Korea) On So Jin 4p (South Korea) Lee Ha Jin 3p	1
(Japan) Satoru Kobayashi 9p (Japan) Kumiko Kanazawa 5p	0
(China) Huang Yizhong 7p (China) Fan Weijing 2p	1

Semi-finals
(Chinese Taipei) Chou Chun-Hsun 9p (Chinese Taipei) Hsieh Yi-Min 4p	1
(China) Yu Bin 9p (China) Li He 1p	0
(South Korea) On So Jin 4p (South Korea) Lee Ha Jin 3p	0
(China) Huang Yizhong 7p (China) Fan Weijing 2p	1

Final
(Chinese Taipei) Chou Chun-Hsun 9p (Chinese Taipei) Hsieh Yi-Min 4p	0
(China) Huang Yizhong 7p (China) Fan Weijing 2p	1
Third place
(China) Yu Bin 9p (China) Li He 1p	0
(South Korea) On So Jin 4p (South Korea) Lee Ha Jin 3p	1

== See also ==
- Go at the 2012 World Mind Sports Games
