= Go at the 2010 Asian Games – Women's team =

Women's team at the 2010 Asian Games
- Venue: Guangzhou Chess Institute
- Date: 23–26 November 2010
- Competitors: 27 from 7 nations

Medalists
| gold medal | South Korea; Lee Min-jin, Kim Yoon-yeong, Cho Hye-yeon, Lee Seul-a |
| silver medal | China; Wang Chenxing, Rui Naiwei, Song Ronghui, Tang Yi |
| bronze medal | Chinese Taipei; Hsieh Yi-min, Joanne Missingham, Chang Cheng-ping, Wang Jing-yi |

The women's team competition at the 2010 Asian Games in Guangzhou, China was held from 23 November to 26 November at the Guangzhou Chess Institute. The time was one hour for each side and 30 seconds byoyomi for three times.

After the preliminary round, teams were ranked based on the number of wins, game points and the number of wins by their captains.

== Schedule ==
All times are China Standard Time (UTC+08:00)

| Date | Time | Event |
|---|---|---|
| Tuesday, 23 November 2010 | 09:30 | Round 1 |
| Tuesday, 23 November 2010 | 15:00 | Round 2 |
| Wednesday, 24 November 2010 | 09:30 | Round 3 |
| Wednesday, 24 November 2010 | 15:00 | Round 4 |
| Thursday, 25 November 2010 | 09:30 | Round 5 |
| Thursday, 25 November 2010 | 15:00 | Round 6 |
| Friday, 26 November 2010 | 09:30 | Round 7 |
| Friday, 26 November 2010 | 15:00 | Finals |

== Results ==
=== Preliminary round ===
==== Round 1 ====
| | Score | |
|---|---|---|
| China | 6–0 | Bye |
| Wang Chenxing | 2–0 | |
| Rui Naiwei | 2–0 | |
| Song Ronghui | 2–0 | |
| Chinese Taipei | 6–0 | Thailand |
| Hsieh Yi-min | 2–0 | Waraphan Nawaruk |
| Joanne Missingham | 2–0 | Pattraporn Aroonphaichitra |
| Chang Cheng-ping | 2–0 | Simaporn Setthawong |
| Malaysia | 0–6 | North Korea |
| Suzanne Low | 0–2 | Hwang Kyong-ju |
| Fong Sok Nee | 0–2 | Jo Sae-byol |
| Lim Shu Wen | 0–2 | Kim Yu-mi |
| Japan | 2–4 | South Korea |
| Ayumi Suzuki | 0–2 | Lee Min-jin |
| Mika Yoshida | 0–2 | Kim Yoon-yeong |
| Chiaki Mukai | 2–0 | Cho Hye-yeon |

==== Round 2 ====
| | Score | |
|---|---|---|
| Bye | 0–6 | South Korea |
| | 0–2 | Lee Min-jin |
| | 0–2 | Kim Yoon-yeong |
| | 0–2 | Cho Hye-yeon |
| North Korea | 0–6 | Japan |
| Hwang Kyong-ju | 0–2 | Ayumi Suzuki |
| Jo Sae-byol | 0–2 | Mika Yoshida |
| Kim Yu-mi | 0–2 | Chiaki Mukai |
| Thailand | 2–4 | Malaysia |
| Waraphan Nawaruk | 0–2 | Suzanne Low |
| Pattraporn Aroonphaichitra | 0–2 | Fong Sok Nee |
| Simaporn Setthawong | 2–0 | Lim Shu Wen |
| China | 4–2 | Chinese Taipei |
| Wang Chenxing | 0–2 | Hsieh Yi-min |
| Rui Naiwei | 2–0 | Joanne Missingham |
| Song Ronghui | 2–0 | Chang Cheng-ping |

==== Round 3 ====
| | Score | |
|---|---|---|
| Chinese Taipei | 6–0 | Bye |
| Hsieh Yi-min | 2–0 | |
| Joanne Missingham | 2–0 | |
| Chang Cheng-ping | 2–0 | |
| Malaysia | 0–6 | China |
| Suzanne Low | 0–2 | Wang Chenxing |
| Fong Sok Nee | 0–2 | Song Ronghui |
| Lim Shu Wen | 0–2 | Tang Yi |
| Japan | 6–0 | Thailand |
| Mika Yoshida | 2–0 | Pattraporn Aroonphaichitra |
| Chiaki Mukai | 2–0 | Simaporn Setthawong |
| Narumi Osawa | 2–0 | Krongkamon Mekmok |
| South Korea | 4–2 | North Korea |
| Lee Min-jin | 2–0 | Hwang Kyong-ju |
| Cho Hye-yeon | 2–0 | Jo Sae-byol |
| Lee Seul-a | 0–2 | Kim Yu-mi |

==== Round 4 ====
| | Score | |
|---|---|---|
| Bye | 0–6 | North Korea |
| | 0–2 | Hwang Kyong-ju |
| | 0–2 | Jo Sae-byol |
| | 0–2 | Kim Yu-mi |
| Thailand | 0–6 | South Korea |
| Waraphan Nawaruk | 0–2 | Lee Min-jin |
| Pattraporn Aroonphaichitra | 0–2 | Cho Hye-yeon |
| Simaporn Setthawong | 0–2 | Lee Seul-a |
| China | 6–0 | Japan |
| Rui Naiwei | 2–0 | Ayumi Suzuki |
| Song Ronghui | 2–0 | Mika Yoshida |
| Tang Yi | 2–0 | Chiaki Mukai |
| Chinese Taipei | 6–0 | Malaysia |
| Hsieh Yi-min | 2–0 | Suzanne Low |
| Chang Cheng-ping | 2–0 | Fong Sok Nee |
| Wang Jing-yi | 2–0 | Lim Shu Wen |

==== Round 5 ====
| | Score | |
|---|---|---|
| Malaysia | 6–0 | Bye |
| Suzanne Low | 2–0 | |
| Fong Sok Nee | 2–0 | |
| Lim Shu Wen | 2–0 | |
| Japan | 2–4 | Chinese Taipei |
| Ayumi Suzuki | 2–0 | Hsieh Yi-min |
| Mika Yoshida | 0–2 | Joanne Missingham |
| Narumi Osawa | 0–2 | Chang Cheng-ping |
| South Korea | 2–4 | China |
| Kim Yoon-yeong | 0–2 | Rui Naiwei |
| Cho Hye-yeon | 2–0 | Song Ronghui |
| Lee Seul-a | 0–2 | Tang Yi |
| North Korea | 6–0 | Thailand |
| Hwang Kyong-ju | 2–0 | Pattraporn Aroonphaichitra |
| Jo Sae-byol | 2–0 | Simaporn Setthawong |
| Kim Yu-mi | 2–0 | Krongkamon Mekmok |

==== Round 6 ====
| | Score | |
|---|---|---|
| Bye | 0–6 | Thailand |
| | 0–2 | Waraphan Nawaruk |
| | 0–2 | Pattraporn Aroonphaichitra |
| | 0–2 | Simaporn Setthawong |
| China | 6–0 | North Korea |
| Wang Chenxing | 2–0 | Hwang Kyong-ju |
| Song Ronghui | 2–0 | Jo Sae-byol |
| Tang Yi | 2–0 | Kim Yu-mi |
| Chinese Taipei | 2–4 | South Korea |
| Hsieh Yi-min | 2–0 | Lee Min-jin |
| Joanne Missingham | 0–2 | Cho Hye-yeon |
| Wang Jing-yi | 0–2 | Lee Seul-a |
| Malaysia | 0–6 | Japan |
| Suzanne Low | 0–2 | Mika Yoshida |
| Fong Sok Nee | 0–2 | Chiaki Mukai |
| Lim Shu Wen | 0–2 | Narumi Osawa |

==== Round 7 ====
| | Score | |
|---|---|---|
| Japan | 6–0 | Bye |
| Ayumi Suzuki | 2–0 | |
| Mika Yoshida | 2–0 | |
| Chiaki Mukai | 2–0 | |
| South Korea | 6–0 | Malaysia |
| Lee Min-jin | 2–0 | Suzanne Low |
| Kim Yoon-yeong | 2–0 | Lim Shu Wen |
| Lee Seul-a | 2–0 | Chow Zhi Mei |
| North Korea | 4–2 | Chinese Taipei |
| Hwang Kyong-ju | 0–2 | Hsieh Yi-min |
| Jo Sae-byol | 2–0 | Joanne Missingham |
| Kim Yu-mi | 2–0 | Wang Jing-yi |
| Thailand | 0–6 | China |
| Waraphan Nawaruk | 0–2 | Wang Chenxing |
| Pattraporn Aroonphaichitra | 0–2 | Song Ronghui |
| Simaporn Setthawong | 0–2 | Tang Yi |

==== Summary ====
| Rank | Team | Round | | | | | | | Total | GP |
| Rank | Team | 1 | 2 | 3 | 4 | 5 | 6 | 7 | Total | GP |
|---|---|---|---|---|---|---|---|---|---|---|
| 1 | China (CHN) | 2 | 2 | 2 | 2 | 2 | 2 | 2 | 14 | 38 |
| 2 | South Korea (KOR) | 2 | 2 | 2 | 2 | 0 | 2 | 2 | 12 | 32 |
| 3 | Chinese Taipei (TPE) | 2 | 0 | 2 | 2 | 2 | 0 | 0 | 8 | 28 |
| 4 | Japan (JPN) | 0 | 2 | 2 | 0 | 0 | 2 | 2 | 8 | 28 |
| 5 | North Korea (PRK) | 2 | 0 | 0 | 2 | 2 | 0 | 2 | 8 | 24 |
| 6 | Malaysia (MAS) | 0 | 2 | 0 | 0 | 2 | 0 | 0 | 4 | 10 |
| 7 | Thailand (THA) | 0 | 0 | 0 | 0 | 0 | 2 | 0 | 2 | 8 |

=== Final round ===
==== Bronze medal match ====
| | Score | |
|---|---|---|
| Japan | 2–4 | Chinese Taipei |
| Ayumi Suzuki | 0–2 | Hsieh Yi-min |
| Mika Yoshida | 0–2 | Joanne Missingham |
| Chiaki Mukai | 2–0 | Chang Cheng-ping |

==== Gold medal match ====
| | Score | |
|---|---|---|
| China | 2–4 | South Korea |
| Rui Naiwei | 0–2 | Lee Min-jin |
| Song Ronghui | 0–2 | Kim Yoon-yeong |
| Tang Yi | 2–0 | Cho Hye-yeon |
