= Women's Guksu =

South Korean Go competition

The Women's Guksu or Women's Kuksu (Korean: 여자국수전; Hanja: 女子國手戰; RR: Yeojaguksujeon), officially Pro Woman Baduk Masters, is a South Korean women's Go competition. The tournament was established in 1994 and is held annually (except 2001 and 2004). It is organized by The Korea Economic Daily.

The name guksu, with Sino-Korean etymology from guk 'nation' and su 'hand', is shared with the now-discontinued Guksu competition which had no gender restriction.

The winner's prize is 30 million won and the runner-up's prize is 10 million won (since 2023). Formerly, the winner's prize was 12 million won in 2018, 15 million won in 2019 and 2020, 20 million won in 2021, and 25 million won in 2022. Since 2024, the tournament uses an increment-based time control (Fischer time), with 30 minutes of main time plus 30 seconds per move.

== Winners and runners-up ==
Women's Guksu
No.	Year	Winner	Score	Runner-up
1	1994	Yoon Young Sun	2–1	Kim Min-hui
2	1995	Yoon Young Sun	2–0	Lee Yeong-sin
3	1996	Yoon Young Sun	2–0	Lee Jeong-won
4	1997	Lee Yeong-sin	2–1	Hong Kkotnoeul
5	1998	Yoon Young Sun	2–1	Hwang Yeom
6	1999	Rui Naiwei	2–0	Lee Ji-hyeon
7	2000	Rui Naiwei	2–1	Cho Hye-yeon
8	2002	Rui Naiwei	2–0	Cho Hye-yeon
9	2003	Cho Hye-yeon	2–0	Rui Naiwei
10	2005	Cho Hye-yeon	2–0	Yoon Young Sun
11	2006	Rui Naiwei	2–0	Cho Hye-yeon
12	2007	Rui Naiwei	2–0	Cho Hye-yeon
13	2008	Park Ji-eun	2–1	Lee Min-jin
14	2009	Rui Naiwei	2–0	Lee Ha-jin
15	2010	Rui Naiwei	2–0	Cho Hye-yeon
16	2011	Rui Naiwei	2–0	Kim Yun-yeong
17	2012	Park Ji-yeon	2–1	Park Ji-eun
18	2013	Kim Hye-min	2–0	Park Ji-yeon
19	2014	Kim Chae-yeong	2–1	Park Ji-eun
20	2015	Park Ji-yeon	2–1	Kim Sin-yeong
21	2016	Oh Yu-jin	2–1	Oh Jeong-a
22	2017	Choi Jeong	2–0	Kim Chae-yeong
23	2018	Choi Jeong	2–1	Lee Seul-a
24	2019	Choi Jeong	2–0	Oh Yu-jin
25	2020	Choi Jeong	2–0	Kim Hye-min
26	2021	Oh Yu-jin	2–1	Choi Jeong
27	2022	Choi Jeong	2–0	Kim Hye-min
28	2023	Choi Jeong	2–1	Kim Chae-yeong
29	2024	Kim Chae-yeong	2–0	Nakamura Sumire
30	2025	Kim Eun-ji	2–1	Choi Jeong
