= Wu Qingyuan Cup =

International women's Go competition

The Wu Qingyuan Cup, also known as the Go Seigen Cup or Wu Qingyuan Cup World Women's Weiqi Tournament (Chinese: 吴清源杯世界女子围棋赛), is an international women's Go tournament. It was created in 2018 and is held annually. The tournament is named after Wu Qingyuan (better known by his Japanese name Go Seigen), and held in Fuzhou, Fujian Province, China, his birthplace. It is organized by the Chinese Weiqi Association and the Fuzhou municipical government.

== Overview ==
The Wu Qingyuan Cup is played under Chinese rules with a 7.5 point komi. Each player has 2 hours of main time with five 60-second byoyomi periods. The winner receives 500,000 RMB in prize money, and the runner-up receives 200,000 RMB.

== Past tournaments ==
The 1st Wu Qingyuan Cup winner was Kim Chae-young, who defeated Choi Jeong, a two-time women's world champion, in a 2–0 upset. Kim's head-to-head record against Choi had been 0–11 before the match.

Choi Jeong won the 2nd Wu Qingyuan Cup. It was her fifth women's international title, after four previous victories in the Bingsheng Cup. The tournament was also accompanied by a side event featuring 10-year old Nakamura Sumire 1p and 13-year old Wu Yiming 2p; Wu won 2–0, earning her a spot in the 3rd Cup.

In the 3rd Wu Qingyuan Cup, all four semifinalists were Chinese players. The winner was 18-year old Zhou Hongyu.

On 4 December 2021, Choi Jeong defeated Yu Zhiying and won the 4th Wu Qingyuan Cup.

In 2023, Choi Jeong won the tournament for the third time. The runner-up was Japan's Fujisawa Rina, who made her first appearance as a finalist in international competition.

The 2024 winner was Ueno Asami, the first Japanese player to win the championship.

== Winners and runners-up ==
| Edition | Year | Winner | Score | Runner-up |
|---|---|---|---|---|
| 1st | 2018 | (South Korea) Kim Chae-young | 2–0 | (South Korea) Choi Jeong |
| 2nd | 2019 | (South Korea) Choi Jeong | 2–0 | (China) Wang Chenxing |
| 3rd | 2020 | (China) Zhou Hongyu | 2–1 | (China) Yu Zhiying |
| 4th | 2021 | (South Korea) Choi Jeong | 2–1 | (China) Yu Zhiying |
| 5th | 2022 | (South Korea) Oh Yu-jin | 2–0 | (China) Wang Chenxing |
| 6th | 2023 | (South Korea) Choi Jeong | 2–0 | (Japan) Fujisawa Rina |
| 7th | 2024 | (Japan) Ueno Asami | 2–1 | (China) Tang Jiawen |
| 8th | 2025 | (South Korea) Kim Eun-ji | 2–1 | (South Korea) Choi Jeong |
