= Women's Meijin =

Japanese Go competition

The Women's Meijin (女流名人戦, Joryū Meijin-sen) is a Go competition. The Women's Meijin is the female version of the Meijin title. This title is sponsored by Fuji Evening Newspaper and Nippon Life Insurance. The winner's purse is 5,100,000 Yen ($48,000).

The tournament was not held in 2020 due to loss of sponsorship, but resumed for the 32nd tournament in 2021 with a new sponsor.

== Past winners ==
Winners in chronological order:

	Year	Winner	Score	Runner-up
1.	1989	Miyazaki Shimako		
2.	1990	Aoki Kikuyo		
3.	1991	Sugiuchi Kazuko	2–1	Aoki Kikuyo
4.	1992	Sugiuchi Kazuko	2–0	Aoki Kikuyo
5.	1993	Sugiuchi Kazuko	2–0	Aoki Kikuyo
6.	1994	Sugiuchi Kazuko	2–1	Ogawa Tomoko
7.	1995	Kato Tomoko	2–0	Sugiuchi Kazuko
8.	1996	Nishida Terumi	2–1	Kato Tomoko
9.	1997	Nishida Terumi	2–0	Ogawa Tomoko
10.	1998	Nishida Terumi	2–0	Ogawa Tomoko
11.	1999	Aoki Kikuyo	2–0	Nishida Terumi
12.	2000	Aoki Kikuyo	2–0	Kobayashi Izumi
13.	2001	Kobayashi Izumi	2–0	Aoki Kikuyo
14.	2002	Aoki Kikuyo	2–0	Kobayashi Izumi
15.	2003	Kobayashi Izumi	2–0	Aoki Kikuyo
16.	2004	Kobayashi Izumi	2–0	Inori Yoko
17.	2005	Koyama Terumi	2–1	Kobayashi Izumi
18.	2006	Aoki Kikuyo	2–0	Koyama Terumi
19.	2007	Kato Keiko	2–1	Aoki Kikuyo
20.	2008	Xie Yimin	2–0	Kato Keiko
21.	2009	Xie Yimin	2–1	Chinen Kaori
22.	2010	Xie Yimin	2–0	Mukai Chiaki
23.	2011	Xie Yimin	2–1	Mukai Chiaki
24.	2012	Xie Yimin	2–0	Mukai Chiaki
25.	2013	Xie Yimin	2–0	Okuda Aya
26.	2014	Xie Yimin	2–1	Kato Keiko
27.	2015	Xie Yimin	2–0	Suzuki Ayumi
28.	2016	Xie Yimin	2–1	Aoki Kikuyo
29.	2017	Fujisawa Rina	2–0	Xie Yimin
30.	2018	Fujisawa Rina	2–0	Yashiro Kumiko
31.	2019	Fujisawa Rina	2–1	Xie Yimin
32.	2021	Fujisawa Rina	2–0	Ueno Asami
33.	2022	Fujisawa Rina	2–0	Nakamura Sumire
34.	2023	Ueno Asami	2–0	Fujisawa Rina
35.	2024	Fujisawa Rina	2–0	Ueno Asami
36.	2025	Ueno Asami	2–0	Fujisawa Rina
37.	2026	Ueno Asami	2–0	Fujisawa Rina

Winners by number of titles:

Player	Titles	Years Held
Xie Yimin	9	2008–2016
Fujisawa Rina	6	2017–2022, 2024
Aoki Kikuyo	5	1990, 1999, 2000, 2002, 2006
Sugiuchi Kazuko	4	1991–1994
Kobayashi Izumi	3	2001, 2003, 2004
Nishida Terumi	3	1996–1998
Ueno Asami	3	2023, 2025–2026
Kato Keiko	1	2007
Kato Tomoko	1	1995
Koyama Terumi	1	2005
Miyazaki Shimako	1	1989
