= Women's Saikyo =

The Women's Saikyo (Strongest) is a Go competition. The tournament was discontinued in 2008. In 2016, the tournament restarted with new sponsor, SENKO Co., Ltd.

== Outline ==
The Women's Saikyo was sponsored by Tokyo Seimitsu up to 2008. The winner's purse was 4,500,000 yen ($42,000).

In 2016, the tournament got new sponsor and restarted its cycle. The official name for the new tournament is Senko Cup Female Saikyo. The winner's purse is ¥8,000,000, while the runner up gets ¥4,500,000. The thinking time was 3 hours with 5 minutes byo-yomi. Hsieh Yimin won the first edition by beating Chiaki Mukai in the final.

== Past winners ==
Player	Years Held
Shinkai Hiroko	1999, 2004
Kato Tomoko	2000
Aoki Kikuyo	2001
Yumiko Okada	2002
Suzuki Ayumi	2003
Kobayashi Izumi	2005
Xie Yimin	2006
Suzuki Ayumi	2007
Kato Keiko	2008

== Senko Cup ==
Senko Cup
No.	Year	Winner	Runner up
1	2016	Hsieh Yimin	Mukai Chiaki
2	2017	Fujisawa Rina	Hsieh Yimin
3	2018	Mannami Nao	Nyu Eiko
4	2019	Fujisawa Rina	Hsieh Yimin
5	2020	Ueno Asami	Hsieh Yimin
6	2021	Fujisawa Rina	Ueno Asami
7	2022	Nyu Eiko	Nakamura Sumire
8	2023	Nyu Eiko	Ueno Asami
9	2024	Fujisawa Rina	Ueno Asami
10	2025	Ueno Risa	Fujisawa Rina
