= Bingsheng Cup =

International women's Go competition

The Bingsheng Cup (Chinese: 兵圣杯; pinyin: Bīngshèng Bēi) was an international women's Go tournament. It was held annually from 2010 to 2019, a total of 10 times. The tournament was held at Qionglong Mountain in Suzhou, Jiangsu, China. It is also known as the Qionglong Mountain Bingsheng Cup. The name bingsheng is in honor of Sun Tzu, who is said to have written The Art of War at Qionglong Mountain; the historicity of Sun Tzu is uncertain.

== Rules ==
The Bingsheng Cup was a Go competition for female players from China, Japan, South Korea, Taiwan, Europe, North America, and Oceania. It was a 16-player knockout tournament. Games were played under Chinese rules with a 7.5 point komi. Each player had 2 hours of main time with five 60-second byoyomi periods.

From the 1st to the 3rd Bingsheng Cup, the winner received 200,000 RMB in prize money and the runner-up received 80,000 RMB. From the 4th to the 6th cup, the prizes were 250,000 RMB and 100,000 RMB, respectively. From the 7th cup to the 10th cup, the winner's prize was 300,000 RMB and the runner-up's prize remained 100,000 RMB.

== History ==
The Bingsheng Cup was first held in 2010. At the time of its creation, the Bingsheng Cup was the only international women's individual Go tournament. Other such tournaments had been held before, such as the Bohai Cup, but were discontinued or were one-off events. It remained the only one until the Wu Qingyuan Cup was established in 2018.

The 1st Bingsheng Cup winner was Park Jieun, and the runner-up was Joanne Missingham. Missingham, who was born in Australia and is a Taiwan Qiyuan professional player, represented Oceania in the tournament, achieving the best-ever international tournament result for a player born outside Asia.

Korean players won the title 7 times and Chinese players have won 3 times. Japan's best result was a semifinals appearance by Rina Fujisawa in 2019.

== Winners and runners-up ==
Edition	Year	Winner	Runner-up
1st	2010	(South Korea) Park Jieun	(Australia) Joanne Missingham
2nd	2011	(South Korea) Park Jieun	(China) Tang Yi
3rd	2012	(China) Li He	(China) Rui Naiwei
4th	2013	(China) Wang Chenxing	(China) Yu Zhiying
5th	2014	(South Korea) Choi Jeong	(China) Rui Naiwei
6th	2015	(China) Yu Zhiying	(South Korea) Park Jieun
7th	2016	(South Korea) Oh Yu-jin	(China) Wang Chenxing
8th	2017	(South Korea) Choi Jeong	(China) Wang Chenxing
9th	2018	(South Korea) Choi Jeong	(South Korea) Oh Yu-jin
10th	2019	(South Korea) Choi Jeong	(China) Zhou Hongyu
