= Go at the 2010 Asian Games – Mixed pair =

Mixed pair at the 2010 Asian Games
- Venue: Guangzhou Chess Institute
- Date: 20–22 November 2010
- Competitors: 34 from 10 nations

Medalists
| gold medal | Park Jeong-hwan; Lee Seul-a | South Korea |
| silver medal | Xie He; Song Ronghui | China |
| bronze medal | Choi Cheol-han; Kim Yoon-yeong | South Korea |

The mixed pair competition at the 2010 Asian Games in Guangzhou, China was held from 20 November to 22 November at the Guangzhou Chess Institute. The time was one hour (45 minutes in preliminary round) for each side and 30 seconds byoyomi for three times.

In the preliminary round, the tie-breaking system was the sum of opponents' scores (SOS), but if a second-level tie break was needed, the first-round opponents' scores were subtracted from the SOS scores.

== Schedule ==
All times are China Standard Time (UTC+08:00)

| Date | Time | Event |
|---|---|---|
| Saturday, 20 November 2010 | 09:30 | Round 1 |
| Saturday, 20 November 2010 | 13:00 | Round 2 |
| Saturday, 20 November 2010 | 16:30 | Round 3 |
| Sunday, 21 November 2010 | 09:30 | Round 4 |
| Sunday, 21 November 2010 | 13:00 | Round 5 |
| Sunday, 21 November 2010 | 16:30 | Round 6 |
| Monday, 22 November 2010 | 09:30 | Semifinals |
| Monday, 22 November 2010 | 15:00 | Finals |

== Results ==
=== Preliminary round ===
==== Round 1 ====
| Black | Score | White |
|---|---|---|
| Xie He (CHN); Song Ronghui (CHN) | 2–0 | Đỗ Khánh Bình (VIE); Phạm Thị Kim Long (VIE) |
| Ri Kwang-hyok (PRK); Kim Yu-mi (PRK) | 0–2 | Liu Xing (CHN); Tang Yi (CHN) |
| Cho U (TPE); Hsieh Yi-min (TPE) | 2–0 | Zaid Zulkifli (MAS); Fong Sok Nee (MAS) |
| Pak ho-gil (PRK); Jo Sae-byol (PRK) | 2–0 | Shinji Takao (JPN); Chiaki Mukai (JPN) |
| Park Jeong-hwan (KOR); Lee Seul-a (KOR) | 2–0 | Apidet Jirasophin (THA); Waraphan Nawaruk (THA) |
| Tsolmongiin Sansar (MGL); Ravjiryn Tungalag (MGL) | 0–2 | Choi Cheol-han (KOR); Kim Yoon-yeong (KOR) |
| Satoshi Yuki (JPN); Ayumi Suzuki (JPN) | 2–0 | Nuttakrit Taechaamnuayvit (THA); Pattraporn Aroonphaichitra (THA) |
| Chan Nai San (HKG); Wong Lok Ying (HKG) | 0–2 | Chou Chun-hsun (TPE); Joanne Missingham (TPE) |
| Yang Shi Hai (HKG); Kan Ying (HKG) | 2–0 | Bye |

==== Round 2 ====
| Black | Score | White |
|---|---|---|
| Chou Chun-hsun (TPE); Joanne Missingham (TPE) | 2–0 | Yang Shi Hai (HKG); Kan Ying (HKG) |
| Choi Cheol-han (KOR); Kim Yoon-yeong (KOR) | 2–0 | Satoshi Yuki (JPN); Ayumi Suzuki (JPN) |
| Liu Xing (CHN); Tang Yi (CHN) | 2–0 | Park Jeong-hwan (KOR); Lee Seul-a (KOR) |
| Pak ho-gil (PRK); Jo Sae-byol (PRK) | 2–0 | Cho U (TPE); Hsieh Yi-min (TPE) |
| Nuttakrit Taechaamnuayvit (THA); Pattraporn Aroonphaichitra (THA) | 0–2 | Xie He (CHN); Song Ronghui (CHN) |
| Apidet Jirasophin (THA); Waraphan Nawaruk (THA) | 0–2 | Chan Nai San (HKG); Wong Lok Ying (HKG) |
| Shinji Takao (JPN); Chiaki Mukai (JPN) | 2–0 | Tsolmongiin Sansar (MGL); Ravjiryn Tungalag (MGL) |
| Zaid Zulkifli (MAS); Fong Sok Nee (MAS) | 0–2 | Ri Kwang-hyok (PRK); Kim Yu-mi (PRK) |
| Bye | 0–2 | Đỗ Khánh Bình (VIE); Phạm Thị Kim Long (VIE) |

==== Round 3 ====
| Black | Score | White |
|---|---|---|
| Xie He (CHN); Song Ronghui (CHN) | 2–0 | Liu Xing (CHN); Tang Yi (CHN) |
| Choi Cheol-han (KOR); Kim Yoon-yeong (KOR) | 2–0 | Pak ho-gil (PRK); Jo Sae-byol (PRK) |
| Đỗ Khánh Bình (VIE); Phạm Thị Kim Long (VIE) | 0–2 | Chou Chun-hsun (TPE); Joanne Missingham (TPE) |
| Ri Kwang-hyok (PRK); Kim Yu-mi (PRK) | 0–2 | Cho U (TPE); Hsieh Yi-min (TPE) |
| Shinji Takao (JPN); Chiaki Mukai (JPN) | 0–2 | Park Jeong-hwan (KOR); Lee Seul-a (KOR) |
| Satoshi Yuki (JPN); Ayumi Suzuki (JPN) | 2–0 | Chan Nai San (HKG); Wong Lok Ying (HKG) |
| Zaid Zulkifli (MAS); Fong Sok Nee (MAS) | 0–2 | Yang Shi Hai (HKG); Kan Ying (HKG) |
| Apidet Jirasophin (THA); Waraphan Nawaruk (THA) | 0–2 | Tsolmongiin Sansar (MGL); Ravjiryn Tungalag (MGL) |
| Nuttakrit Taechaamnuayvit (THA); Pattraporn Aroonphaichitra (THA) | 2–0 | Bye |

==== Round 4 ====
| Black | Score | White |
|---|---|---|
| Chou Chun-hsun (TPE); Joanne Missingham (TPE) | 2–0 | Xie He (CHN); Song Ronghui (CHN) |
| Yang Shi Hai (HKG); Kan Ying (HKG) | 0–2 | Choi Cheol-han (KOR); Kim Yoon-yeong (KOR) |
| Park Jeong-hwan (KOR); Lee Seul-a (KOR) | 2–0 | Satoshi Yuki (JPN); Ayumi Suzuki (JPN) |
| Liu Xing (CHN); Tang Yi (CHN) | 0–2 | Pak ho-gil (PRK); Jo Sae-byol (PRK) |
| Cho U (TPE); Hsieh Yi-min (TPE) | 2–0 | Shinji Takao (JPN); Chiaki Mukai (JPN) |
| Chan Nai San (HKG); Wong Lok Ying (HKG) | 2–0 | Nuttakrit Taechaamnuayvit (THA); Pattraporn Aroonphaichitra (THA) |
| Tsolmongiin Sansar (MGL); Ravjiryn Tungalag (MGL) | 0–2 | Ri Kwang-hyok (PRK); Kim Yu-mi (PRK) |
| Đỗ Khánh Bình (VIE); Phạm Thị Kim Long (VIE) | 2–0 | Apidet Jirasophin (THA); Waraphan Nawaruk (THA) |
| Bye | 0–2 | Zaid Zulkifli (MAS); Fong Sok Nee (MAS) |

==== Round 5 ====
| Black | Score | White |
|---|---|---|
| Choi Cheol-han (KOR); Kim Yoon-yeong (KOR) | 0–2 | Chou Chun-hsun (TPE); Joanne Missingham (TPE) |
| Xie He (CHN); Song Ronghui (CHN) | 0–2 | Cho U (TPE); Hsieh Yi-min (TPE) |
| Pak ho-gil (PRK); Jo Sae-byol (PRK) | 0–2 | Park Jeong-hwan (KOR); Lee Seul-a (KOR) |
| Đỗ Khánh Bình (VIE); Phạm Thị Kim Long (VIE) | 0–2 | Ri Kwang-hyok (PRK); Kim Yu-mi (PRK) |
| Liu Xing (CHN); Tang Yi (CHN) | 2–0 | Satoshi Yuki (JPN); Ayumi Suzuki (JPN) |
| Chan Nai San (HKG); Wong Lok Ying (HKG) | 0–2 | Yang Shi Hai (HKG); Kan Ying (HKG) |
| Zaid Zulkifli (MAS); Fong Sok Nee (MAS) | 0–2 | Shinji Takao (JPN); Chiaki Mukai (JPN) |
| Tsolmongiin Sansar (MGL); Ravjiryn Tungalag (MGL) | 0–2 | Nuttakrit Taechaamnuayvit (THA); Pattraporn Aroonphaichitra (THA) |
| Apidet Jirasophin (THA); Waraphan Nawaruk (THA) | 2–0 | Bye |

==== Round 6 ====
| Black | Score | White |
|---|---|---|
| Chou Chun-hsun (TPE); Joanne Missingham (TPE) | 0–2 | Park Jeong-hwan (KOR); Lee Seul-a (KOR) |
| Cho U (TPE); Hsieh Yi-min (TPE) | 0–2 | Choi Cheol-han (KOR); Kim Yoon-yeong (KOR) |
| Yang Shi Hai (HKG); Kan Ying (HKG) | 2–0 | Pak ho-gil (PRK); Jo Sae-byol (PRK) |
| Ri Kwang-hyok (PRK); Kim Yu-mi (PRK) | 0–2 | Xie He (CHN); Song Ronghui (CHN) |
| Nuttakrit Taechaamnuayvit (THA); Pattraporn Aroonphaichitra (THA) | 0–2 | Liu Xing (CHN); Tang Yi (CHN) |
| Shinji Takao (JPN); Chiaki Mukai (JPN) | 2–0 | Chan Nai San (HKG); Wong Lok Ying (HKG) |
| Satoshi Yuki (JPN); Ayumi Suzuki (JPN) | 2–0 | Đỗ Khánh Bình (VIE); Phạm Thị Kim Long (VIE) |
| Apidet Jirasophin (THA); Waraphan Nawaruk (THA) | 2–0 | Zaid Zulkifli (MAS); Fong Sok Nee (MAS) |
| Bye | 0–2 | Tsolmongiin Sansar (MGL); Ravjiryn Tungalag (MGL) |

==== Summary ====
| Rank | Team | Round | | | | | | Total | SOS |
| Rank | Team | 1 | 2 | 3 | 4 | 5 | 6 | Total | SOS |
|---|---|---|---|---|---|---|---|---|---|
| 1 | Chou Chun-hsun (TPE); Joanne Missingham (TPE) | 2 | 2 | 2 | 2 | 2 | 0 | 10 | 44 |
| 2 | Choi Cheol-han (KOR); Kim Yoon-yeong (KOR) | 2 | 2 | 2 | 2 | 0 | 2 | 10 | 42 |
| 3 | Park Jeong-hwan (KOR); Lee Seul-a (KOR) | 2 | 0 | 2 | 2 | 2 | 2 | 10 | 40 |
| 4 | Xie He (CHN); Song Ronghui (CHN) | 2 | 2 | 2 | 0 | 0 | 2 | 8 | 40_{36} |
| 5 | Liu Xing (CHN); Tang Yi (CHN) | 2 | 2 | 0 | 0 | 2 | 2 | 8 | 40_{34} |
| 6 | Cho U (TPE); Hsieh Yi-min (TPE) | 2 | 0 | 2 | 2 | 2 | 0 | 8 | 38 |
| 7 | Yang Shi Hai (HKG); Kan Ying (HKG) | 2 | 0 | 2 | 0 | 2 | 2 | 8 | 32 |
| 8 | Pak ho-gil (PRK); Jo Sae-byol (PRK) | 2 | 2 | 0 | 2 | 0 | 0 | 6 | 50 |
| 9 | Satoshi Yuki (JPN); Ayumi Suzuki (JPN) | 2 | 0 | 2 | 0 | 0 | 2 | 6 | 40 |
| 10 | Shinji Takao (JPN); Chiaki Mukai (JPN) | 0 | 2 | 0 | 0 | 2 | 2 | 6 | 34_{28} |
| 11 | Ri Kwang-hyok (PRK); Kim Yu-mi (PRK) | 0 | 2 | 0 | 2 | 2 | 0 | 6 | 34_{26} |
| 12 | Chan Nai San (HKG); Wong Lok Ying (HKG) | 0 | 2 | 0 | 2 | 0 | 0 | 4 | 38 |
| 13 | Đỗ Khánh Bình (VIE); Phạm Thị Kim Long (VIE) | 0 | 2 | 0 | 2 | 0 | 0 | 4 | 34 |
| 14 | Nuttakrit Taechaamnuayvit (THA); Pattraporn Aroonphaichitra (THA) | 0 | 0 | 2 | 0 | 2 | 0 | 4 | 30_{24} |
| 15 | Tsolmongiin Sansar (MGL); Ravjiryn Tungalag (MGL) | 0 | 0 | 2 | 0 | 0 | 2 | 4 | 30_{20} |
| 16 | Apidet Jirasophin (THA); Waraphan Nawaruk (THA) | 0 | 0 | 0 | 0 | 2 | 2 | 4 | 24 |
| 17 | Zaid Zulkifli (MAS); Fong Sok Nee (MAS) | 0 | 0 | 0 | 2 | 0 | 0 | 2 | 32 |

=== Knockout round ===
Semifinals
1 | Chou Chun-hsun (TPE); Joanne Missingham (TPE) | 0
4 | Xie He (CHN); Song Ronghui (CHN) | 2
2 | Choi Cheol-han (KOR); Kim Yoon-yeong (KOR) | 0
3 | Park Jeong-hwan (KOR); Lee Seul-a (KOR) | 2

Gold medal match
4 | Xie He (CHN); Song Ronghui (CHN) | 0
3 | Park Jeong-hwan (KOR); Lee Seul-a (KOR) | 2
Bronze medal match
1 | Chou Chun-hsun (TPE); Joanne Missingham (TPE) | 0
2 | Choi Cheol-han (KOR); Kim Yoon-yeong (KOR) | 2

==== Semifinals ====
| Black | Score | White |
|---|---|---|
| Xie He (CHN); Song Ronghui (CHN) | 2–0 | Chou Chun-hsun (TPE); Joanne Missingham (TPE) |
| Choi Cheol-han (KOR); Kim Yoon-yeong (KOR) | 0–2 | Park Jeong-hwan (KOR); Lee Seul-a (KOR) |

==== Bronze medal match ====
| Black | Score | White |
|---|---|---|
| Choi Cheol-han (KOR); Kim Yoon-yeong (KOR) | 2–0 | Chou Chun-hsun (TPE); Joanne Missingham (TPE) |

==== Gold medal match ====
| Black | Score | White |
|---|---|---|
| Park Jeong-hwan (KOR); Lee Seul-a (KOR) | 2–0 | Xie He (CHN); Song Ronghui (CHN) |
