= Women's Honinbo =

Japanese Go tournament

The Women's Honinbo (女流本因坊戦, Joryū Hon'inbō-sen) is a Japanese Go competition.

== Outline ==
The Women's Honinbo is the female version of the Honinbo. It is sponsored by the Kyodo News Agency and Sompo Japan Insurance. The winner's purse is 5,500,000 yen.

== Past winners ==
Winners in chronological order:

Women's Honinbo
	Year	Winner	Score	Runner-up
1.	1982	Honda Sachiko	2–1	Kobayashi Reiko
2.	1983	Kusunoki Teruko	2–1	Honda Sachiko
3.	1984	Honda Sachiko	2–0	Kusunoki Teruko
4.	1985	Kusunoki Teruko	2–1	Honda Sachiko
5.	1986	Ogawa Tomoko	2–0	Kusunoki Teruko
6.	1987	Kusunoki Teruko	2–1	Ogawa Tomoko
7.	1988	Kusunoki Teruko	2–0	Ogawa Tomoko
8.	1989	Kusunoki Teruko	2–0	Ogawa Tomoko
9.	1990	Nakazawa Ayako	2–1	Kusunoki Teruko
10.	1991	Nakazawa Ayako	2–1	Kobayashi Chizu
11.	1992	Kato Tomoko	2–0	Nakazawa Ayako
12.	1993	Yoshida Mika	2–1	Kato Tomoko
13.	1994	Yoshida Mika	2–0	Tsukuda Akiko
14.	1995	Yoshida Mika	3–1	Chinen Kaori
15.	1996	Yoshida Mika	3–0	Nakazawa Ayako
16.	1997	Chinen Kaori	3–1	Yoshida Mika
17.	1998	Chinen Kaori	3–0	Kato Tomoko
18.	1999	Chinen Kaori	3–1	Kobayashi Izumi
19.	2000	Inori Yoko	3–2	Chinen Kaori
20.	2001	Kobayashi Izumi	3–1	Inori Yoko
21.	2002	Kobayashi Izumi	3–2	Chinen Kaori
22.	2003	Kobayashi Izumi	3–1	Yashiro Kumiko
23.	2004	Chinen Kaori	3–1	Kobayashi Izumi
24.	2005	Yashiro Kumiko	3–0	Chinen Kaori
25.	2006	Yashiro Kumiko	3–1	Inori Yoko
26.	2007	Xie Yimin	3–1	Yashiro Kumiko
27.	2008	Xie Yimin	3–1	Suzuki Ayumi
28.	2009	Xie Yimin	3–1	Aoki Kikuyo
29.	2010	Xie Yimin	3–0	Mukai Chiaki
30.	2011	Xie Yimin	3–1	Mukai Chiaki
31.	2012	Xie Yimin	3–0	Okuda Aya
32.	2013	Mukai Chiaki	3–2	Xie Yimin
33.	2014	Fujisawa Rina	3–0	Mukai Chiaki
34.	2015	Xie Yimin	3–2	Fujisawa Rina
35.	2016	Fujisawa Rina	3–1	Xie Yimin
36.	2017	Xie Yimin	3–2	Fujisawa Rina
37.	2018	Fujisawa Rina	3–1	Xie Yimin
38.	2019	Ueno Asami	3–1	Fujisawa Rina
39.	2020	Fujisawa Rina	3–2	Ueno Asami
40.	2021	Fujisawa Rina	3–0	Hoshiai Shiho
41.	2022	Fujisawa Rina	3–0	Ueno Asami
42.	2023	Fujisawa Rina	3–2	Ueno Risa
43.	2024	Fujisawa Rina	3–2	Nyu Eiko
44.	2025	Fujisawa Rina	3–2	Hoshiai Shiho

Winners by number of titles:

Player	Titles	Years Held
Fujisawa Rina	9	2014, 2016, 2018, 2020–2025
Xie Yimin	8	2007–2012, 2015, 2017
Kusunoki Teruko	5	1983, 1985, 1987–1989
Yoshida Mika	4	1993–1996
Chinen Kaori	4	1997–1999, 2004
Kobayashi Izumi	3	2001–2003
Honda Sachiko	2	1982, 1984
Nakazawa Ayako	2	1990–1991
Yashiro Kumiko	2	2005–2006
Ogawa Tomoko	1	1986
Kato Tomoko	1	1992
Inori Yoko	1	2000
Mukai Chiaki	1	2013
Ueno Asami	1	2019
