= Aizu Central Hospital Cup =

Go competition

The Women's Hollyhock Cup (女流立葵杯, Joryû Tachi-aoi hai), formerly known as Aizu Central Hospital Cup (会津中央病院杯, Aizu Chûô Byôin-hai) before 2017, is a Go competition for female Go players. The tournament was introduced in 2014.

== Outline ==
The Hollyhock Cup is sponsored by the Aizu Central Hospital, a hospital in Aizuwakamatsu City in Fukushima Prefecture, and named after the city flower, the common hollyhock (Althaea rosea). The director of the hospital is a keen go player, and in an interview he said that at one time 20 of the doctors on the staff were go players who often held their own tournaments. His aim in sponsoring the tournament is to help raise the level of Japanese women so that they can compete better internationally. The winner's purse is 7,000,000 yen ($60,000). The first three cycles used one final game over the course of two days. Starting from the fourth cycle, the final is a three-games match. Starting from the fifth cycle, a challenger system is set to be implemented, meaning the winner of the previous cycle will play in a title series against the challenger.

== Past winners ==
	Year	Winner	Score	Runner-Up
1.	2014	Fujisawa Rina	1–0	Okuda Aya
2.	2015	Ô Keii	1–0	Hsieh Yi-min
3.	2016	Hsieh Yi-min	1–0	Aoki Kikuyo
4.	2017	Fujisawa Rina	2–1	Hsieh Yi-min
5.	2018	Fujisawa Rina	2–1	Hsieh Yi-min
6.	2019	Fujisawa Rina	2–0	Asami Ueno
7.	2020	Fujisawa Rina	2–0	Suzuki Ayumi
8.	2021	Fujisawa Rina	2–0	Asami Ueno
9.	2022	Asami Ueno	2–1	Fujisawa Rina
10.	2023	Asami Ueno	2–1	Fujisawa Rina
11.	2024	Asami Ueno	2–0	Mukai Chiaki
12.	2025	Asami Ueno	2–1	Fujisawa Rina
