= Hajin (disambiguation) =

Hajin may refer to:

- Hajin, a city in eastern Syria, administratively part of the Deir ez-Zor Governorate, located along the Euphrates River, south of Deir ez-Zor
- Hajin, Iran, a village in Mashiz Rural District, in the Central District of Bardsir County, Kerman Province, Iran
- Haçin now known as Saimbeyli, a small city and a district in Adana Province, Turkey in the Çukurova region
- Nor Hachn or Nor Hajin (meaning New Hajin), a town and urban municipal community in the Kotayk Province of Armenia, founded in 1953 based on the name of the Haçin city in Turkey

== Others ==
- Hajin Lee, or Lee Ha-jin (born 1988), a South Korean professional Go player
