= Wakagoi Cup =

Japanese Go competition

The Wakagoi or Young Carp is a Go competition in Japan for players 30 years of age or younger and at most 7 dan in rank.

Its full name is Hiroshima Aluminum Cup Young Carp Tournament (広島アルミ杯・若鯉戦, Hiroshima arumi-hai wakagoi-sen), named after the sponsor Hiroshima Aluminum Industry Co., Ltd.

The tournament was founded in 2006 and is held annually. It was considered a local unofficial tournament in its first five years, before becoming an official tournament in 2011. The maximum rank for eligible players was 5 dan from 2006 to 2010, 6 dan until 2014, and the current 7 dan since 2015.

The winner's prize is ¥3,000,000 (formerly ¥2,000,000 from 2006 to 2014).

== Past winners and runners-up ==
Young Carp
	Year	Winner	Runner-up
1.	2006	Hsieh Yimin	Lee Ishu
2.	2007	Shida Tatsuya	Mitani Tetsuya
3.	2008	Mitani Tetsuya	Anzai Nobuaki
4.	2009	Uchida Shuhei	Yamamori Tadanao
5.	2010	Terayama Rei	Yamamoto Kentaro
6.	2011	Uchida Shuhei	Shida Tatsuya
7.	2012	Shinji Suzuki	Ichiriki Ryo
8.	2013	Ichiriki Ryo	Fujita Akihiko
9.	2014	Motoki Katsuya	Mutsuura Yuta
10.	2015	Terayama Rei	Shida Tatsuya
11.	2016	Ichiriki Ryo	Motoki Katsuya
12.	2017	Li Yi-hsiu	Yao Zhiteng
13.	2018	Fujita Akihiko	Koike Yoshihiro
14.	2019	Hirata Tomoya	Mutsuura Yuta
15.	2020	Fujisawa Rina	Sun Zhe
16.	2021	Ueno Asami	Nishi Takenobu
17.	2022	Ueno Asami	Koike Yoshihiro
18.	2023	Hirose Yuichi	Koike Yoshihiro
19.	2024	Yokotsuka Riki	Hirose Yuichi
20.	2025	Onishi Ryuhei	Yokotsuka Riki
