= Female Myungin =

South Korean Go competition

The Female Myungin (Korean: 여류명인전, Hanja: 女流名人戰) was a Go competition in South Korea. Begun in 1999, it was held 17 times and was discontinued after 2016. The word of myungin in Korean language, literally meaning "Brilliant Man", is same as meijin in Japanese and as mingren in Chinese.

== Past winners and runners-up ==
No.	Year	Winner	Score	Runner-up
1	2000	Park Jieun	2–1	Lee Young-shin
2	2001	Rui Naiwei	2–1	Park Jieun
3	2002	Rui Naiwei	2–0	Hyun Mi-jin
4	2003	Rui Naiwei	2–0	Cho Hye-yeon
5	2004	Cho Hye-yeon	2–0	Rui Naiwei
6	2005	Rui Naiwei	2–0	Cho Hye-yeon
7	2006	Rui Naiwei	2–1	Cho Hye-yeon
8	2007	Rui Naiwei	2–0	Lee Da-hye
9	2008	Rui Naiwei	2–0	Cho Hye-yeon
10	2009	Rui Naiwei	2–1	Cho Hye-yeon
11	2010	Rui Naiwei	2–1	Cho Hye-yeon
12	2011	Rui Naiwei	2–1	Cho Hye-yeon
13	2012	Choi Jeong	2–0	Kim Mi-ri
14	2013	Choi Jeong	2–1	Park Ji-yeon
15	2014	Choi Jeong	2–1	Park Ji-yeon
16	2015	Choi Jeong	2–0	Oh Yu-jin
17	2016	Choi Jeong	2–0	Oh Yu-jin
