= Sachiko Honda =

Japanese Go player (1930–2020)

Sachiko Honda (Japanese: 本田幸子, December 30, 1930 – May 1, 2020) was a 8-dan professional go player at the Japanese Go Association. She was the inaugural winner of the Women's Honinbo in 1982, the runner-up in 1983 and 1985, and the winner in 1984.

== Biography ==
Honda was born in 1930 in Shizuoka Prefecture and began training with Minoru Kitani in 1938. Her two sisters, Kazuko Sugiuchi (8-dan), the mentor of Tomoko Kato, and Teruko Kusunoki (8-dan), both became professional go players – they were known as the Three Honda Sisters (本田３姉妹). The sisters competed against each other for titles a number of times, later publishing a book in 1983 about their shared experiences.

In 1947, she qualified as a professional, reaching 1-dan. She reached 3-dan in 1958 and 4-dan in 1963. In 1969, she defeated Reiko Kobayashi, the daughter of Minoru Kitani, 2–1 in the women's championship and claimed her first title. At the first Women's Honinbo in 1982, she again faced Kobayashi and successfully defended her title.

Honda travelled internationally in the promotion of go from early on in her professional career. In 1952, she visited Taiwan with Go Seigen. In 1961, she was selected to visit the US as part of the Japan-US Friendship Go Envoy with her sister Teruko and Reiko Kobayashi, which included playing exhibition games at Princeton University in Fine Hall against Princeton residents. They also visited the Seattle home of the American go player Heidi Kirschner and held teaching sessions for local go players in the 1960s when the American go community outside of New York and San Francisco was in its nascent stage. In 1974, she and Chizu Kobayashi, sister of Satoru Kobayashi, visited Paris for simultaneous games for the first go tour in France.

Honda retired in 2000 and was promoted to 7-dan. By her retirement, she had won seven titles. She won the Kishichiro Okura Prize in 2004. In 2020, at the age of 89, she died of dementia in Tokyo. After her death, she was awarded 8-dan.

Her pupils include: Yoichi Yoshida (6-dan) and the three Mukai sisters, Chiaki Mukai (6-dan), Kozue (née Mukai) Nagashima (3-dan), and Kaori (née Mukai) Mimura (3-dan).
