= Women's Kisei =

Japanese Go competition

The Women's Kisei (女流棋聖戦, Joryū Kisei-sen) is a Japanese Go competition.

== Outline ==
The Women's Kisei is sponsored by NTT DoCoMo, and uses a hayago format, of 30 seconds per move and a 10x1 minute byo-yomi, unlike the Kisei, which uses an eight-hour thinking time format. The winner's purse is 5,000,000 yen.

== Past winners ==
Winners in chronological order:

	Year	Winner	Score	Runner-up
1.	1998	Kobayashi Izumi	2–0	Kobayashi Chizu
2.	1999	Kobayashi Izumi	2–1	Sugiuchi Kazuko
3.	2000	Chinen Kaori	2–0	Kobayashi Izumi
4.	2001	Chinen Kaori	2–1	Kato Reiko
5.	2002	Chinen Kaori	2–1	Ogawa Tomoko
6.	2003	Chinen Kaori	2–1	Kato Reiko
7.	2004	Mannami Kana	2–1	Chinen Kaori
8.	2005	Chinen Kaori	2–0	Mannami Kana
9.	2006	Mannami Kana	2–1	Chinen Kaori
10.	2007	Umezawa Yukari	2–1	Mannami Kana
11.	2008	Umezawa Yukari	2–0	Mukai Chiaki
12.	2009	Umezawa Yukari	2–1	Kato Reiko
13.	2010	Xie Yimin	2–0	Umezawa Yukari
14.	2011	Xie Yimin	2–0	Umezawa Yukari
15.	2012	Aoki Kikuyo	2–1	Xie Yimin
16.	2013	Xie Yimin	2–0	Aoki Kikuyo
17.	2014	Xie Yimin	2–0	Aoki Kikuyo
18.	2015	Xie Yimin	2–0	Konishi Kazuko
19.	2016	Xie Yimin	2–0	Yoshihara (nee Umezawa) Yukari
20.	2017	Xie Yimin	2–1	Nyu Eiko
21.	2018	Ueno Asami	2–0	Xie Yimin
22.	2019	Ueno Asami	2–0	Fujisawa Rina
23.	2020	Suzuki Ayumi	2–0	Ueno Asami
24.	2021	Ueno Asami	2–1	Suzuki Ayumi
25.	2022	Ueno Asami	2–0	Suzuki Ayumi
26.	2023	Nakamura Sumire	2–1	Ueno Asami
27.	2024	Ueno Risa	2–1	Nakamura Sumire
28.	2025	Ueno Risa	2–0	Mukai Chiaki
29.	2026	Ueno Asami	2–0	Ueno Risa

Winners by number of titles:

Player	Titles	Years Held
Xie Yimin	7	2010–2011, 2013–2017
Chinen Kaori	5	2000–2003, 2005
Ueno Asami	5	2018–2019, 2021–2022, 2026
Yoshihara Yukari	3	2007–2009
Kobayashi Izumi	2	1998–1999
Mannami Kana	2	2004, 2006
Ueno Risa	2	2024–2025
Aoki Kikuyo	1	2012
Suzuki Ayumi	1	2020
Nakamura Sumire	1	2023
