= Reiko Kobayashi (Go player) =

Japanese Go player

Personal information
- Native name: 小林禮子 (Japanese)
- Full name: Reiko Kobayashi
- Born: December 23, 1939
- Died: April 16, 1996 (aged 56)

Sport
- Teacher: Minoru Kitani
- Rank: 7 dan
- Affiliation: Nihon Ki-in

Reiko Kobayashi (小林 禮子, Kobayashi Reiko; 1939–1996), formerly Reiko Kitani (木谷 禮子, Kitani Reiko), was a Japanese female 7-dan professional Go player at Nihon Ki-in.

== Achievements ==
Year	Notes
1973 and 1975	Obtained the Women's Meijin (女流名人)
1967, 1968, 1970, 1980 and 1982	Received the female MVP (棋道賞女流賞)

== Notable family members ==
Reiko Kobayashi has several professional players in her family.

Minoru Kitani, 9-dan professional go player
Reiko Kobayashi	Koichi Kobayashi, 9-dan professional go player Holder of three honorary titles
Izumi Kobayashi; Former female title holder	Cho U, 9-dan professional player

- Father: Minoru Kitani, 9-dan professional go player
- Husband: Koichi Kobayashi, 9-dan professional go player, holder of three honorary titles
- Daughter: Izumi Kobayashi, former female title holder
- Son in law: Cho U, 9-dan professional player from Taiwan

== Personal life ==
Reiko Kitani was trained by her father Minoru Kitani, and eventually married one of his best students, Koichi Kobayashi, who was 13 years younger. They had one daughter Izumi Kobayashi. Reiko Kobayashi died after an 18-month battle with cancer.
