= Go at the 2022 Asian Games – Women's team =

Go competition at the 2022 Asian Games

Women's team at the 2022 Asian Games
- Venue: Hangzhou Chess Academy
- Date: 29 September – 3 October 2023
- Competitors: 30 from 8 nations

Medalists
gold medal	China; Wu Yiming, Yu Zhiying, Li He, Wang Yubo
silver medal	South Korea; Kim Eun-ji, Oh Yu-jin, Choi Jeong, Kim Chae-young
bronze medal	Japan; Asami Ueno, Risa Ueno, Rina Fujisawa

The women's team competition at the 2022 Asian Games in Hangzhou, China was held from 29 September to 3 October 2023 at Hangzhou Chess Academy. Each player had one hour and 30 seconds byoyomi periods.

== Schedule ==
All times are China Standard Time (UTC+08:00)

Date	Time	Event
Friday, 29 September 2023	09:30	Round 1
Friday, 29 September 2023	15:00	Round 2
Saturday, 30 September 2023	09:30	Round 3
Saturday, 30 September 2023	15:00	Round 4
Sunday, 1 October 2023	09:30	Round 5
Monday, 2 October 2023	09:30	Semifinals
Monday, 2 October 2023	15:00	Bronze medal match
Tuesday, 3 October 2023	09:30	Gold medal match

== Results ==
=== Preliminary round ===
==== Round 1 ====
	Score	
Japan	6–0	Thailand
Asami Ueno	2–0	Pinyada Sornarra
Risa Ueno	2–0	Nathanich Chantharojwong
Rina Fujisawa	2–0	Waranphat Bhornavalai
Chinese Taipei	0–6	South Korea
Lu Yu-hua	0–2	Kim Eun-ji
Yang Tzu-hsuan	0–2	Choi Jeong
Joanne Missingham	0–2	Kim Chae-young
Malaysia	0–6	Hong Kong
Chang Xin	0–2	Kan Ying
Yong Qing	0–2	Liu Yuxin
Tan Yan Ying	0–2	Lee Lok Yi
Mongolia	0–6	China
Gantulgyn Shinetuyaa	0–2	Wu Yiming
Gungaanyamyn Nomin-Erdene	0–2	Yu Zhiying
Otgonmaagiin Dechmaa	0–2	Wang Yubo

==== Round 2 ====
	Score	
China	4–2	Japan
Wu Yiming	2–0	Asami Ueno
Yu Zhiying	2–0	Risa Ueno
Li He	0–2	Rina Fujisawa
Hong Kong	0–6	South Korea
Kan Ying	0–2	Kim Eun-ji
Liu Yuxin	0–2	Oh Yu-jin
Lee Lok Yi	0–2	Kim Chae-young
Thailand	6–0	Mongolia
Pinyada Sornarra	2–0	Gantulgyn Shinetuyaa
Waranphat Bhornavalai	2–0	Gungaanyamyn Nomin-Erdene
Weerin Tanpisuth	2–0	Otgonmaagiin Dechmaa
Malaysia	0–6	Chinese Taipei
Yong Qing	0–2	Lu Yu-hua
Tan Yan Ying	0–2	Yang Tzu-hsuan
Tan Hooi Yan	0–2	Li Chia-hsing

==== Round 3 ====
	Score	
South Korea	4–2	China
Kim Eun-ji	0–2	Wu Yiming
Oh Yu-jin	2–0	Yu Zhiying
Choi Jeong	2–0	Li He
Japan	6–0	Chinese Taipei
Asami Ueno	2–0	Lu Yu-hua
Risa Ueno	2–0	Yang Tzu-hsuan
Rina Fujisawa	2–0	Joanne Missingham
Thailand	2–4	Hong Kong
Pinyada Sornarra	0–2	Kan Ying
Nathanich Chantharojwong	0–2	Liu Yuxin
Waranphat Bhornavalai	2–0	Yang Sin Ki
Mongolia	0–6	Malaysia
Gantulgyn Shinetuyaa	0–2	Chang Xin
Gungaanyamyn Nomin-Erdene	0–2	Yong Qing
Otgonmaagiin Dechmaa	0–2	Tan Yan Ying

==== Round 4 ====
	Score	
South Korea	4–2	Japan
Kim Eun-ji	0–2	Asami Ueno
Oh Yu-jin	2–0	Risa Ueno
Choi Jeong	2–0	Rina Fujisawa
China	6–0	Hong Kong
Wu Yiming	2–0	Kan Ying
Li He	2–0	Liu Yuxin
Wang Yubo	2–0	Yang Sin Ki
Malaysia	2–4	Thailand
Chang Xin	0–2	Pinyada Sornarra
Yong Qing	0–2	Nathanich Chantharojwong
Tan Yan Ying	2–0	Weerin Tanpisuth
Chinese Taipei	6–0	Mongolia
Yang Tzu-hsuan	2–0	Gantulgyn Shinetuyaa
Joanne Missingham	2–0	Gungaanyamyn Nomin-Erdene
Li Chia-hsing	2–0	Otgonmaagiin Dechmaa

==== Round 5 ====
	Score	
Thailand	0–6	South Korea
Pinyada Sornarra	0–2	Kim Eun-ji
Nathanich Chantharojwong	0–2	Choi Jeong
Weerin Tanpisuth	0–2	Kim Chae-young
Chinese Taipei	2–4	China
Lu Yu-hua	0–2	Wu Yiming
Yang Tzu-hsuan	2–0	Yu Zhiying
Joanne Missingham	0–2	Li He
Japan	6–0	Malaysia
Asami Ueno	2–0	Chang Xin
Risa Ueno	2–0	Tan Yan Ying
Rina Fujisawa	2–0	Tan Hooi Yan
Hong Kong	6–0	Mongolia
Kan Ying	2–0	Gantulgyn Shinetuyaa
Liu Yuxin	2–0	Gungaanyamyn Nomin-Erdene
Lee Lok Yi	2–0	Otgonmaagiin Dechmaa

==== Summary ====
Rank	Team	Round					Total	GP
Rank	Team	1	2	3	4	5	Total	GP
1	South Korea (KOR)	2	2	2	2	2	10	26
2	China (CHN)	2	2	0	2	2	8	22
3	Japan (JPN)	2	0	2	0	2	6	22
4	Hong Kong (HKG)	2	0	2	0	2	6	16
5	Chinese Taipei (TPE)	0	2	0	2	0	4	14
6	Thailand (THA)	0	2	0	2	0	4	12
7	Malaysia (MAS)	0	0	2	0	0	2	8
8	Mongolia (MGL)	0	0	0	0	0	0	0

=== Knockout round ===
Semifinals
1	South Korea	6
4	Hong Kong	0
3	Japan	2
2	China	4

Gold medal match
1	South Korea	2
2	China	4
Bronze medal match
4	Hong Kong	0
3	Japan	6

==== Semifinals ====
	Score	
South Korea	6–0	Hong Kong
Kim Eun-ji	2–0	Kan Ying
Oh Yu-jin	2–0	Liu Yuxin
Kim Chae-young	2–0	Lee Lok Yi
Japan	2–4	China
Asami Ueno	2–0	Wu Yiming
Risa Ueno	0–2	Yu Zhiying
Rina Fujisawa	0–2	Li He

==== Bronze medal match ====
	Score	
Hong Kong	0–6	Japan
Kan Ying	0–2	Asami Ueno
Liu Yuxin	0–2	Risa Ueno
Lee Lok Yi	0–2	Rina Fujisawa

==== Gold medal match ====
	Score	
South Korea	2–4	China
Kim Eun-ji	0–2	Wu Yiming
Oh Yu-jin	2–0	Yu Zhiying
Choi Jeong	0–2	Li He
