= Yu Zhiying =

Chinese Go player (born 1997)

Yu Zhiying 於之莹
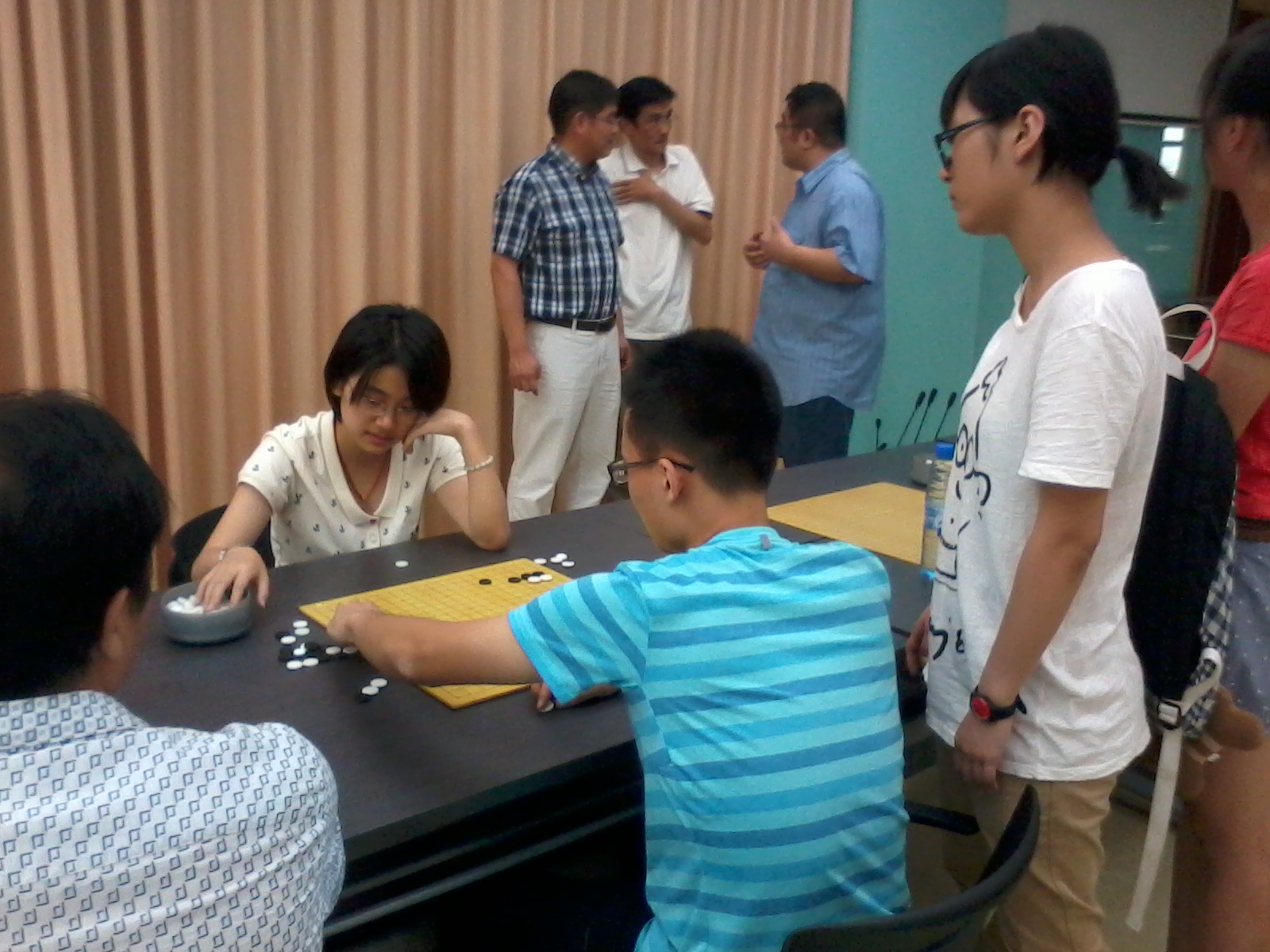
- Yu Zhiying c. 2014

Personal information
- Born: November 23, 1997 (age 28) Wuxi, Jiangsu, China

Sport
- Turned pro: 2010
- Rank: 8 dan
- Affiliation: Chinese Weiqi Association
Medal record
Women's Go
Representing China
Asian Games
Gold medal – first place	2022 Hangzhou	Women's team

Yu Zhiying
- Traditional Chinese: 於之瑩
- Simplified Chinese: 於之莹
Transcriptions
Standard Mandarin
- Hanyu Pinyin: Yū Zhīyíng

Yu Zhiying (Chinese: 於之莹; pinyin: Yū Zhīyíng; born 23 November 1997) is a Chinese professional go player.

In 2015 she won her first international, the 6th Bingsheng Cup.

== Promotion record ==
Rank	Year	Notes
1 dan	2010	Promoted to professional dan rank for performance in the Chinese professional qualification tournament.
2 dan	2011	Promoted for performance in the Chinese professional promotion tournament.
3 dan	2013	Skipped due to the Chinese Weiqi Association promotion rules.
4 dan	2013	Won 6 consecutive games in the 3rd Huang Longshi Cup.
5 dan	2014	Won the 6th Bingsheng Cup against Park Jieun.
6 dan	2017	Reached the final of the 1st Female Quzhou Lanke Cup.
7 dan	2021	
8 dan	2023	

== International competitions ==
Competitions	2011	2012	2013	2014	2015	2016	2017	2018	2019	2020	2021	2022	2023	2024	2025	2026
Samsung Cup	×	×	×	×	R16	×	×	×	×	×	×	R32	×	×	×	×
Mlily Cup	-		×	-	R32	-	×	-	R64	-			R16	-		R32
Bailing Cup	-	×	-	R64	-	R64	-	×	-							
Wu Qingyuan Cup	-							SF	R16	RU	RU	R16	QF	SF	QF	
Senko Cup	-							W	W	-	W	QF	×	3rd	×	×
Bingsheng Cup	QF	SF	RU	SF	W	SF	SF	×	QF	-						
Huanglongshi Cup	×	1:0	6:1	3:1	0:1	2:0	0:1	1:0	0:1	-				×	-	

(W) Winner; (RU) Runner-up; (SF) Semifinalist; (QF) Quarterfinalist; (R16) Round of 16; (R32) Round of 32; (R64) Round of 64; (RR) Round-robin.

- Note 1: Some competitions last for more than one year. In that case, the beginning year of the competition is recorded as the year of competition.
- Note 2: The light green background indicates that the player is still competing in the competition.
- Note 3: '×' means the player did not participate (or lost in the qualification round), while '-' means the competition was not held in that year.
- Note 4: The Senko Cup has a bronze medal match. Therefore, the semifinalists of Senko Cup are recorded '3rd' or '4th', while the semifinalists of the other international titles are recorded 'SF'.
- Note 5: The Huanglongshi Cup was a team competition until 2020, after which it switched to a round-robin format. The result is indicated as matches won : matches lost. The result '0:0' means the player qualified for her national team, and the team won before the player had the chance to compete in the cup.
