= Izumi Kobayashi =

Japanese Go player

Personal information
- Native name: 小林泉美 (Japanese)
- Full name: Izumi Kobayashi
- Born: June 20, 1977 (age 49) Tokyo, Japan

Sport
- Turned pro: 1995
- Teacher: Koichi Kobayashi
- Rank: 7 dan
- Affiliation: Nihon Ki-in

Izumi Kobayashi (小林 泉美, Kobayashi Izumi; born June 20, 1977) is a professional Go player.

== Biography ==
Izumi Kobayashi grew up in a family of accomplished Go players. She has joked that she first played Go in her mother's womb. Her father is Koichi Kobayashi, the man who ranks third in number of titles held in Japan. Her maternal grandfather was Kitani Minoru, one of the leading players and probably the greatest Go teacher. Her mother was Reiko Kobayashi née Kitani (1939–1996), 6 dan, who won the All-Japan Women's Championship several times. She became a professional go player in 1995, and was promoted to her current rank, 6 dan, in 2004. She is married to Cho U, one of the top players in Japan.

== Promotion record ==
Rank	Year	Notes
1 dan	1995	
2 dan	1997	
3 dan	1998	
4 dan	1999	
5 dan	2001	
6 dan	2004	
7 dan	2021	
8 dan		
9 dan		

== Titles & runners-up ==
Title	Years Held
Current	9
(Japan) Women's Honinbo	2001–2003
(Japan) Women's Meijin	2001, 2003, 2004
(Japan) Women's Kisei	1998, 1999
(Japan) Women's Saikyo	2005
Defunct	1
(Japan) Women's JAL Super Hayago	2004

Title	Years Lost
Current	6
(Japan) Women's Honinbo	1999, 2004
(Japan) Women's Meijin	2000, 2002, 2005
(Japan) Women's Kisei	2000
Defunct	3
(Japan) Women's Kakusei	1996, 1999, 2001
