= Kana Mannami =

Japanese Go player

Personal information
- Native name: 万波佳奈 (Japanese)
- Full name: Kana Mannami
- Born: June 16, 1983 (age 43) Hyōgo, Japan

Sport
- Turned pro: 2000
- Rank: 4 dan
- Affiliation: Nihon Ki-in

Kana Mannami (万波佳奈, Mannami Kana; born June 16, 1983) is a professional Go player.

== Biography ==
Mannami became a professional in 2000 at the age of seventeen, and four years later, she won the Women's Kisei title. She was promoted to 4 dan in 2007.

== Promotion record ==
Rank	Year	Notes
1 dan	2000	
2 dan		
3 dan	2004	
4 dan	2007	
5 dan		
6 dan		
7 dan		
8 dan		
9 dan		

== Titles & runners-up ==
Title	Years Held
Current	2
(Japan) Women's Kisei	2004, 2006

Title	Years Lost
Current	1
(Japan) Women's Kisei	2005, 2007
