= Qionglong Mountain =

Mountain in Jiangsu, China

Coordinates: 31.2635°N 120.4237°E

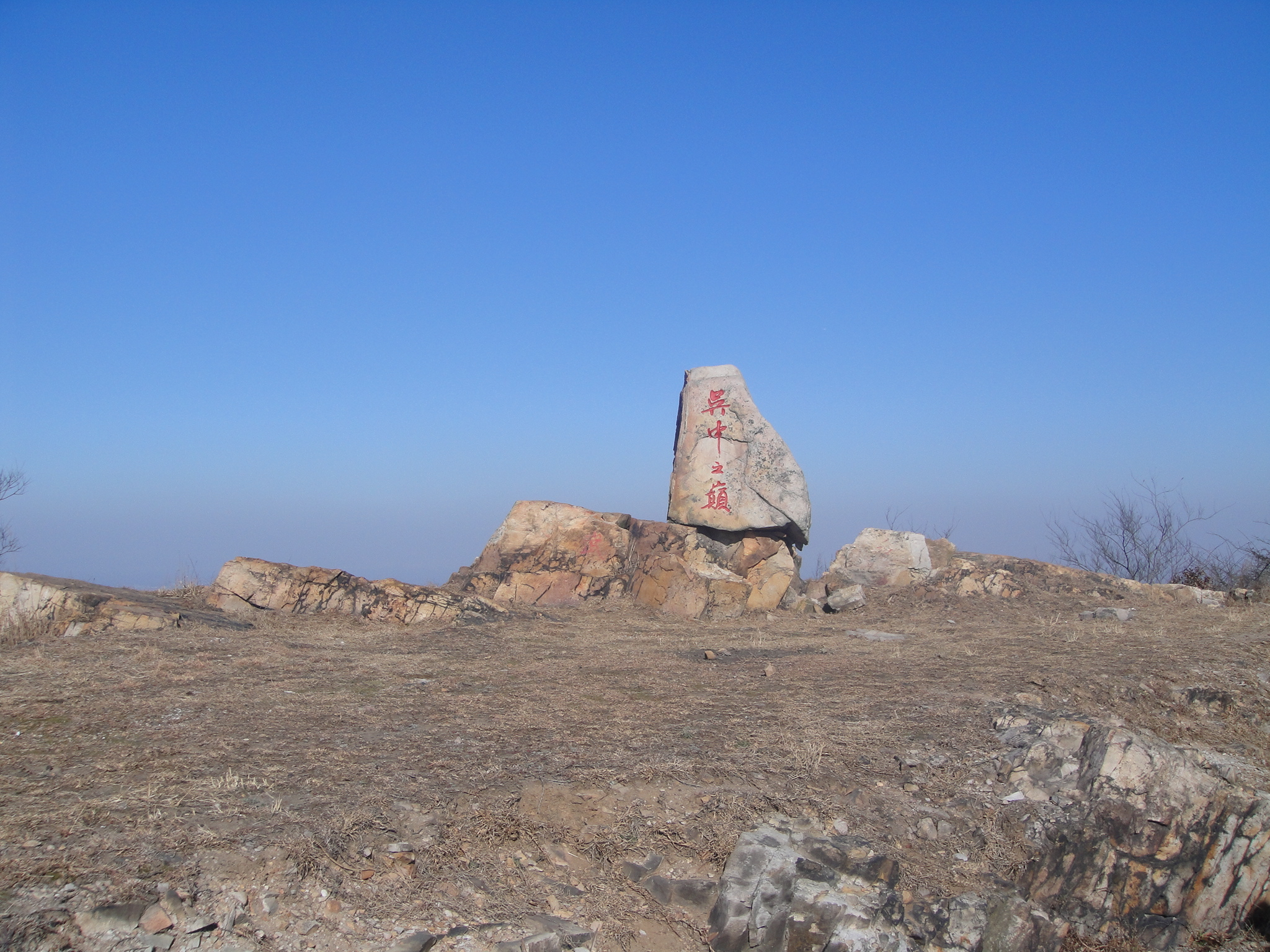
The top of Qionglong Mountain. Those Chinese characters are 吴中之巅(Top of Suzhou).

Qionglong Mountain (Chinese: 穹窿山; pinyin: QióngLóng shān) is the highest mountain of Suzhou, Jiangsu Province. It is located in southwest of Suzhou, whose elevation is 341.7m. One of the most famous ancient Chinese military strategist Sun Tzu lived here after retirement, and he wrote the masterpiece The Art of War here. Qionglong Mountain has the longest sky way in Suzhou and the only provincial natural reserve in Suzhou as well.
