= Hajin, Iran =

Hajin هجين
- Village
- Location within Iran
- Coordinates: 30°02′21″N 56°27′24″E
- Country: Iran
- Province: Kerman
- County: Bardsir
- Bakhsh: Central
- Rural District: Mashiz

Population (2006)
  - Total: 603
- Time zone: UTC+3:30 (IRST)
  - Summer (DST): UTC+4:30 (IRDT)

Hajin (Persian: هجين, also Romanized as Hajīn and Hejīn; also known as Hechīn) is a village in Mashiz Rural District, in the Central District of Bardsir County, Kerman Province, Iran. At the 2006 census, its population was 603, in 154 families.
