= Mariya Zakharchenko =

Ukrainian Go player (born 1995)

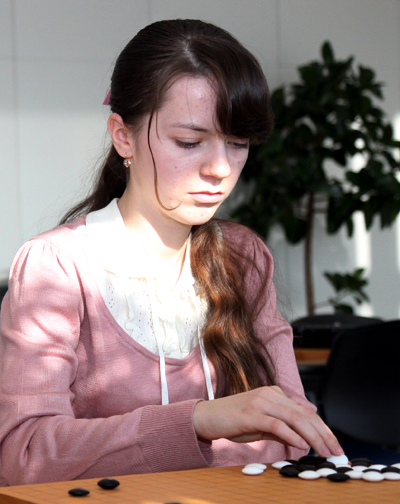

Personal information
- Born: February 16, 1995 (age 31) Kyiv, Ukraine

Sport
- Turned pro: 2012
- Rank: 1-dan pro
- Affiliation: Hanguk Kiwon

Mariya Zakharchenko (born February 16, 1995, Kyiv) is a 1-dan professional Go player from Ukraine. She was awarded professional status by Hanguk Kiwon in 2012.

== Go career ==
Mariya Zakharchenko began playing go in 2005, at the age of 9. She began to studying game in a Kyiv go club where she was coached by Yuri Plusch (5-dan). During a few years Mariya also participated in numerous Ukrainian, European and international amateur competitions.

By 2008 Zakharchenko had reached the rank of 4-dan and was subsequently invited by Mr Poong Jho Chun (9P) to study at a South Korean insei school for women, becoming a grade five insei by the end of the year.

In 2009, Zakharchenko was promoted to a grade three insei after winning a series of games in promotional tournaments. In 2011, Zakharchenko ranked among the top 12 female players in South Korea In 2012, Zakharchenko reached the level of first-grade insei and was subsequently promoted to 1-dan professional by Hanguk Kiwon.

Mariya Zakharchenko went on to win 3 games out of her first 44 professional matches including:

- 21 GS Каlteks (2015.12.07) — Choi Won Young 7p.
- Yoru Monindjon (2014.07.03) — Diána Kőszegi 1p.
