= Jeonggwanjang Cup =

International women's Go competition

The Jeonggwanjang Cup (Korean: 정관장배; Hanja: 正官庄杯; RR: Jeonggwanjangbae) was an international women's Go competition. It was held annually between 2002 and 2011 for a total of 9 times. The first two times, the competition was an individual tournament. Starting from the third cup, it was a team tournament between China, Japan, and South Korea.

== Winners ==
No.	Year	Winner	Score	Runner-up
1	2002–2003	Rui Naiwei	2–1	Zhang Xuan
2	2003–2004	Park Jieun	2–0	Yoon Young Sun

No.	Winner	Years held
3	Team China	2004–2005
4	Team China	2005–2006
5	(South Korea) Team Korea	2006–2007
6	(South Korea) Team Korea	2008
7	Team China	2008–2009
8	(South Korea) Team Korea	2009–2010
9	(South Korea) Team Korea	2011
