= Women's Kakusei =

Japanese Go competition

The Women's Kakusei (女流鶴聖戦) was a Japanese Go competition. It was held annually from 1979 to 2002, a total of 24 times.

== Outline ==
The Women's Kakusei used a knockout format.

== Past winners ==
Women's Kakusei
Player	Years Held
Ito Tomoe	1979
Suzuki Tsuna	1980
Kobayashi Reiko	1981, 1982
Sugiuchi Kazuko	1983, 1986
Kusunoki Teruko	1984, 1985
Ogawa Tomoko	1987
Miyazaki Shimako	1988
Kobayashi Chizu	1989, 1993, 1997
Sakakibara Fumiko	1990
Aoki Kikuyo	1991, 1992, 1994, 2000
Nakazawa Ayako	1995, 1996
Yoshida Mika	1998
Osawa Narumi	1999, 2002
Kato Tomoko	2001

== See also ==
- Kakusei (Go)
