= Toshio Ikeda =

Japanese engineer

- 池田 敏雄
- Born: August 7, 1923
- Died: November 14, 1974 (aged 51)
- Education: Tokyo Institute of Technology
- Occupation: Engineer
- Organization: Fujitsu
- Title: Managing Director

Toshio Ikeda (池田 敏雄, Ikeda Toshio; August 7, 1923 – November 14, 1974) was a Japanese engineer. He was the former managing director of Fujitsu and was the pioneer of domestic computer production in Japan.
