= Feng Yun (Go player) =

Chinese-American Go player (born 1966)

Personal information
- Born: October 2, 1966 (age 59) Liaoning, China

Sport
- Teacher: Huang Jinxian
- Rank: 9 dan
- Affiliation: Chinese Weiqi Association (1984-2000); American Go Association (2000-present)

Feng Yun (Chinese: 丰云; pinyin: Fēng Yún; born October 2, 1966) is a professional Go player. She is the second woman after Rui Naiwei to ever attain the level of 9-dan professional.

== Biography ==
Feng Yun was born in Chong Qing, China. She started learning Go in Henan province when she was nine years old. She began her professional career in 1979 at the age of 12. In 1982 she was selected for the Chinese National Go Team where she trained for 18 years. In 1997, Feng Yun reached the top rank of professional Go players and ascended to 9-dan professional. She was the second woman in the world ever (after Rui Naiwei) to reach 9 dan. She has lived in New Jersey, U.S., with her family since 2000. The Feng Yun Go School, with four locations in New Jersey, has produced many strong players. Her book, The Best Play, analyzes two amateur games played on the internet.

== Professional accomplishments ==
- Feng Yun was a finalist in the first four Bohae Cups, winning on the second occasion (1995), but lost to Rui Naiwei on the other three occasions, finishing 2nd in 1994, 1996 and 1997.
- 1979 Promoted a professional Go player of the Henan Provincial Team
- 1982 Promoted to 4 dan professional
- 1983 Promoted to 5 dan professional, won her first title: National Women's Championship
- 1987 Promoted to 6 dan professional
- 1990 Finished second in National Individual Go Tournament (China)
- 1991 Finished second in National Individual Go Tournament (China)
- 1992 Promoted to 7 dan professional
- 1995 Promoted to 8 dan professional
- 1997 Advanced to 9 dan professional, one of the only three women 9p in the world
- 1998 Won Kuerle Cup champion
- 2002 Founded first 9-dan school in North America, was the challenger in the 2002 North American Masters Tournament
- 2004 Won Ing Pro Tournament held at the 20th AGA Go Congress in Rochester, New York
- 2008 Won Ing Pro Tournament held at the 24th AGA Go Congress in Portland, Oregon
