= Kaori Chinen =

Japanese Go player

Personal information
- Native name: 知念かおり (Japanese)
- Full name: Kaori Chinen
- Born: July 28, 1974 (age 51) Okinawa, Japan

Sport
- Teacher: Hajime Tokimoto
- Rank: 6 dan
- Affiliation: Nihon Ki-in

Kaori Chinen (知念 かおり, Chinen Kaori; born July 28, 1974, in Okinawa, Japan) is a professional Go player.

== Biography ==
Kaori Chinen became a professional in 1993. She was promoted to 3 dan four years later in 1997. She married fellow professional go player Yo Kagen in 1997. She holds the female record for longest defense of a title, keeping the Women's Kisei for 6 straight years.

== Titles & runners-up ==
Title	Years Held
Current	9
(Japan) Women's Honinbo	1997–1999, 2004
(Japan) Women's Kisei	2000–2003, 2005

Title	Years Lost
Current	5
(Japan) Women's Honinbo	1995, 2000, 2002
(Japan) Women's Kisei	2004, 2006
