= Lee Min-jin =

South Korean Go player

Lee Minjin
Personal information
- Native name: 이민진 (Korean); 李玟眞 (Korean); I Minjin (Revised Romanization); I Minjin (McCune–Reischauer)
- Full name: Lee Minjin
- Born: July 11, 1984 (age 42) South Korea

Sport
- Turned pro: 1999
- Teacher: Kim Won
- Rank: 8 dan
- Affiliation: Hanguk Kiwon

Lee Min-jin
Medal record

Representing South Korea

Asian Games
Gold medal – first place	2010 Guangzhou	Women's Team

Lee Minjin (born July 11, 1984), also known as Yi Minjin, is a South Korean female professional Go player of 8 dan rank and the current women's Go champion of Jeonggwanjang Cup. She won silver at the 2008 World Mind Sports Games.
