= Lee Ha-jin =

South Korean Go player

Personal information
- Native name: 이하진 (Korean); 李夏辰 (Korean)
- Full name: Lee Ha-jin
- Born: June 21, 1988 (age 38) South Korea

Sport
- Rank: 4 dan

Lee Ha-jin (Korean: 이하진; born 21 June 1988; known as Haylee on YouTube) is a retired professional Go player from South Korea. From July 2014 to 2016, she served as Secretary General of the International Go Federation. She is now a software development engineer with an MBA.

== Early life ==
Lee was born and grew up in Daejeon, South Korea. She is the elder daughter of an engineer father and an accountant mother, both of whom are avid Go players. Lee naturally picked up an interest in Go at a young age, and her parents began teaching her the game when she was 5 years old. As her talents won increasing recognition, her parents sent Lee to a professional Go school in Seoul, to live at the master’s house with him, his family, and several fellow students. Lee was 9 years old, and from that time on would take a break from her Go studies only for a few days each year to visit her family.

== Career ==
Lee debuted as a professional player in 2004, at the age of 16, passing the intense competition that selected one new female pro annually. As a professional player, she was often listed among the top female players in Korea. She won 1st place in the women’s division of the 5th ETLand Cup Professional Baduk Championship in 2008, and won a bronze medal at the 2008 World Mind Sports Games in the same year. She qualified 4 times for the Korean national team (2006, 2007, 2008, 2010), which selects 5 female professional players each year for the Jeongganjang Cup international women’s team championship.

Lee became Secretary General at the International Go Federation (IGF) in July 2014. She was International Go Ambassador at SportAccord World Mind Games in Beijing in 2014.

She wrote a book about her experience as a professional player, Outside the Board: Diary of a Professional Go Player.

== Retirement from Go ==
Lee Hajin was promoted to 4 dan in 2016. The same year, she retired from professional Go and stepped down from her role as Secretary General of the IGF.

Lee ran a YouTube channel, Haylee's World of Go/Baduk, demonstrating high-level Go in English. In her YouTube video #142, titled "Mountain View", she announced that she has moved to the United States, living in Mountain View, California. Lee Hajin's last video was 2020 AGA City League R7 - Game Review (Haylee vs Hanchen Zhang), 31 May 2020. On her “About” page, she says, “NOTE: This channel is no longer updated. Thank you for many years of support!”

== Career after retirement from professional Go ==
On her personal website, she uses the Western order of her name, Hajin Lee. She describes her Go/Baduk career, academic studies finishing with MBA with honors from the University of Geneva in 2018, and occupations. She is currently a software development engineer at Amazon (since September 2022).

Lee is still a Go administrator. She is Executive Director of the North American Go Federation and International Affairs Manager of the American Go Association.
