= Choi Jeong (Go player) =

South Korean Go player

Personal information
- Native name: 최정 (Korean); 崔精 (Korean)
- Born: 7 October 1996 (age 30) South Korea

Sport
- Turned pro: 2010
- Teacher: Yoo Chang-hyuk
- Rank: 9 dan
- Affiliation: Hanguk Kiwon
Medal record
Women's Go
Representing South Korea
Asian Games
Silver medal – second place	2022 Hangzhou	Women's team

Choi Jeong (born 7 October 1996), or Choi Jung, is a South Korean professional Go player.

A student of Yoo Chang-hyuk, Choi Jeong became a professional Go player in 2010. Her first tournament championship was the Female Myungin in 2012, a title which she held for five years up to end of the tournament in 2016. Beginning in December 2013, she was the number one woman in the Korea Baduk Association's official ranking, a position which she maintained for 128 consecutive months until August 2024.

She has won seven women's international titles: four times in the Bingsheng Cup (2014, 2017, 2018, 2019) and three times in the Wu Qingyuan Cup (2019, 2021, 2023). In December 2019, she became the first woman to reach the top 20 in the official ranking of all Korea Baduk Association players. In the 2022 Samsung Cup, she became the first woman to reach the finals of a major world tournament.

Choi Jeong, who dominated women's Go in South Korea from 2014 to 2024, reaffirmed her strong position in the field by winning the 2024 Dr. G Women's Top Player Championship, maintaining her impressive record in this tournament. She was also widely regarded as the best female Go player in the world during her time.

== Path to professional ==
Choi's father, an amateur 1-dan in baduk (Go), started teaching Choi Jeong baduk after hearing from an academy director that his daughter had talent for the game. When she was in third grade of elementary school, they moved to Seoul, and she began attending 'Yoo Chang-hyuk Baduk Academy' in Mapo-gu. Choi Jeong, who formed a teacher-student relationship with 9-dan Yoo Chang-hyuk, even moved to Bundang when Yoo Chang-hyuk's baduk academy relocated there. In May 2010, at the age of 14 while attending the second year of Chungam Middle School, she became a professional at the Korea Baduk Association. She inherited her teacher Yoo Chang-hyuk's style, being strong in reading and combative. She doesn't hunker down in one place but boldly jumps into enemy territory. It's commonly said that her style is to cut when attached and to push when pushed. In 2012, she dropped out of high school where she had enrolled as a baduk specialist. This was because it was difficult to balance baduk competitions and academics. In the same year, she won the 13th Female Myungin title for the first time.

== International competitions ==
Competitions	2012	2013	2014	2015	2016	2017	2018	2019	2020	2021	2022	2023	2024	2025	2026
Samsung Cup	×	×	×	×	×	×	R16	R32	×	×	RU	R32	R16	×	×
LG Cup	×	×	×	×	R16	R32	×	R16	R32	×	×	×	×	R16	×
Mlily Cup	-	×	-	×	-	×	-	×	-			R32	-		R64
Kuksu Mountains	-						×	×	-	R16	×	×	×	×	×
Nanyang Cup	-												R32	-	
Bailing Cup	×	-	R64	-	×	-	×	-							
Wu Qingyuan Cup	-						RU	W	R16	W	SF	W	R16	RU	
Senko Cup	-						SF	RU	-	RU	QF	W	W	RU	×
Bingsheng Cup	R16	QF	W	SF	R16	W	W	W	-						
Huanglongshi Cup	0:1	3:0	0:1	3:0	0:1	0:0	3:1	2:0	-				RR	-	

(W) Winner; (RU) Runner-up; (SF) Semifinalist; (QF) Quarterfinalist; (R16) Round of 16; (R32) Round of 32; (R64) Round of 64; (RR) Round-robin.

- Note 1: Some competitions last for more than one year. In that case, the beginning year of the competition is recorded as the year of competition.
- Note 2: The light green background indicates that the player is still competing in the competition.
- Note 3: '×' means the player did not participate (or lost in the qualification round), while '-' means the competition was not held in that year.
- Note 4: The Huanglongshi Cup was a team competition until 2020, after which it switched to a round-robin format. The result is indicated as matches won : matches lost. The result '0:0' means the player qualified for her national team, and the team won before the player had the chance to compete in the cup.

== Professional career ==
- 2010: 4th Jiji Auction Cup Main Tournament (제4기 지지옥션배 본선)
- 2011: olleh Cup Main Tournament (olleh배 본선), 5th Jiji Auction Cup 8 consecutive wins (제5기 지지옥션배 8연승), 5th Women's Kisung Tournament Runner-up (제5기 여류기성전 준우승)
- 2012: 13th Women's Myungin Tournament Champion (제13기 여류명인전 우승), 6th Jiji Auction Cup Women's Team Victory (제6기 지지옥션배 여류팀 우승)
- 2013: 14th Women's Myungin Tournament Champion (제14기 여류명인전 우승), 3rd Hwangryongsa Twin Lamp Cup (제3회 황룡사 쌍등배), 4th Incheon Asian Indoor & Martial Arts Games (제4회 인천 실내&무도 아시안게임), 4th Qingyun Mountain Bingsheng Cup (제4회 궁륭산 병성배)
- 2014: 2013 Rockstar League Women's Player Award (2013 락스타리그 여자기사상), 1st Globiz Cup World New Star Championship (제1회 글로비즈배 세계신예선수권), 15th Women's Myungin Tournament Champion (제15기 여류명인전 우승)
- 2016: 21st LG Cup World Baduk Championship (제21회 LG배 세계기왕전)
- 2017: 22nd LG Cup World Baduk Championship (제22회 LG배 세계기왕전)
- 2018: 23rd Samsung Fire & Marine Insurance World Baduk Masters (제23회 삼성화재배 월드바둑마스터즈)
- 2019: 24th LG Cup Chosun Ilbo Baduk King Tournament (제24회 LG배 조선일보 기왕전)
- 2019: 3rd Hankuk Kiwha Women's Kisung Tournament (제3기 한국제지배 여자 기성전)
- 2020: 4th Hankuk Kiwha Women's Kisung Tournament (제4기 한국제지배 여자 기성전)
- 2021: 1st IBK Industrial Bank Women's Baduk Masters (제1기 IBK 기업은행 여자바둑 마스터스)
- 2021: 4th Wu Qingyan Cup World Women's Baduk Championship (제4회 오청원배 세계 여자 바둑선수권)
- 2021: 1st Dr. G Women's Top Player Championship (제1기 닥터지 여자최고기사결정전)
- 2022: 1st Hoban Cup Women's Baduk Top Player Championship (제1기 호반배 여자바둑 최고기사 결정전)
- 2022: 27th Samsung Fire & Marine Insurance World Baduk Masters (27회 삼성화재배 월드 바둑마스터스)
- 2022: 6th Hyesung Women's Kisung Tournament (제6기 혜성 여자기성전)
- 2022: 2nd Dr. G Women's Top Player Championship (제2기 닥터지 여자최고기사결정전)
- 2023: 5th Senko Cup World Women's Baduk Strongest Player Tournament (제5회 센코컵 월드바둑여류최강전)
- 2023: 3rd IBK Industrial Bank Women's Baduk Masters (제3기 IBK 기업은행 여자바둑 마스터스)
- 2023: 3rd Dr. G Women's Top Player Championship (제3기 닥터지 여자최고기사결정전)
- 2024: 4th Dr. G Women's Top Player Championship (제4기 닥터지 여자최고기사결정전)
- 2025: 5th Dr. G Women's Top Player Championship (제5기 닥터지 여자최고기사결정전)
