= Xie Yimin =

Taiwanese Go player

Personal information
- Native name: Trad. 謝依旻 Simp. 谢依旻 (Chinese); Xiè Yīmín (Pinyin)
- Born: 16 November 1989 (age 36) Miaoli, Taiwan

Sport
- Turned pro: 2004
- Teacher: Kou Mousei
- Rank: 7 dan
- Affiliation: Nihon Ki-in; Tokyo branch

Xie Yimin

Chinese name
- Traditional Chinese: 謝依旻
- Simplified Chinese: 谢依旻
Transcriptions
Standard Mandarin
- Hanyu Pinyin: Xiè Yīmín
- Bopomofo: ㄒㄧㄝˋ ㄧ ㄇㄧㄣˊ
- Wade–Giles: Hsieh^{4} Yi^{1}min^{2}

Japanese name
- Kanji: 謝依旻
- Kana: しぇい いみん
Transcriptions
- Romanization: Shei Imin

Xie Yimin (simplified Chinese: 谢依旻; traditional Chinese: 謝依旻; pinyin: Xiè Yīmín; born on 16 November 1989) is a Taiwanese-born professional Go player in Japan. She holds the titles of Honorary Female Honinbo and Honorary Female Meijin, and, as of 2016, holds three major female titles in Japan: Female Meijin, Female Kisei and Female Honinbo.

== Biography ==
Xie started playing Go at the age of five at the Go school that her older brother was attending. At age seven, she competed in a children's group tournament held in South Korea as the fifth member of the Taipei team, and won three out of three matches. After winning the Kaiho National Children's Go Cup at age eight, Cheng Mingchi introduced her to Kou Mousei, her future teacher. Xie became an insei at the Nihon Ki-in in 2002.

Xie became a professional Go player in 2004. By becoming a professional at age 14 years and 4 months, she set the record for the youngest female professional player at the time. Also, she was the fourth female player to become a professional through the main league rather than the females-only special league.

In 2006, Xie became the first winner of the Wakagoi Cup, a tournament among players 30 years old or younger and 5-dan or lower. This was the first victory of a mix-gender tournament by a female player in the history of Nihon Ki-in. Also in 2006, she won the title of Female Saikyo. This set the record for the youngest female holder of a title, at age 17 and 1 month. Due to these achievements she won the annual Kido Female Award from Nihon Ki-in.

In 2007, Xie entered the NHK Cup TV Go Tournament. She won the first match against Lin Tzuyuan, but lost the second against Rissei Ō. She entered the Female Honinbo tournament and defeated Kumiko Yashiro, becoming the youngest Female Honinbo at age 17 and 11 months. She also was the challenger for Female Meijin title, and had the third highest number of wins among all players (40 wins and 16 losses). She won the Kido Female Award for the second consecutive year.

In 2008, Xie and Rin Kono won the second place in the Pair Go Tournament. In the same year she obtained the Female Meijin title, becoming the second Female Honinbo-Meijin after Izumi Kobayashi. She won the Kido Female Award for the third consecutive year, as well as the Kido Shinjin Award. She played in the Female Saikyo finals, but was defeated by Keiko Kato. She survived the Shinjin-O preliminaries, and played in the main tournament.

In 2009, Xie succeeded in defending both her Female Meijin and Honinbo titles. At the 57th NHK Cup TV Go Tournament, she defeated Noriyoshi Yamada and Tomochika Mizokami but was defeated by Satoshi Yuki, who proceeded to win the tournament, in the third round. Xie also won the Kido Female Award for the fourth year.

In 2010, she obtained the Female Kisei title by defeating Umezawa Yukari, and became the first player to hold the three major female titles simultaneously. She defended the Female Honinbo and Meijin titles from the challenger Chiaki Mukai, winning the Kido Yushu Kishi Award and her fifth Kido Female Award.

In 2011, Xie and O Meien won the Pair Go Tournament. She defended the Female Kisei title against Yukari Umezawa, becoming the longest holder of the title (ten years). In the Female Meijin finals, she lost the first match of three against Mukai. The second match was played on March 11, but was paused halfway due to the 2011 Miyagi earthquake. She won the resumed match two weeks later, and the third match as well, successfully defending the title. Due to these achievements she obtained the Kido Special Award, Kido Yushu Kishi Award, and her sixth Kido Female Award. In the 59th NHK Cup she became the first female player to enter the quarter-finals, but was defeated by Naoki Hane.

In 2012, Xie and O Meien won the Pair Go Tournament again. She lost her Female Kisei title to the challenger Kikuyo Aoki, losing her reign as the three-title holder. In the following Female Meijin tournament, Xie defeated Chiaki Mukai for the third consecutive year, winning the title for the fifth year in row. This gave her the title of Honorary Female Meijin. She also formed a singer group MONOTONE along with fellow Go players Taiki Seto and Seiken Takanashi, and released their first single, i★GO.

In 2013, Xie played against Kikuyo Aoki as the challenger, and won back the title, returning to having the three titles. In this year's Pair Go Tournament, she formed a new pair with Kobayashi Satoru and for the third consecutive year became the champion. In November she lost her Female Honinbo title to Chiaki Mukai in a 2–3 defeat.

In 2014, Xie defended the Female Kisei title from the challenger Kikuyo Aoki for the second consecutive year. She also defended the title of Female Meijin for the seventh consecutive year, this time from the challenger Keiko Kato.

In 2015, Xie defeated Rina Fujisawa 3–2 in the Female Honinbo tournament, winning the title for the first time in three years.

In 2016, Xie became a guest professor at Heian Jogakuin University. She defended the Female Meijin title from the challenger Kikuyo Aoki, making this her ninth consecutive year with the title.

In March 2017, Xie lost the Female Meijin title to Fujisawa Rina after losing 0–2 in the title defense. In June 2017, she became the runner up for the 4th Aizu Central Hospital Cup.

== Promotion record ==
Rank	Year	Notes
1 dan	2004	
2 dan	2005	Promoted based on the prize money ranking
3 dan	2006	Promoted based on the prize money ranking
4 dan	2008	Promoted based on the prize money ranking
5 dan	2010	Promoted based on the prize money ranking
6 dan	2012	Promoted based on the prize money ranking
7 dan	2021	Won 120 games while 6 dan
8 dan		
9 dan		

== Titles and runners-up ==
Title	Wins	Runners-up
Wakagoi Cup	1 (2006)	0
Female Kisei	7 (2010–11, 13–17)	1
Female Meijin	9 (2008–16)	1 (2017)
Female Honinbo	8 (2007–12, 15, 17)	1
Aizu Central Hospital Cup	1 (2016)	2 (2015, 2017)
Female Saikyo	1 (2016)	1 (2017)
Total	26	6

== Personal life ==
Xie enjoys hip-hop dance as a hobby, and has previously performed at various events.
