= Sumire Nakamura =

Japanese Go player (born 2009)

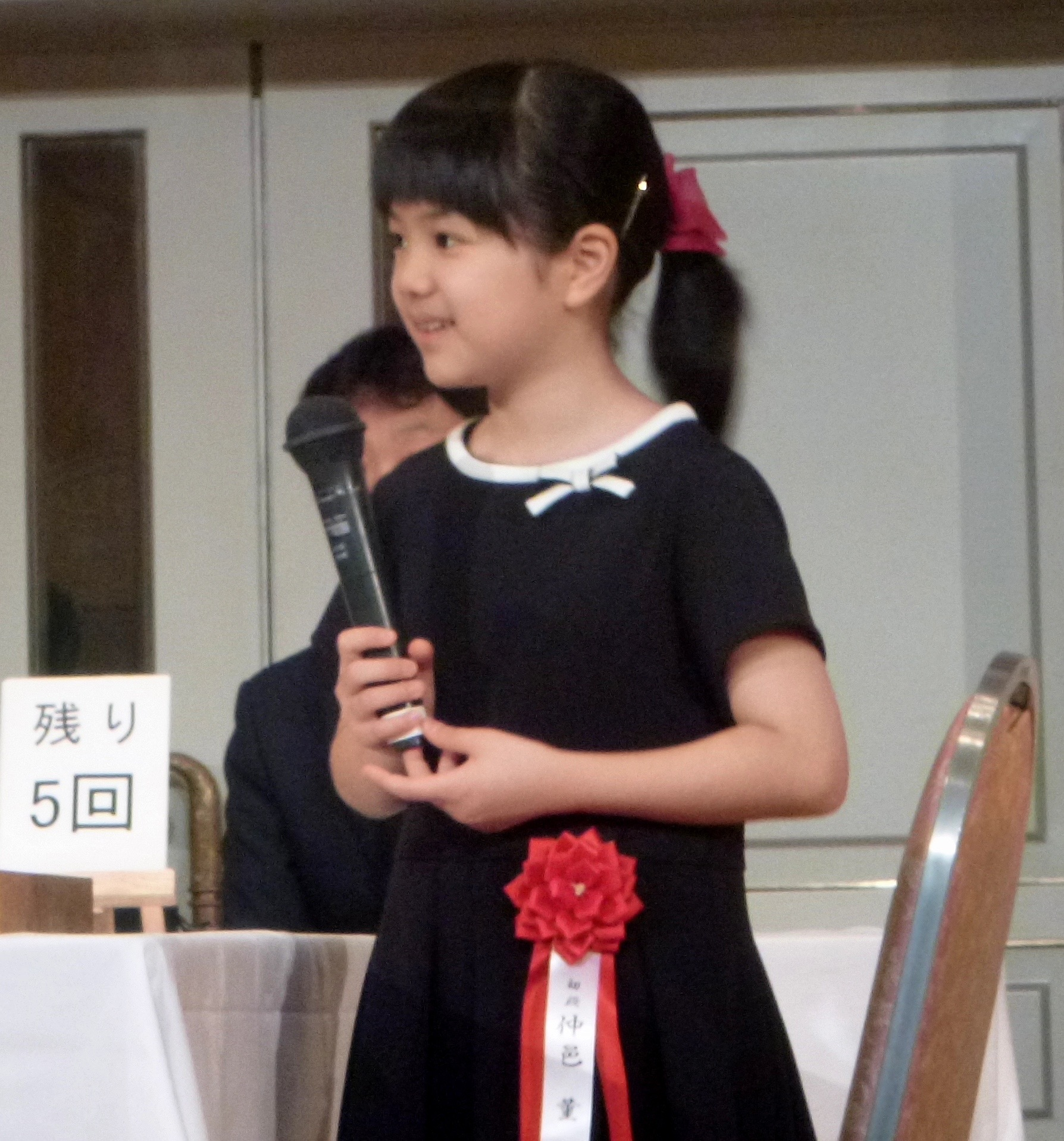
- June 2019 World Go Festival in Takarazuka City Japan

Personal information
- Born: March 2, 2009 (age 17) Tokyo, Japan

Sport
- Turned pro: 2019
- Rank: 6 dan
- Affiliation: Hanguk Kiwon

Sumire Nakamura (仲邑 菫, Nakamura Sumire; born March 2, 2009) is a Japanese professional Go player. She became the youngest ever professional Go player in Japan on April 1, 2019. She made her professional debut on April 22, 2019 in the preliminary round of the Ryusei tournament in western Japan at age 10 years and one month, breaking the record held by Rina Fujisawa in 2010 at age 11 years and 8 months. She is also the first Go player to turn pro under Nihon Ki-in's special screening system for "prospective, talented" players who can compete with top players from other countries.

== Biography ==
Born in 2009 in Tokyo, Japan, Nakamura is the daughter of Shinya Nakamura, a 9-dan professional Go player. She started playing the ancient board game with her father when she was three and has been competing in national tournaments in Japan since she was seven.

At the end of her first calendar year (2019) as a professional, the Power Report (for December 30, 2019) says "Sumire’s record for the first 'year' (actually nine months) of her career was 17–7, a winning record of 70.8%. These stats were the best of the 13 new 1-dans who debuted in 2019."

According to "The Power Report: Woman power hits Japanese go" at American Go Association's E-Journal, Nakamura is doing amazingly well in the first third of 2021 (January 1 to April 30). For this period, she has the most wins (21 wins to 2 losses) at the Nihon Ki-in, the best streak of consecutive wins (10 wins since March 18), and the best winning percentage (91.3% with no rivals of either gender in sight).

Nakamura Sumire's parents decided to send her to South Korea for Go training in 2017 because they believed she needed more challenging opponents to continue improving her skills.

On 6 February 2023, at the age of 13 years and 11 months, Nakamura became the youngest ever winner of the Women's Kisei. She defeated defending champion Ueno Asami by two games to one.

In September 2023, it was revealed that Sumire had applied to the Korea Baduk Association to play professionally in South Korea. She remains in Japan through February 2024. She continued to compete in Nihon Ki-in matches during that time, particularly the Women's Kisei title defense match in February 2024, which she lost to Ueno Risa.

She secured her first, albeit unofficial, Korean title on June 10, 2024, just three months after transferring to South Korea, defeating 9-dan Yu-Jin Oh (오유진) in the finals of the International Go Chunhyang Selection Tournament (국제바둑춘향 선발대회)..

Sumire's first official Korean title was the 4th Hyorim Cup (“Future Empress”) on 6 Nov 2025, defeating 5-dan [Yu-jin Jeong] in the final.

Her first official Korean mixed-sex title was the 4th Yanggu-gun National Central Land Cup Tengen Tournament, for juniors; that year, for players born in 2007 or later. She defeated 3-dan Jung Jun-woo in the final, to become the first female winner of this event.

On 6 March 2026, two days before her victory, she was promoted to 5-dan. The victory also earned her an automatic promotion by one dan rank to 6-dan on 8 March.
