= Kikuyo Aoki =

Japanese Go player

Personal information
- Native name: 青木 喜久代 (Japanese)
- Full name: Kikuyo Aoki
- Born: May 24, 1968 (age 58) Tokyo, Japan

Sport
- Turned pro: 1986
- Teacher: Yasuro Kikuchi
- Rank: 8 dan
- Affiliation: Nihon Ki-in

Kikuyo Aoki (青木 喜久代, Aoki Kikuyo; born May 24, 1968) is an 8-dan professional Go player.

== Biography ==
Kikuyo joined the Nihon Ki-in in 1981. She is the sister of Shinichi Aoki, who is a 9 dan professional at the Nihon Ki-in. Kikuyo has won 10 major titles.

== Promotion Record ==
Rank	Year	Notes
1 dan	1986	
2 dan	1987	
3 dan	1989	
4 dan	1992	
5 dan	1993	
6 dan	1995	
7 dan	1997	
8 dan	2000	
9 dan		

== Titles ==
Title	Years Held
Current	11
(Japan) Women's Meijin	1990, 1999, 2000, 2002, 2006
(Japan) Women's Kakusei	1991, 1992, 1994, 2000
(Japan) Women's Saikyo	2001
(Japan) Women's Kisei	2012

== See also ==
- International Go Federation
- List of Go organizations
- List of professional Go tournaments
