= Rina Fujisawa =

Japanese Go player (born 1998)

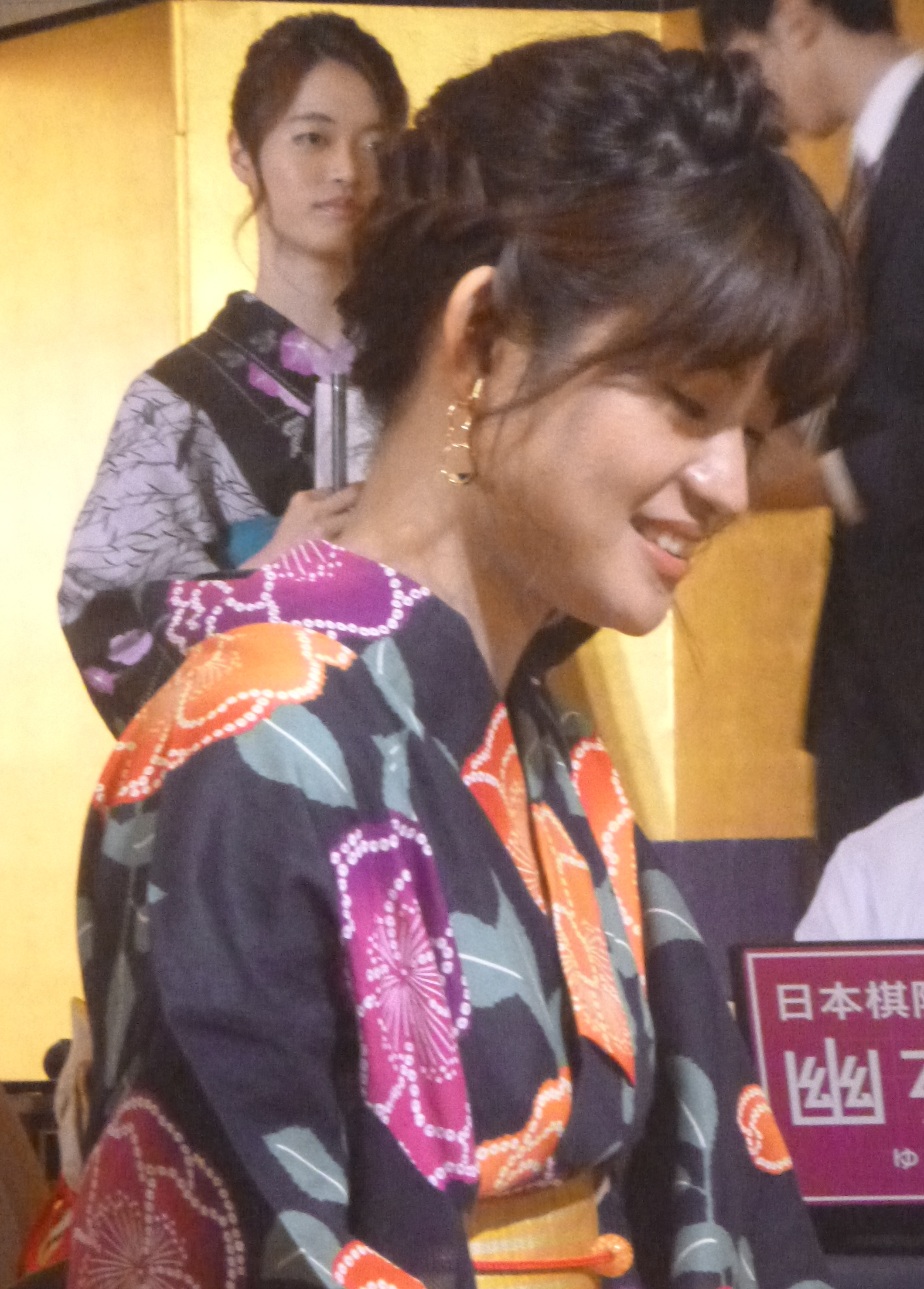
- Fujisawa in 2019

Personal information
- Born: 18 September 1998 (age 27) Saitama Prefecture, Japan

Sport
- Turned pro: 2010
- Rank: 7 dan
- Affiliation: Nihon Ki-in
Medal record
Women's Go
Representing Japan
Asian Games
Bronze medal – third place	2022 Hangzhou	Women's team

Rina Fujisawa (藤沢 里菜 Fujisawa Rina, born 18 September 1998) is a Japanese professional Go player.

== Biography ==
Fujisawa is the daughter of Kazunari Fujisawa, an 8-dan professional Go player. She is also the granddaughter of the late Honorary Kisei, Hideyuki Fujisawa. She became a professional player in 2010 at the age of 11 years and 6 months, making her the youngest player in Japan to become pro; it was announced on 5 January 2019 that this record would be broken by Sumire Nakamura on 1 April 2019.

== Achievements ==
In 2014, she was the winner of the 1st Aizu Central Hospital Cup. The victory made her the youngest female title holder in Japan at 15 years and 9 months. Later that year, she won the Female Honinbo title. She was the youngest Female Honinbo title holder at the age of 16 years and 1 month. The previous record was set by Hsieh Yimin at the age of 17 years and 11 months.

In 2015, she lost the Female Honinbo title to Hsieh Yimin. Fujisawa won the first two games, but lost the remaining three games.

In March 2016, she won the 2nd Ibero-Japan Cup, a tournament limited to players under 18. She beat Toramaru Shibano in the final and became the second female player to win an open title after Hsieh Yimin. In October, she beat Hsieh Yimin to retake the Female Honinbo title.

In March 2017, Fujisawa won the Female Meijin title. She beat Hsieh Yimin by 2–0. In June 2017, she beat Hsieh Yimin by 2–1 to win her second Aizu Central Hospital Cup. In July 2017, Fujisawa beat Hsieh Yimin to win the second Senko Cup.

In November 2020, Fujisawa won the Hiroshima Aluminum Cup Young Carp Tournament, becoming the first woman in Japanese professional Go to win an official tournament open to both female and male players. (Hsieh Yimin had won the same tournament before, but at the time it was an unofficial tournament.)

== Titles ==
Title	Years Held
Current	6
(Japan) Aizu Central Hospital Cup	2014, 2017
(Japan) Female Honinbo	2014, 2016
(Japan) Female Meijin	2017
(Japan) Female Kisei	2019, 2020
(Japan) Senko Cup Female Saikyo	2017, 2019, 2021

== Career Record ==
- 2013: 24–14
- 2014: 42–16
- 2015: 34–27
- 2016: 35–20
- 2017: 40–24

== Ranking ==
- 1 dan: April 2010
- 2 dan: October 2013
- 3 dan: August 2015
- 4 dan: April 2018
- 5 dan: April 2021
- 6 dan: January 2023
- 7 dan: January 2024
