= Rui Naiwei =

Chinese Go player (born 1963)

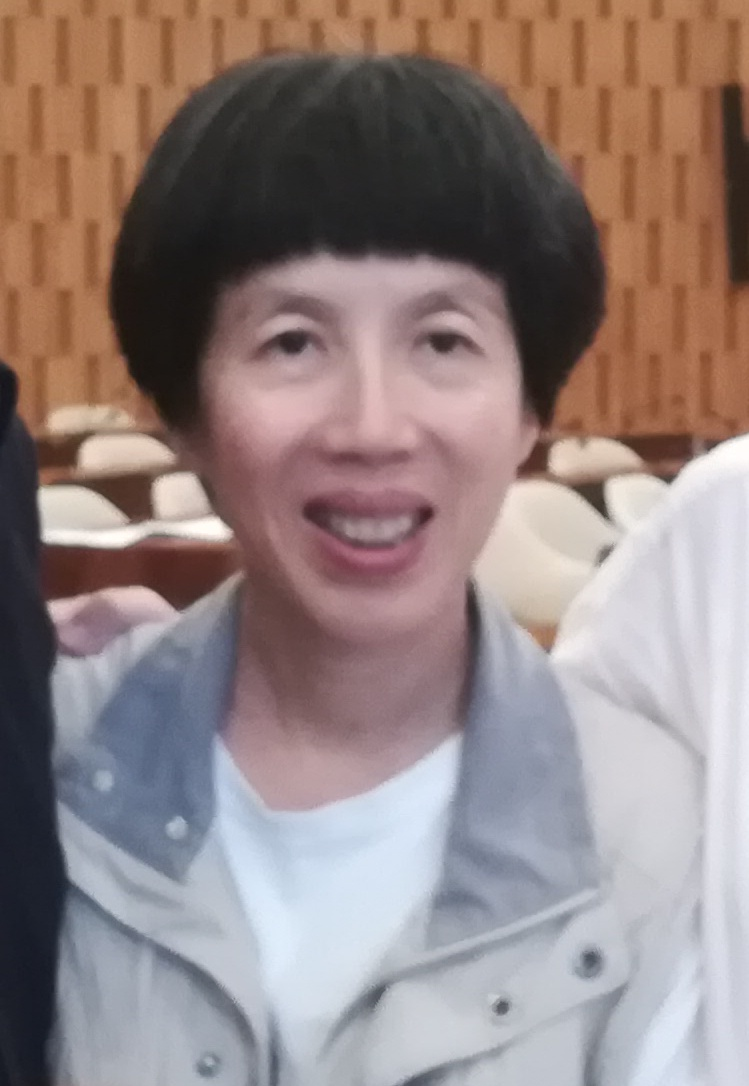

Personal information
- Native name: 루이나이웨이 (Korean); 芮迺偉 (Korean); Trad. 芮迺偉 Simp. 芮迺伟 (Chinese); Ruì Nǎiwěi (Pinyin)
- Born: December 28, 1963 (age 62) Shanghai, China

Sport
- Turned pro: 1985 (full time)
- Teacher: Wu Qing-yuan, Yang Yilun
- Rank: 9 dan
- Affiliation: Zhongguo Qiyuan (1985–19??); American Go Association (19??–1999); Hanguk Kiwon (1999–2011); Zhongguo Qiyuan (2011–present)

Rui Naiwei
Medal record

Representing China

Asian Games
Silver medal – second place	2010 Guangzhou	Women's Team

Rui Naiwei (simplified Chinese: 芮迺伟; traditional Chinese: 芮迺偉; pinyin: Ruì Nǎiwěi; born December 28, 1963) is a Chinese professional Go player, once active in South Korea. She is the strongest recorded female Go player, and is the only woman to have won one of the major open Go titles. She achieved this by winning the 1999 Guksu title (the oldest and one of the most prestigious Go competitions in Korea), on the way beating Lee Chang-Ho and Cho Hun-hyun, the two strongest players in the world at the time.

== Biography ==
Rui was born in Shanghai, China. After starting to play around 1975 (at the age of 11—the age some other players go pro) she became a pro for the Zhongguo Qiyuan in 1985, being promoted all the way to 7-dan that year. She reached 9-dan in 1988, becoming the first woman ever to achieve that rank. After that, Chinese Feng Yun and Korean Park Jieun became the second and third female go players to reach 9 dan, following Rui Naiwei.

Leaving China in 1989, she moved to Japan. While the Nihon Ki-in did not allow her to play in any Japanese tournaments, she was able to make it to the semi-finals of the international Ing Cup in 1992. She spent several years in the San Francisco Bay Area.

She then moved to South Korea (with the help of Cho Hun-hyeon 9-dan). She participated actively in Korean tournaments. She dominated the women's events and won two open events, always previously won by men: the Guksu (the 43rd open Guksu title in South Korea, 1999) and the Maxim Cup (2004).

She returned to China in 2011.

Rui's style tends to be extremely aggressive, and often characterized by large scale semeai.

Her husband is Jiang Zhujiu, also a 9-dan professional.

== Titles & runners-up ==
Ranks #6-t in total number of titles in Korea.

Title	Years Held
Current	17
(South Korea) Guksu	1999
(South Korea) Maxim Cup	2004
(South Korea) Women's Myungin	2000–2002, 2004–2007
(South Korea) Women's Guksu	2000–2002, 2006, 2007
(South Korea) Women's Kisung	2006
(China) National Women's Individual	1986–1989
International	7
(South Korea) (China) (Japan) Jeongganjang Cup	2003
(South Korea) (China) (Japan) Hungchang Cup	2000, 2001
(South Korea) (China) (Japan) Eastern Airlines Cup	2000
(South Korea) (China) (Japan) Bohae Cup	1994, 1996, 1997

Title	Years Lost
Current	4
(South Korea) Guksu	2000
(South Korea) Maxim Cup	2003
(South Korea) Women's Guksu	2003
(South Korea) Women's Myungin	2003
Defunct	4
(South Korea) LG Refined Oil Cup	2000
(United States) North American Masters Tournament	1996, 1999, 2000
