= Joanne Missingham =

Taiwanese Go player

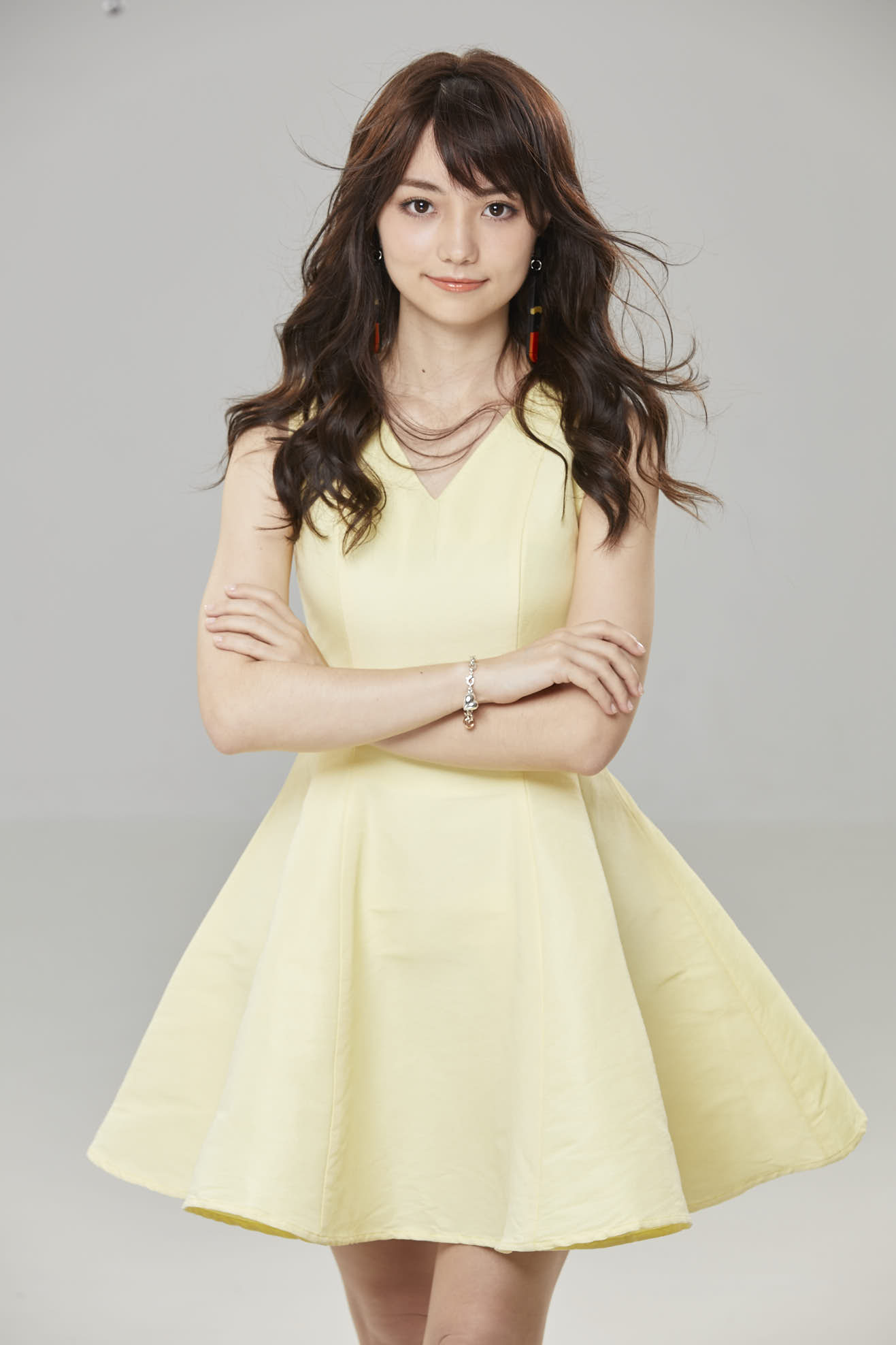

Personal information
- Native name: 黑嘉嘉 (Chinese)
- Born: May 26, 1994 (age 32) Brisbane, Australia

Sport
- Turned pro: 2008
- Teacher: Zhou Keping; Lin Shengxian; Ruan Yunsheng; Wu Kai
- Rank: 7 dan
- Affiliation: Taiwan Qiyuan

Joanne Missingham
- Chinese: 黑嘉嘉
Transcriptions
Standard Mandarin
- Hanyu Pinyin: Hēi Jiājiā

Joanne Missingham (Chinese: 黑嘉嘉; Wade–Giles: hei chia chia; born 26 May 1994) is an Australian-born Taiwanese professional Go player and actor. She is the first Australian-born player to achieve a professional go ranking.

In 2010 she came second in the Qionglongshan Bingsheng Cup and won the 1st Taiwan Wei-ch'i Association Women's Professionals Representative Right Ranking tournament. As of 2016 she has a Go ranking of 7 dan, and is the highest ranked female go player in Taiwan.

== Life and career ==
Missingham was born in 1994 in Brisbane, Australia before moving to Taiwan at the age of four. Her father is Australian, and her mother Hei Nanping was Taiwanese. She died of leukemia in 2014. Missingham studied under professional Go player Zhou Keping and later moved to San Diego in 2005 with her family. In 2010 she became a 1 dan member of the Taiwan Chi Yuan and in the same year was promoted again to 2 dan after coming second in the Bingsheng Cup. Missingham plays professionally under her mother's maiden name and Chinese given name, Hei Jiajia.

Missingham gained media attention in 2011 when she, along with other female players boycotted the Qiandeng Cup after having learned that male players were being paid US$886 per game while female players were not paid at all. In a later tournament she held up a fan with the words in Chinese "protest gender discrimination".

In 2016 she signed a record deal with Taiwanese record company Seed Music (種子音樂) to appear in adverts and television productions.

She appeared in My Missing Valentine, an award-winning 2020 Taiwanese romantic comedy film, as a post officer.

== Promotion record ==
Rank	Year	Notes
1 dan	2008	Promoted to professional dan rank for performance in the Chinese professional qualification tournament.
2 dan	2010	Attained 20 wins as a 1 dan.
3 dan	2010	Skipped due to the Taiwan Qiyuan promotion rules.
4 dan	2010	Skipped due to the Taiwan Qiyuan promotion rules.
5 dan	2010	Reached the final of the 1st Bingsheng Cup.
6 dan	2013	Attained 70 wins as a 5 dan.
7 dan	2015	Won the 1st Female Zuiqiang against Zhang Kaixin.

== Filmography ==
Year	Title	Notes
2020	My Missing Valentine (消失的情人節)	
2022	Mama Boy (初戀慢半拍)	
2023	Oh No! Here Comes Trouble (不良執念清除師)	TV series
2024	Mentalese Express	Short Film
