= Park Jieun (Go player) =

South Korean Go player (born 1983)

Personal information
- Native name: 박지은 (Korean); 朴鋕恩 (Korean); Bak Jieun (Revised Romanization); Pak Chiŭn (McCune–Reischauer)
- Born: November 4, 1983 (age 42) South Korea

Sport
- Rank: 9 dan

Park Jieun (born November 4, 1983) is a South Korean professional Go player of 9-dan rank. In 2008, she became the third female go player in history to achieve 9-dan rank, following Rui Naiwei and Feng Yun.

== Career ==
Park became a professional Go player in 1997. She studied Go under Kim Dong-yeop.

In 2008, she won an international women's title in the Sino-Ocean Cup (Chinese: 远洋地产杯), a tournament held one time only. She defeated Rui Naiwei in the finals to win the championship. Under the Korea Baduk Association's rules, she was promoted to 9 dan for the victory, becoming the first Korean female 9 dan professional.

She won the Bingsheng Cup in 2010, and again in 2011.

In 2017, she became the first Korean female professional Go player to reach 1000 career games played.
