= Asami Ueno =

Japanese Go player (born 2001)

Personal information
- Native name: 上野愛咲美 (Japanese)
- Born: 26 October 2001 (age 24) Nakano, Tokyo, Japan

Sport
- Teacher: Kazunari Fujisawa
- Rank: 6 dan
- Affiliation: Nihon Ki-in
Medal record
Women's Go
Representing Japan
Asian Games
Bronze medal – third place	2022 Hangzhou	Women's team

Asami Ueno (上野愛咲美, Ueno Asami), born 26 October 2001, is a Japanese professional Go player at Nihon Ki-in since 2016.

Risa Ueno, who became a professional Go player in April 2019, is her younger sister.

== Achievements ==
Year	Notes
2018	Defeated Xie Yimin and obtained the Women's Kisei title (女流棋聖). She became the youngest player to obtain this title. Due to this record, she was promoted to 2 dan and received the rookie award (棋道賞新人賞).
2019	Defeated Rina Fujisawa and defended the Women's Kisei title. She also defeated her again and obtained the Women's Honinbo (女流本因坊) title. In addition, she became the finalist of the Dragon Star tournament (竜星戦). This is a new record than any other female player could not accomplish. Due to this achievement, a press conference was held at the Japan National Press Club (JNPC). She became the first Go player and the youngest person to do so.
2020	Won the 5th Saikyo. Runner-up for the Women's Honinbo.
2021	Won the Women's Kisei, and the Wakagoi youth tournament. Runner-up in Shinjin O.
2022	Won the Women's Kisei, and the Aidu Chuo Hospital Cup. She also won the Senko Cup, becoming the first Japanese woman to win an international women's tournament. She received the Shusai Prize in recognition of the most outstanding and promising player of the previous year, the first time a woman received it.
2023	Won the Women's Meijin, and the Aidu Chuo Hospital Cup. She also won the Shinjin O, becoming the first woman to win this title.
2024	Won the Aidu Chuo Hospital Cup, and the Wu Qingyuan Cup (first Japanese winner). Runner-up for the Women's Meijin, the Huang Longshi Shuang Deng Cup, and the Woman Strongest. Scored most professional wins in Japan.
2025	Won the Women's Meijin and the Aidu Chuo Hospital Cup.
