= Chiaki Mukai (Go player) =

Japanese Go player

Personal information
- Native name: 向井千瑛 (Japanese)
- Full name: Chiaki Mukai
- Born: 24 December 1987 (age 38) Tokyo, Japan

Sport
- Turned pro: 2004
- Rank: 6 dan
- Affiliation: Nihon Ki-in

Chiaki Mukai (向井千瑛, Mukai Chiaki; born 24 December 1987) is a Japanese professional 6-dan Go player. She is a disciple of Honda Sachiko.
