= List of Asian Games medalists in go =

This is the complete list of Asian Games medalists in go from 2010 to 2022.

== Events ==
=== Men's individual ===
| Games | Gold | Silver | Bronze |
|---|---|---|---|
| 2022 Hangzhou | Hsu Hao-hung (TPE) | Ke Jie (CHN) | Shin Jin-seo (KOR) |

=== Men's team ===
| Games | Gold | Silver | Bronze |
|---|---|---|---|
| 2010 Guangzhou | South Korea (KOR); Lee Chang-ho; Kang Dong-yun; Lee Se-dol; Cho Han-seung; Park Jeong-hwan; Choi Cheol-han | China (CHN); Chang Hao; Gu Li; Liu Xing; Kong Jie; Xie He; Zhou Ruiyang | Japan (JPN); Keigo Yamashita; Yuta Iyama; Shinji Takao; Satoshi Yuki; Kimio Yamada; Jiro Akiyama |
| 2022 Hangzhou | South Korea (KOR); Byun Sang-il; Kim Myung-hun; Park Jeong-hwan; Shin Jin-seo; Shin Min-jun; Lee Ji-hyun | China (CHN); Li Qincheng; Zhao Chenyu; Mi Yuting; Yang Dingxin; Ke Jie; Yang Kaiwen | Japan (JPN); Kotaro Seki; Toramaru Shibano; Ryo Ichiriki; Atsushi Sada; Yuta Iyama |

=== Women's team ===
| Games | Gold | Silver | Bronze |
|---|---|---|---|
| 2010 Guangzhou | South Korea (KOR); Lee Min-jin; Kim Yoon-yeong; Cho Hye-yeon; Lee Seul-a | China (CHN); Wang Chenxing; Rui Naiwei; Song Ronghui; Tang Yi | Chinese Taipei (TPE); Hsieh Yi-min; Joanne Missingham; Chang Cheng-ping; Wang Jing-yi |
| 2022 Hangzhou | China (CHN); Wu Yiming; Yu Zhiying; Li He; Wang Yubo | South Korea (KOR); Kim Eun-ji; Oh Yu-jin; Choi Jeong; Kim Chae-young | Japan (JPN); Asami Ueno; Risa Ueno; Rina Fujisawa |

=== Mixed pair ===
| Games | Gold | Silver | Bronze |
|---|---|---|---|
| 2010 Guangzhou | South Korea (KOR); Park Jeong-hwan; Lee Seul-a | China (CHN); Xie He; Song Ronghui | South Korea (KOR); Choi Cheol-han; Kim Yoon-yeong |
