= Nongshim Cup =

International Go tournament

The Nongshim Cup is a Go competition played between three teams representing China, Japan, and South Korea. The competition was created in 1999 and is held annually. It is officially named the Nongshim Shin Ramyun Cup World Baduk Championship, and sponsored by Nongshim, a South Korean food company.

== Format and rules ==
Each team consists of five players. On each day of competition, a single game is played. After each game, the losing player is eliminated and the winning player continues to the next game. The last team with players remaining wins the competition.

The scheduling of the games is divided into three stages in different locations. Four games are played in the first stage, five games in the second stage, and up to five games (as necessary) in the third stage.

The winning team's prize is 500 million Korean won (approximately $340,000 USD), raised in 2016 from the previous 200 million Korean won. Players receive a 3 million won match fee for each game played. Players with a winning streak of at least 3 games also receive a 10 million won prize for each win beginning with the third.

== Past winners ==
Edition	Year	Winner	Runner-Up	Third Place
1st	1999–2000	South Korea 6–4	China 4–5	Japan 4–5
2nd	2000–2001	South Korea 7–4	Japan 4–5	China 3–5
3rd	2001–2002	South Korea 6–4	China 7–5	Japan 1–5
4th	2002–2003	South Korea 6–4	China 6–5	Japan 2–5
5th	2003–2004	South Korea 5–4	Japan 6–5	China 3–5
6th	2004–2005	South Korea 6–4	China 4–5	Japan 4–5
7th	2005–2006	Japan 6–4	South Korea 5–5	China 3–5
8th	2006–2007	South Korea 6–4	China 6–5	Japan 2–5
9th	2007–2008	China 7–3	South Korea 4–5	Japan 2–5
10th	2008–2009	South Korea 7–3	China 5–5	Japan 1–5
11th	2009–2010	South Korea 6–4	China 6–5	Japan 2–5
12th	2010–2011	South Korea 7–3	China 4–5	Japan 2–5
13th	2011–2012	China 8–4	South Korea 6–5	Japan 0–5
14th	2012–2013	South Korea 6–4	China 7–5	Japan 1–5
15th	2013–2014	China 8–4	South Korea 5–5	Japan 1–5
16th	2014–2015	China 6–3	South Korea 4–5	Japan 3–5
17th	2015–2016	China 5–4	South Korea 5–5	Japan 4–5
18th	2016–2017	China 8–1	South Korea 2–5	Japan 1–5
19th	2017–2018	South Korea 8–3	China 5–5	Japan 0–5
20th	2018–2019	China 8–1	South Korea 2–5	Japan 1–5
21st	2019–2020	China 8–4	South Korea 5–5	Japan 1–5
22nd	2020–2021	South Korea 7–3	China 4–5	Japan 2–5
23rd	2021–2022	South Korea 6–4	Japan 5–5	China 3–5
24th	2022–2023	South Korea 7–4	China 6–5	Japan 1–5
25th	2023–2024	South Korea 6–4	China 7–5	Japan 1–5
26th	2024–2025	South Korea 7–4	China 6–5	Japan 1–5
27th	2025–2026	South Korea 6–4	Japan 4–5	China 4–5

=== By nation ===
Nation	Winners	Runners-up
South Korea	18	9
China	8	14
Japan	1	4

== Detailed results ==
=== 18th Nongshim Cup (2016–2017) ===
No.	Date	Winner	Loser
1	2016-09-27	(Japan) Ichiriki Ryo	(South Korea) Lee Sedol
2	2016-09-28	(China) Fan Tingyu	(Japan) Ichiriki Ryo
3	2016-09-29	(China) Fan Tingyu	(South Korea) Lee Dong-hoon
4	2016-09-30	(China) Fan Tingyu	(Japan) Cho U
5	2016-11-25	(China) Fan Tingyu	(South Korea) Kang Dong-yun
6	2016-11-26	(China) Fan Tingyu	(Japan) Kono Rin
7	2016-11-27	(China) Fan Tingyu	(South Korea) Kim Ji-seok
8	2016-11-28	(China) Fan Tingyu	(Japan) Murakawa Daisuke
9	2016-11-29	(South Korea) Park Junghwan	(China) Fan Tingyu
10	2017-02-21	(South Korea) Park Junghwan	(Japan) Iyama Yuta
11	2017-02-22	(China) Fan Yunruo	(South Korea) Park Junghwan

Members of the winning team who did not need to play: (China) Ke Jie, (China) Tuo Jiaxi, (China) Lian Xiao

=== 19th Nongshim Cup (2017–2018) ===
No.	Date	Winner	Loser
1	2017-09-19	(South Korea) Shin Min-jun	(China) Fan Tingyu
2	2017-09-20	(South Korea) Shin Min-jun	(Japan) Yu Zhengqi
3	2017-09-21	(South Korea) Shin Min-jun	(China) Zhou Ruiyang
4	2017-09-22	(South Korea) Shin Min-jun	(Japan) Hsu Chia-yuan
5	2017-11-24	(South Korea) Shin Min-jun	(China) Chen Yaoye
6	2017-11-25	(South Korea) Shin Min-jun	(Japan) Yamashita Keigo
7	2017-11-26	(China) Dang Yifei	(South Korea) Shin Min-jun
8	2017-11-27	(China) Dang Yifei	(Japan) Ichiriki Ryo
9	2017-11-28	(China) Dang Yifei	(South Korea) Kim Myeong-hoon
10	2018-02-26	(China) Dang Yifei	(Japan) Iyama Yuta
11	2018-02-27	(China) Dang Yifei	(South Korea) Shin Jin-seo
12	2018-02-28	(South Korea) Kim Ji-seok	(China) Dang Yifei
13	2018-03-01	(South Korea) Kim Ji-seok	(China) Ke Jie

Members of the winning team who did not need to play: (South Korea) Park Junghwan

=== 20th Nongshim Cup (2018–2019) ===
No.	Date	Winner	Loser
1	2018-10-16	(Japan) Shibano Toramaru	(South Korea) An Guk-hyeon
2	2018-10-17	(China) Fan Tingyu	(Japan) Shibano Toramaru
3	2018-10-18	(China) Fan Tingyu	(South Korea) Shin Min-jun
4	2018-10-19	(China) Fan Tingyu	(Japan) Motoki Katsuya
5	2018-11-23	(China) Fan Tingyu	(South Korea) Choi Cheol-han
6	2018-11-24	(China) Fan Tingyu	(Japan) Hsu Chia-yuan
7	2018-11-25	(China) Fan Tingyu	(South Korea) Lee Sedol
8	2018-11-26	(China) Fan Tingyu	(Japan) Ichiriki Ryo
9	2018-11-27	(South Korea) Park Junghwan	(China) Fan Tingyu
10	2019-02-18	(South Korea) Park Junghwan	(Japan) Iyama Yuta
11	2019-02-19	(China) Dang Yifei	(South Korea) Park Junghwan

Members of the winning team who did not need to play: (China) Shi Yue, (China) Gu Zihao, (China) Ke Jie

=== 21st Nongshim Cup (2019–2020) ===
No.	Date	Winner	Loser
1	2019-10-15	(South Korea) Won Seong-jin	(Japan) Murakawa Daisuke
2	2019-10-16	(China) Yang Dingxin	(South Korea) Won Seong-jin
3	2019-10-17	(China) Yang Dingxin	(Japan) Yamashita Keigo
4	2019-10-18	(China) Yang Dingxin	(South Korea) Kim Ji-seok
5	2019-11-22	(China) Yang Dingxin	(Japan) Ichiriki Ryo
6	2019-11-23	(China) Yang Dingxin	(South Korea) Lee Dong-hoon
7	2019-11-24	(China) Yang Dingxin	(Japan) Hsu Chia-yuan
8	2019-11-25	(China) Yang Dingxin	(South Korea) Shin Jin-seo
9	2019-11-26	(Japan) Iyama Yuta	(China) Yang Dingxin
10	2020-08-18	(South Korea) Park Junghwan	(Japan) Iyama Yuta
11	2020-08-19	(South Korea) Park Junghwan	(China) Mi Yuting
12	2020-08-21 (Note: The game between Park Junghwan and Fan Tingyu ended in no result because of a technical issue. Park had clicked his mouse to play, but the stone was not placed, and he ran out of time. Officials declared a rematch for the following day, which Park won.)	(South Korea) Park Junghwan	(China) Fan Tingyu
13	2020-08-21	(South Korea) Park Junghwan	(China) Xie Erhao
14	2020-08-22	(China) Ke Jie	(South Korea) Park Junghwan

=== 22nd Nongshim Cup (2020–2021) ===
No.	Date	Winner	Loser
1	2020-10-13	(South Korea) Hong Ki-pyo	(China) Fan Tingyu
2	2020-10-14	(Japan) Hsu Chia-yuan	(China) Hong Ki-pyo
3	2020-10-15	(China) Gu Zihao	(Japan) Hsu Chia-yuan
4	2020-10-16	(China) Gu Zihao	(South Korea) Kang Dong-yun
5	2020-11-20	(China) Gu Zihao	(Japan) Murakawa Daisuke
6	2020-11-21	(South Korea) Shin Min-jun	(China) Gu Zihao
7	2020-11-22	(Japan) Shibano Toramaru	(South Korea) Shin Min-jun
8	2020-11-23	(China) Tang Weixing	(Japan) Shibano Toramaru
9	2020-11-24	(South Korea) Shin Jin-seo	(China) Tang Weixing
10	2021-02-22	(South Korea) Shin Jin-seo	(Japan) Iyama Yuta
11	2021-02-23	(South Korea) Shin Jin-seo	(China) Yang Dingxin
12	2021-02-24	(South Korea) Shin Jin-seo	(Japan) Ichiriki Ryo
13	2021-02-25	(South Korea) Shin Jin-seo	(China) Ke Jie

Members of the winning team who did not need to play: (South Korea) Park Junghwan

=== 23rd Nongshim Cup (2021–2022) ===
No.	Date	Winner	Loser
1	2021-10-11	(South Korea) Won Seong-jin	(Japan) Shibano Toramaru
2	2021-10-12	(China) Li Weiqing	(South Korea) Won Seong-jin
3	2021-10-13	(Japan) Hsu Chia-yuan	(China) Li Weiqing
4	2021-10-14	(South Korea) Park Junghwan	(Japan) Hsu Chia-yuan
5	2021-11-26	(China) Fan Tingyu	(South Korea) Park Junghwan
6	2021-11-27	(Japan) Iyama Yuta	(China) Fan Tingyu
7	2021-11-28	(Japan) Iyama Yuta	(South Korea) Byun Sang-il
8	2021-11-29	(Japan) Iyama Yuta	(China) Li Qincheng
9	2021-11-30	(Japan) Iyama Yuta	(South Korea) Shin Min-jun
10	2022-02-21	(China) Mi Yuting	(Japan) Iyama Yuta
11	2022-02-23 (Note: The game between Mi Yuting and Shin Jin-seo ended in no result because of a technical issue (reminiscent of a similar incident in the 21st cup in 2020). Mi had placed a move, but the computer declared that he ran out of time. Officials scheduled a rematch for the following day (February 23), which Shin won.)	(South Korea) Shin Jin-seo	(China) Mi Yuting
12	2022-02-24	(South Korea) Shin Jin-seo	(Japan) Yu Zhengqi
13	2022-02-25	(South Korea) Shin Jin-seo	(China) Ke Jie
14	2022-02-26	(South Korea) Shin Jin-seo	(Japan) Ichiriki Ryo

=== 24th Nongshim Cup (2022–2023) ===
No.	Date	Winner	Loser
1	2022-10-11	(China) Fan Tingyu	(Japan) Ichiriki Ryo
2	2022-10-12	(China) Fan Tingyu	(South Korea) Shin Min-jun
3	2022-10-13	(China) Fan Tingyu	(Japan) Hsu Chia-yuan
4	2022-10-14	(South Korea) Kang Dong-yun	(China) Fan Tingyu
5	2022-11-25	(South Korea) Kang Dong-yun	(Japan) Shibano Toramaru
6	2022-11-26	(South Korea) Kang Dong-yun	(China) Tuo Jiaxi
7	2022-11-27	(South Korea) Kang Dong-yun	(Japan) Yu Zhengqi
8	2022-11-28	(China) Lian Xiao	(South Korea) Kang Dong-yun
9	2022-11-29	(Japan) Iyama Yuta	(China) Lian Xiao
10	2023-02-20	(South Korea) Park Junghwan	(Japan) Iyama Yuta
11	2023-02-21	(South Korea) Park Junghwan	(China) Ke Jie
12	2023-02-22	(China) Gu Zihao	(South Korea) Park Junghwan
13	2023-02-23	(China) Gu Zihao	(South Korea) Byun Sang-il
14	2023-02-24	(South Korea) Shin Jin-seo	(China) Gu Zihao

=== 25th Nongshim Cup (2023–2024) ===
Games 1–4 were played in Beijing, games 5–9 in Busan, and games 10–14 in Shanghai.

Shin Jinseo's six wins and zero losses was the longest-ever winning streak to finish the competition. He also extended his Nongshim Cup winning streak to 16–0 across four Nongshim Cups beginning in 2020, breaking the previous record of 14–0 set by Lee Changho across six tournaments.

No.	Date	Winner	Loser
1	2023-10-17	(Japan) Hsu Chia-yuan	(South Korea) Seol Hyunjun
2	2023-10-18	(China) Xie Erhao	(Japan) Hsu Chia-yuan
3	2023-10-19	(China) Xie Erhao	(South Korea) Byun Sang-il
4	2023-10-20	(China) Xie Erhao	(Japan) Shibano Toramaru
5	2023-11-30	(China) Xie Erhao	(South Korea) Won Seong-jin
6	2023-12-01	(China) Xie Erhao	(Japan) Ichiriki Ryo
7	2023-12-02	(China) Xie Erhao	(South Korea) Park Junghwan
8	2023-12-03	(China) Xie Erhao	(Japan) Yu Zhengqi
9	2023-12-04	(South Korea) Shin Jin-seo	(China) Xie Erhao
10	2024-02-19	(South Korea) Shin Jin-seo	(Japan) Iyama Yuta
11	2024-02-20	(South Korea) Shin Jin-seo	(China) Zhao Chenyu
12	2024-02-21	(South Korea) Shin Jin-seo	(China) Ke Jie
13	2024-02-22	(South Korea) Shin Jin-seo	(China) Ding Hao
14	2024-02-23	(South Korea) Shin Jin-seo	(China) Gu Zihao

=== 26th Nongshim Cup (2024–2025) ===
No.	Date	Winner	Loser
1	2024-09-05	(China) Ke Jie	(South Korea) Seol Hyunjun
2	2024-09-06	(China) Ke Jie	(Japan) Hirose Yuichi
3	2024-09-07	(South Korea) Kim Myeong-hoon	(China) Ke Jie
4	2024-09-08	(South Korea) Kim Myeong-hoon	(Japan) Iyama Yuta
5	2024-11-30	(South Korea) Kim Myeong-hoon	(China) Fan Tingyu
6	2024-12-01	(South Korea) Kim Myeong-hoon	(Japan) Hsu Chia-yuan
7	2024-12-02	(China) Xie Erhao	(South Korea) Kim Myeong-hoon
8	2024-12-03	(China) Xie Erhao	(Japan) Ichiriki Ryo
9	2024-12-04	(China) Xie Erhao	(South Korea) Shin Min-jun
10	2025-02-17	(Japan) Shibano Toramaru	(China) Xie Erhao
11	2025-02-18	(South Korea) Park Junghwan	(Japan) Shibano Toramaru
12	2025-02-19	(China) Li Xuanhao	(South Korea) Park Junghwan
13	2025-02-20	(South Korea) Shin Jinseo	(China) Li Xuanhao
14	2025-02-21	(South Korea) Shin Jinseo	(China) Ding Hao

=== 27th Nongshim Cup (2025–2026) ===
No.	Date	Winner	Loser
1	2025-09-03	(South Korea) Lee Ji-hyeon	(China) Li Qincheng
2	2025-09-04	(South Korea) Lee Ji-hyeon	(Japan) Fukuoka Kotaro
3	2025-09-05	(China) Tan Xiao	(South Korea) Lee Ji-hyeon
4	2025-09-06	(China) Tan Xiao	(Japan) Hsu Chia-yuan
5	2025-11-21	(South Korea) Kang Dongyun	(China) Tan Xiao
6	2025-11-22	(Japan) Shibano Toramaru	(South Korea) Kang Dongyun
7	2025-11-23	(China) Yang Kaiwen	(Japan) Shibano Toramaru
8	2025-11-24	(China) Yang Kaiwen	(South Korea) An Seong-jun
9	2025-11-25	(Japan) Iyama Yuta	(China) Yang Kaiwen
10	2026-02-02	(Japan) Iyama Yuta	(South Korea) Park Junghwan
11	2026-02-03	(Japan) Iyama Yuta	(China) Ding Hao
12	2026-02-04	(South Korea) Shin Jinseo	(Japan) Iyama Yuta
13	2026-02-05	(South Korea) Shin Jinseo	(China) Wang Xinghao
14	2026-02-06	(South Korea) Shin Jinseo	(Japan) Ichiriki Ryo
