= Byun Sang-il =

South Korean Go player (born 1997)

Personal information
- Native name: 변상일 (Korean); 卞相壹 (Korean); Byeon Sangil (Revised Romanization)
- Born: 14 January 1997 (age 29) South Korea
- Height: 1.74 m (5 ft 9 in)

Sport
- Turned pro: 2012
- Rank: 9 dan
- Affiliation: Korea Baduk Association
Medal record
Men's Go
Representing South Korea
Asian Games
Gold medal – first place	2022 Hangzhou	Men's team

Byun Sang-il (Korean: 변상일; born 14 January 1997) is a South Korean professional Go player.

== Career ==
Byun Sang-il was born in Jinju, South Gyeongsang Province. He studied Go with local 9-dan professional Moon Myeong-geun, before moving to Seoul in 2007 to further pursue Go. There, he first went to Lee Sedol's baduk dojang, and later Golden Bell Baduk Dojang. He earned professional 1 dan rank in January 2012, when he was 15 years old.

In 2018, he led his team Posco Chemtech to win the Korean Baduk League, and was named league MVP. His record was 10 wins and 4 losses in his regular league games and 2 postseason wins.

He won the Guksu Mountains International Baduk Championship in 2021, defeating Shin Jinseo in the final round. He also won the Crown Haitai Cup in 2022, a tournament for players under 25.

He won a major international championship in the Chunlan Cup in July 2023, with a 2–0 victory over Chinese player Li Xuanhao in the finals. Later that same month, he won Korea's GS Caltex Cup for the first time, after having been the runner-up the previous two years.

His highest ranking has been number two in the Korea Baduk Association's official rankings of Korean players, which he first reached in 2022. He is currently number three among Korean players.

=== 2025 LG Cup controversy ===
Byun won his second major international tournament title in the 29th LG Cup World Baduk Championship in January 2025, becoming the first player in the history of Go world championships to claim the title without winning an actual on-board game, with the outcome decided entirely by referee rulings.

Byun was declared the winner of the best-of-three final in an unprecedented event after his opponent Ke Jie was disqualified in game 2 for rule violations and forfeited in game 3 due to a dispute over the timing of the penalty for another similar rule violation. A significant controversy in the tournament was around the enforcement of the rule violated by Ke Jie, which was introduced by the Korea Baduk Association in November 2024, well after the LG Cup had already commenced in May. The change in rules midway through the tournament sparked debate, with critics arguing that it violates sports conventions and renders the final's penalties questionable. The rule required players to place captured stones on the bowl lid, to keep track of them as an aid to counting the score. Reflecting differences in scoring systems, there is no such rule in China, where players might set captured stones aside anywhere near the board or put the stones back into their opponent's bowl. Therefore, Chinese players have struggled to adapt to this change in Korean rules.

During the second game of the LG Cup final, Ke Jie violated the rules twice. The first violation resulted in a two-point penalty and a warning. Later in the game, Ke Jie again failed to place a captured stone on the bowl lid, prompting an objection from Byun Sang-il. As per the rules, Ke Jie was penalized for the second violation with an immediate loss. This marked the first instance in the history of the Go World Championship final where a game was terminated due to a player's rule violation.Some players expressed shock and anger at Byun's act of reporting his opponent over the trivial matter, stating that his actions "tarnished the image upheld by the predecessors of Go."

In the third game the next day, Ke Jie failed to immediately place two captured stones on the bowl lid after capturing them. Ke Jie and the Chinese side objected to the referee's handling of the situation, because the referee paused the game after several moves had already been played, at a time during Byun's turn, which gave him additional thinking time. Ke Jie said that the referees had repeatedly paused the games during Byun's turns over the games in the final. Ke Jie informed the referee that he did not oppose the penalty but requested that the game be resumed immediately and paused only after Byun had made his move. However, the referee dismissed the request, which, from Ke Jie's perspective, made it seem as if the referee was extending the pause time to give Byun additional time and his actions have already affected the outcome of the game. (According to the Chinese Go rules about suspending games and sealing moves as well as the Adjournment rule of GO, the player who has made their move should immediately leave the playing area. The player whose turn it is must think and record the point where they plan to play on a designated piece of paper, which is then sealed and handed to the referee. When the game resumes, the referee opens the sealed paper and makes the move at the marked location, and the game proceeds. The new Korean Go rules do not provide detailed regulations on this matter.) Ke Jie considered the ruling unfair, refused to accept it, and demanded a replay. No agreement was reached after two hours, and Ke Jie left the venue, resulting in a loss by default. This marked the first time in the history of the Go World Championship final that a game was terminated due to a player's resignation. The Chinese Weiqi Association released a statement saying that they do not accept the outcome of the third game.

During the LG Cup award ceremony, Byun stated: "The game ended in an unpleasant manner, which made me feel very uncomfortable. I completely understand Ke Jie's position." He also told reporters that he was unaware of the rule before the referee announced Ke Jie's violation for failing to properly handle captured stones. Byun further expressed his belief that the rule is unnecessary, as it does not affect the outcome of the game.

== International competitions ==
Competitions	2014	2015	2016	2017	2018	2019	2020	2021	2022	2023	2024	2025	2026
Ing Cup	-		×	-			R32	-			×	-	
Samsung Cup	×	QF	R16	×	×	R32	R16	R32	SF	R32	R32	R32	W
LG Cup	R16	R32	×	R32	R32	R16	SF	QF	R16	RU	W	SF	QF
Mlily Cup	-	R32	-	×	-	R16	-			R32	-		×
Chunlan Cup	×	-	×	-	×	-	QF	-	W	-	SF	-	R24
Kuksu Mountains	-				×	SF	-	W	RU	SF	SF	SF	R16
Lanke Cup	-									R16	QF	R32	RU
Nanyang Cup	-										QF	-	
Shinhan Cup	-											R32	
Bailing Cup	×	-	R32	-	QF	-							
Xin'ao Cup	-			R32	-								
Nongshim Cup	0:1	×	×	×	×	×	×	0:1	0:1	0:1	×	×	

(W) Winner; (RU) Runner-up; (SF) Semifinalist; (QF) Quarterfinalist; (R16) Round of 16; (R24) Round of 24; (R32) Round of 32; (R64) Round of 64.

- Note 1: Some competitions last for more than one year. Usually the beginning year of the competition is recorded as the year of competition.
- Note 2: The light green background indicates that the player is still competing in the competition.
- Note 3: '×' means the player did not participate (or lost in the qualification round), while '-' means the competition was not held in that year.
- Note 4: The result of Nongshim Cup means the result of the player (matches won : matches lost). The result '0:0' means the player qualified for his/her national team of Nongshim Cup, and the team won before the player compete in the cup.
