= Globis Cup =

International under-20 Go competition

The Globis Cup is an international Go competition for players under the age of 20. The tournament was created in 2014 and is held annually (except in 2024 and 2025). It is organized by the Nihon Ki-in and sponsored by Globis, a Japanese company.

== Rules ==
From the 1st to the 10th Globis Cup (2014–2023), the Globis Cup was an under-20 Go competition, with 16 players in total from China, Japan, South Korea, Chinese Taipei, Europe, North America, and other Asian countries or Oceania. Players were required to be under 20 years old on January 1 of the year of the tournament (and may turn 20 by the time the event is actually held). Each player had 30 seconds per move, along with 10 one-minute periods of extra thinking time, which is like the NHK Cup.

Following a hiatus in 2024 and 2025, the 11th Globis Cup returned in 2026 as an under-22 Go competition. China did not participate in this event.

From the 1st to the 6th cup, the winner received 3,000,000 yen in prize money, the runner-up received 500,000 yen, and third place received 200,000 yen. From the 7th cup to the 10th cup, these prizes were 1,500,000 yen, 250,000 yen, and 100,000 yen, respectively. In the 11th cup, these prizes returned to the original 3,000,000 yen, 500,000 yen, and 200,000 yen, respectively.

== Winners and runners-up ==
Globis Cup
Edition	Year	Winner	Runner-up
1st	2014	(Japan) Ichiriki Ryo	(Japan) Hsu Chia-yuan
2nd	2015	(China) Huang Yunsong	(South Korea) Na Hyeon
3rd	2016	(China) Li Qincheng	(Japan) Hsu Chia-yuan
4th	2017	(South Korea) Shin Jin-seo	(South Korea) Byun Sang-il
5th	2018	(China) Xu Jiayang	(South Korea) Shin Min-jun
6th	2019	(South Korea) Shin Min-jun	(China) Wang Zejin
7th	2020	(South Korea) Moon Min-jong	(China) Li Weiqing
8th	2021	(China) Wang Xinghao	(China) Tu Xiaoyu
9th	2022	(China) Wang Xinghao	(Japan) Fukuoka Kotaro
10th	2023	(South Korea) Han Woo-jin	(China) Wang Xinghao
11th	2026	(South Korea) Kim Seung-gu	(South Korea) Kwon Hyo-jin
