= Go at the 2022 Asian Games =

- Venue: Hangzhou Chess Academy
- Dates: 24 September – 3 October 2023
- Competitors: 83 from 10 nations

Go at the 2022 Asian Games was held in Hangzhou Chess Academy also known as Hangzhou Qiyuan (Zhili) Chess Hall, Hangzhou, China, from 24 September to 3 October 2023.

Competitors from China, Hong Kong, Japan, South Korea, Macau, Malaysia, Mongolia, Chinese Taipei, Thailand and Singapore were taking part in this sport across the three events.

== Schedule ==
●	Round	¼	Quarterfinals	S	Semifinals	F	Finals

Event↓/Date →	24th Sun	25th Mon	26th Tue	27th Wed	28th Thu		29th Fri	30th Sat	1st Sun	2rd Mon	3th Tue
Men's individual	●●	●●	●●	¼	½	F					
Men's team							●●	●●	●●	½	F
Women's team							●●	●●	●	½	F

== Medalists ==
Event	Gold	Silver	Bronze
Men's individual	Hsu Hao-hung; Chinese Taipei	Ke Jie; China	Shin Jin-seo; South Korea
Men's team	South Korea; Byun Sang-il; Kim Myung-hun; Park Jeong-hwan; Shin Jin-seo; Shin Min-jun; Lee Ji-hyun	China; Li Qincheng; Zhao Chenyu; Mi Yuting; Yang Dingxin; Ke Jie; Yang Kaiwen	Japan; Kotaro Seki; Toramaru Shibano; Ryo Ichiriki; Atsushi Sada; Yuta Iyama
Women's team	China; Wu Yiming; Yu Zhiying; Li He; Wang Yubo	South Korea; Kim Eun-ji; Oh Yu-jin; Choi Jeong; Kim Chae-young	Japan; Asami Ueno; Risa Ueno; Rina Fujisawa

== Medal table ==
Rank	Nation	Gold	Silver	Bronze	Total
1	China (CHN)	1	2	0	3
2	South Korea (KOR)	1	1	1	3
3	Chinese Taipei (TPE)	1	0	0	1
4	Japan (JPN)	0	0	2	2
Totals (4 entries)		3	3	3	9

== Participating nations ==
A total of 83 athletes from 10 nations competed in Go at the 2022 Asian Games:

- China (10)
- Chinese Taipei (10)
- Hong Kong (10)
- Japan (8)
- Macau (2)
- Malaysia (10)
- Mongolia (8)
- Singapore (5)
- South Korea (10)
- Thailand (10)
