= Shin Min-jun =

South Korean Go player (born 1999)

Personal information
- Native name: 신민준 (Korean); 申旻埈 (Korean)
- Born: 11 January 1999 (age 27) Seoul, South Korea
- Height: 1.69 m (5 ft 7 in)

Sport
- Turned pro: 2012
- Rank: 9 dan
- Affiliation: Hanguk Kiwon
Medal record
Men's Go
Representing South Korea
Asian Games
Gold medal – first place	2022 Hangzhou	Men's team

Shin Min-jun (Korean: 신민준; born 11 January 1999) is a South Korean professional Go player.

== Biography ==
Shin Min-jun was born in 1999. His father Shin Chang-seok is a television producer-director (PD) of popular KBS dramas.

Shin became a professional player in July 2012. He qualified as a pro in the same tournament as Shin Jinseo; the "two Shins" (Korean: 양신; Hanja: 兩申) have often been compared. He studied Go under Lee Sedol, staying at Lee Sedol's house from March to July 2013.

He won six consecutive games for Korea in the 19th Nongshim Cup (2017–2018). He was finally eliminated in the seventh game by China's Dang Yifei, who went on to win five consecutive games, before Kim Ji-seok won the final two games to clinch the victory for Korea.

In 2018, he took second place in the Globis Cup, an international U-20 tournament in Japan. He finished in the top four in the 23rd LG Cup, after losing in the semifinal to Yang Dingxin. He won the Globis Cup in 2019.

In 2021, he won his first international championship at the 25th LG Cup, with a 2–1 victory in the final over eight-time world champion Ke Jie. He repeated this feat in 2026, winning the 30th LG cup with a 2-1 victory over Ichiriki Ryo. In the same year, he finished runner-up in the 31st LG cup, losing by 2-1 to Wang Xinghao in the finals.

== Titles ==
International:

- Globis Cup 2019 (under-20 tournament)
- LG Cup 2021, 2026
- Guksu Mountains International Baduk Championship 2023

Domestic:

- KBS Cup 2019
- Myeongin 2022
- Crown Haitai Cup 2023
- GS Caltex Cup 2024, 2026
