= Quzhou-Lanke Cup World Go Open =

International Go competition

The Quzhou-Lanke Cup World Go Open (Chinese: "衢州烂柯杯"世界围棋公开赛; pinyin: Qúzhōu lànkē bēi shìjiè wéiqí gōngkāisài) is an international Go tournament. It was created in 2023 and is held annually. The competition is organized by the Chinese Weiqi Association and Quzhou municipal government.

== Rules ==
Games are played under Chinese rules with a 7.5 point komi. Each player has 2 hours of main time with five 60-second byoyomi periods.

The prizes are: 1.8 million Chinese Yuan for champion, 600 thousand yuan for runner-up, 200 thousand yuan for losers of semifinal, 100 thousand yuan for losers of round 3, 50 thousand yuan for losers of round 2, 30 thousand yuan for loser of round 1.

== Winners and runners-up ==
Edition	Year	Winner	Score	Runner-up
1st	2023	(China) Gu Zihao	2–1	(South Korea) Shin Jinseo
2nd	2024	(South Korea) Shin Jinseo	2–0	(China) Gu Zihao
3rd	2025	(China) Dang Yifei	2–1	(South Korea) Shin Jinseo
4th	2026	(South Korea) Shin Jinseo	2–0	(South Korea) Byun Sang-il

== 1st Lanke Cup World Go Open (2023) ==
Round of 32
May 5, 2023, Quzhou, Zhejiang
Gu Zihao 9p (China)	1
Han Seungjoo 9p (South Korea)	0
Park Junghwan 9p (South Korea)	1
Zhao Chenyu 9p (China)	0
An Sungjoon 9p (South Korea)	1
Yu Zhengqi 8p (Japan)	0
Tao Xinran 9p (China)	1
Kang Dong-yun 9p (South Korea)	0
Park Geunho 6p (South Korea)	1
Cao Xiaoyang 5p (China)	0
Xie Erhao 9p (China)	1
Yuta Iyama 9p (Japan)	0
Wang Xinghao 8p (China)	1
Ida Atsushi 9p (Japan)	0
Byun Sangil 9p (South Korea)	1
Tang Weixing 9p (China)	0
Shin Jin-seo 9p (South Korea)	1
Li Qincheng 9p (China)	0
Ding Hao 9p (China)	1
Xu Haohong 9p (Chinese Taipei)	0
Li Weiqing 9p (China)	1
Alexander Qi 1p (United States)	0
Jiang Weijie 9p (China)	1
Ali Jabarin 2p (Europe)	0
Tan Xiao 9p (China)	1
Hsu Chia-yuan 9p (Japan)	0
Lai Junfu 8p (Chinese Taipei)	1
Ke Jie 9p (China)	0
Lian Xiao 9p (China)	1
Seki Kotaro 9p (Japan)	0
Li Xuanhao 9p (China)	1
Won Seongjin 9p (South Korea)	0

Round of 16
May 6
Gu Zihao (China)	1
Park Junghwan (South Korea)	0
An Sungjoon (South Korea)	1
Tao Xinran (China)	0
Park Geunho (South Korea)	1
Xie Erhao (China)	0
Wang Xinghao (China)	1
Byun Sangil (South Korea)	0
Shin Jin-seo (South Korea)	1
Ding Hao (China)	0
Li Weiqing (China)	1
Jiang Weijie (China)	0
Tan Xiao (China)	1
Lai Junfu (Chinese Taipei)	0
Lian Xiao (China)	1
Li Xuanhao (China)	0

Quarter-finals
May 8
Gu Zihao (China)	1
An Sungjoon (South Korea)	0
Park Geunho (South Korea)	1
Wang Xinghao (China)	0
Shin Jin-seo (South Korea)	1
Li Weiqing (China)	0
Tan Xiao (China)	1
Lian Xiao (China)	0

Semi-finals
May 9
Gu Zihao (China)	1
Park Geunho (South Korea)	0
Shin Jin-seo (South Korea)	1
Tan Xiao (China)	0

Final
June 14–17
Gu Zihao (China)	2
Shin Jin-seo (South Korea)	1
