= Liguang Xinxiu Cup =

The Liguang Xinxiu Cup (Chinese: 理光杯新秀赛; pinyin: Lǐguāng Bēi Xīnxiù Sài), or Ricoh Xinxiu Cup, is a Go competition in China.

== Outline ==
The tournament is sponsored by Ricoh of Hong Kong and is the youth version of the Ricoh Cup.

== Past Winners and Runners-up ==
Year	Winner	Runner-up
2007	Wu Guangya	Yin Hang
2008	Jiang Weijie	Wang Wei
2009	Mi Yuting	Zhou Hexi
2010	Lian Xiao	Li Haojie
2011	Yang Dingxin	Fan Tingyu
2012	Li Xuanhao	Yang Dingxin
2013	Li Qincheng	Huang Yunsong
2014	Huang Yunsong	Ma Yichao
