= Cao Dayuan =

Chinese Go player (born 1962)

Personal information
- Native name: 曹大元 (Chinese); Cáo Dàyuán (Pinyin)
- Full name: Cao Dayuan
- Born: January 26, 1962 (age 64) Shanghai, China

Sport
- Turned pro: 1985 (full time)
- Teacher: Qiu Bairui
- Pupil: Xie He, Fan Tingyu
- Rank: 9 dan
- Affiliation: Zhongguo Qiyuan

Cáo Dàyuán (Chinese: 曹大元; born January 26, 1962) is a professional Go player.

== Biography ==
Cao started learning Go when he was 11. He won the 4th World Amateur Go Championship in 1982 and turned professional in 1985. He was promoted to 9 dan in 1986.

== Titles & runners-up ==
Ranks #10 in total number of titles in China.

Title	Years Held
Current	5
NEC Cup (China)	1996
(China) CCTV Cup	1996, 1998
(China) National Go Individual	1994
(China) New Sports Cup	1986

Title	Years Lost
Current	8
(China) Mingren	1993
(China) NEC Cup	1997, 1998
(China) CCTV Cup	1991
(China) New Sports Cup	1981, 1985, 1987, 1990
Defunct	1
(China) Qiwang	1998
Continental	1
(Japan) (South Korea) (China) (Taiwan) Asian TV Cup	1991
