= Weifu Fangkai Cup =

The Weifu Fangkai Cup (Chinese: 威孚房开杯棋王争霸赛; pinyin: Wēifú Fángkāi Bēi Qíwáng Zhēngbàsài), also sometimes known as the Qiwang (not to be confused with the defunct Qiwang), is a Go competition in China.

== Outline ==
The tournament is sponsored by the Wuxi people government. The tournament began in 2003.

== Past winners and runners-up ==
No.	Year	Winner	Runner-up
1	2003	Nie Weiping	Yu Bin
2	2004	Kong Jie	Zhou Heyang
3	2007	Hu Yaoyu	Ma Xiaochun
4	2008	Zhou Ruiyang	Li Kang
5	2009	Kong Jie	Chen Yaoye
6	2010	Gu Lingyi	Peng Liyao
7	2011	Tan Xiao	Wang Lei
8	2012	Peng Liyao	Fan Tingyu
9	2013	Yang Dingxin	Zhou Ruiyang
10	2014	Shi Yue	Jiang Weijie
11	2015	Ke Jie	Fan Yunruo
12	2016	Huang Yunsong	Mi Yuting
13	2017	Fan Yin	Zhang Tao
14	2018	Gu Zihao	Liao Yuanhe
15	2019	Fan Tingyu	Mi Yuting
16	2022	Mi Yuting	Yang Kaiwen
17	2024	Li Qincheng	Xie Ke
18	2025	Ding Hao	Fan Tingyu
19	2026	Wang Xinghao	Liu Yuhang
