= Hsu Hao-hung =

Taiwanese Go player (born 2001)

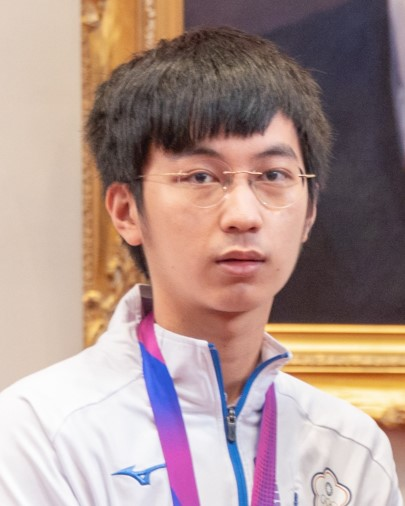

Personal information
- Born: 30 April 2001 (age 25)
- Height: 1.73 m (5 ft 8 in)

Sport
- Turned pro: 2013
- Rank: 9 dan
- Affiliation: Taiwan Qiyuan
Medal record
Men's Go
Representing Chinese Taipei
Asian Games
Gold medal – first place	2022 Hangzhou	Individual

Hsu Hao-hung
- Traditional Chinese: 許皓鋐
- Simplified Chinese: 许皓𬭎
Transcriptions
Standard Mandarin
- Hanyu Pinyin: Xǔ Hàohóng
- Wade–Giles: Hsü^{3} Hao^{4} Hung^{2}

Hsu Hao-hung (Chinese: 許皓鋐; born 30 April 2001) is a Taiwanese professional Go player.

Hsu Hao-hung became a professional 1 dan player of the Taiwan Qiyuan in 2013, at age 11. He has won many domestic Go tournaments in Taiwan. In 2022 he was the winner of a record-setting eight championships, out of a total of nine possible.

Hsu was the gold medalist in the 2022 Asian Games men's individual Go competition (held in September 2023). He defeated Korea's Park Junghwan in the quarterfinals, Korea's Shin Jinseo in the semifinals, and China's Ke Jie in the finals. It was the second time ever that a player representing Taiwan won a major international title, after Chou Chun-hsun's 2007 LG Cup championship.
