= Go at the 2022 Asian Games – Men's team =

Asian Games event

Men's team at the 2022 Asian Games
- Venue: Hangzhou Chess Academy
- Date: 29 September – 3 October 2023
- Competitors: 51 from 9 nations

Medalists
gold medal	South Korea; Byun Sang-il, Kim Myung-hun, Park Jeong-hwan, Shin Jin-seo, Shin Min-jun, Lee Ji-hyun
silver medal	China; Li Qincheng, Zhao Chenyu, Mi Yuting, Yang Dingxin, Ke Jie, Yang Kaiwen
bronze medal	Japan; Kotaro Seki, Toramaru Shibano, Ryo Ichiriki, Atsushi Sada, Yuta Iyama

The men's team competition at the 2022 Asian Games in Hangzhou, China was held from 29 September to 3 October 2023 at Hangzhou Chess Academy. Each player had one hour and 30 seconds byoyomi periods.

== Schedule ==
All times are China Standard Time (UTC+08:00)

Date	Time	Event
Friday, 29 September 2023	09:30	Round 1
Friday, 29 September 2023	15:00	Round 2
Saturday, 30 September 2023	09:30	Round 3
Saturday, 30 September 2023	15:00	Round 4
Sunday, 1 October 2023	09:30	Round 5
Sunday, 1 October 2023	15:00	Round 6
Monday, 2 October 2023	15:00	Semifinals
Tuesday, 3 October 2023	09:30	Bronze medal match
Tuesday, 3 October 2023	15:00	Gold medal match

== Results ==
=== Preliminary round ===
==== Round 1 ====
	Score	
Hong Kong	10–0	Mongolia
Chan Nai San	2–0	Shartolgoin Bayarjargal
Chan Chi Hin	2–0	Byambakhüügiin Battulga
Ho Kwai Cheung	2–0	Gantömöriin Altanzul
Woo Chun Yin	2–0	Nyamjantsangiin Oyuunbaatar
Chan Ka Ho	2–0	Ganbatyn Bold
Malaysia	0–10	Japan
Chang Fu Kang	0–2	Kotaro Seki
Lee Shou Xuan	0–2	Toramaru Shibano
Owen Lo Chen Yeh	0–2	Ryo Ichiriki
Leong Chee Weng	0–2	Atsushi Sada
Lee Shou Wei	0–2	Yuta Iyama
Chinese Taipei	0–10	South Korea
Hsu Hao-hung	0–2	Byun Sang-il
Lai Jyun-fu	0–2	Kim Myung-hun
Lin Chun-yen	0–2	Park Jeong-hwan
Wang Yuan-jyun	0–2	Shin Jin-seo
Hsu Chia-yuan	0–2	Shin Min-jun
Thailand	0–10	China
Vorawat Tanapatsopol	0–2	Li Qincheng
Pongsakarn Sornarra	0–2	Zhao Chenyu
Wichrich Karuehawanit	0–2	Mi Yuting
Krit Jamkachornkiat	0–2	Yang Dingxin
Kamon Santipojana	0–2	Yang Kaiwen
Singapore	0–0	Bye
	0–0	
	0–0	
	0–0	
	0–0	
	0–0	

==== Round 2 ====
	Score	
China	10–0	Singapore
Li Qincheng	2–0	Ho Fei Yang
Zhao Chenyu	2–0	Kwa Jie Hui
Mi Yuting	2–0	Kang Zhanbin
Ke Jie	2–0	Tan Jia Cheng
Yang Kaiwen	2–0	Xi Yue
South Korea	10–0	Hong Kong
Byun Sang-il	2–0	Chan Chi Hin
Kim Myung-hun	2–0	Hollis Ho
Park Jeong-hwan	2–0	Ho Kwai Cheung
Shin Min-jun	2–0	Woo Chun Yin
Lee Ji-hyun	2–0	Chan Ka Ho
Japan	10–0	Thailand
Kotaro Seki	2–0	Vorawat Tanapatsopol
Toramaru Shibano	2–0	Pongsakarn Sornarra
Ryo Ichiriki	2–0	Wichrich Karuehawanit
Atsushi Sada	2–0	Kamon Santipojana
Yuta Iyama	2–0	Pariwat Sampaokaew
Mongolia	0–10	Chinese Taipei
Shartolgoin Bayarjargal	0–2	Lai Jyun-fu
Byambakhüügiin Battulga	0–2	Lin Chun-yen
Gantömöriin Altanzul	0–2	Wang Yuan-jyun
Nyamjantsangiin Oyuunbaatar	0–2	Hsu Chia-yuan
Ganbatyn Bold	0–2	Hsu Ching-en
Bye	0–0	Malaysia
	0–0	
	0–0	
	0–0	
	0–0	
	0–0	

==== Round 3 ====
	Score	
Japan	0–10	South Korea
Kotaro Seki	0–2	Byun Sang-il
Toramaru Shibano	0–2	Kim Myung-hun
Ryo Ichiriki	0–2	Park Jeong-hwan
Atsushi Sada	0–2	Shin Jin-seo
Yuta Iyama	0–2	Shin Min-jun
Hong Kong	0–10	China
Chan Nai San	0–2	Li Qincheng
Hollis Ho	0–2	Zhao Chenyu
Ho Kwai Cheung	0–2	Mi Yuting
Woo Chun Yin	0–2	Yang Dingxin
Chan Ka Ho	0–2	Yang Kaiwen
Malaysia	0–10	Chinese Taipei
Chang Fu Kang	0–2	Hsu Hao-hung
Lee Shou Xuan	0–2	Lin Chun-yen
Lee Shou Kai	0–2	Wang Yuan-jyun
Leong Chee Weng	0–2	Hsu Chia-yuan
Lee Shou Wei	0–2	Hsu Ching-en
Mongolia	0–10	Singapore
Shartolgoin Bayarjargal	0–2	Ho Fei Yang
Byambakhüügiin Battulga	0–2	Kwa Jie Hui
Gantömöriin Altanzul	0–2	Kang Zhanbin
Nyamjantsangiin Oyuunbaatar	0–2	Tan Jia Cheng
Ganbatyn Bold	0–2	Xi Yue
Thailand	0–0	Bye
	0–0	
	0–0	
	0–0	
	0–0	
	0–0	

==== Round 4 ====
	Score	
China	2–8	South Korea
Zhao Chenyu	2–0	Byun Sang-il
Mi Yuting	0–2	Kim Myung-hun
Yang Dingxin	0–2	Park Jeong-hwan
Ke Jie	0–2	Shin Jin-seo
Yang Kaiwen	0–2	Shin Min-jun
Singapore	0–10	Japan
Ho Fei Yang	0–2	Kotaro Seki
Kwa Jie Hui	0–2	Toramaru Shibano
Kang Zhanbin	0–2	Ryo Ichiriki
Tan Jia Cheng	0–2	Atsushi Sada
Xi Yue	0–2	Yuta Iyama
Chinese Taipei	10–0	Thailand
Hsu Hao-hung	2–0	Vorawat Tanapatsopol
Lai Jyun-fu	2–0	Pongsakarn Sornarra
Wang Yuan-jyun	2–0	Wichrich Karuehawanit
Hsu Chia-yuan	2–0	Kamon Santipojana
Hsu Ching-en	2–0	Pariwat Sampaokaew
Malaysia	0–10	Hong Kong
Chang Fu Kang	0–2	Chan Nai San
Owen Lo Chen Yeh	0–2	Chan Chi Hin
Lee Shou Kai	0–2	Hollis Ho
Leong Chee Weng	0–2	Ho Kwai Cheung
Lee Shou Wei	0–2	Woo Chun Yin
Bye	0–0	Mongolia
	0–0	
	0–0	
	0–0	
	0–0	
	0–0	

==== Round 5 ====
	Score	
South Korea	10–0	Singapore
Byun Sang-il	2–0	Ho Fei Yang
Park Jeong-hwan	2–0	Kwa Jie Hui
Shin Jin-seo	2–0	Kang Zhanbin
Shin Min-jun	2–0	Tan Jia Cheng
Lee Ji-hyun	2–0	Xi Yue
Japan	2–8	Chinese Taipei
Kotaro Seki	0–2	Hsu Hao-hung
Toramaru Shibano	0–2	Lai Jyun-fu
Ryo Ichiriki	0–2	Wang Yuan-jyun
Atsushi Sada	0–2	Hsu Chia-yuan
Yuta Iyama	2–0	Hsu Ching-en
China	10–0	Malaysia
Li Qincheng	2–0	Chang Fu Kang
Zhao Chenyu	2–0	Lee Shou Xuan
Mi Yuting	2–0	Owen Lo Chen Yeh
Ke Jie	2–0	Lee Shou Kai
Yang Kaiwen	2–0	Leong Chee Weng
Mongolia	0–10	Thailand
Shartolgoin Bayarjargal	0–2	Vorawat Tanapatsopol
Byambakhüügiin Battulga	0–2	Pongsakarn Sornarra
Gantömöriin Altanzul	0–2	Wichrich Karuehawanit
Nyamjantsangiin Oyuunbaatar	0–2	Krit Jamkachornkiat
Ganbatyn Bold	0–2	Pariwat Sampaokaew
Hong Kong	0–0	Bye
	0–0	
	0–0	
	0–0	
	0–0	
	0–0	

==== Round 6 ====
	Score	
Thailand	0–10	South Korea
Vorawat Tanapatsopol	0–2	Byun Sang-il
Pongsakarn Sornarra	0–2	Kim Myung-hun
Wichrich Karuehawanit	0–2	Shin Jin-seo
Krit Jamkachornkiat	0–2	Shin Min-jun
Kamon Santipojana	0–2	Lee Ji-hyun
Chinese Taipei	2–8	China
Lai Jyun-fu	0–2	Li Qincheng
Lin Chun-yen	2–0	Mi Yuting
Wang Yuan-jyun	0–2	Yang Dingxin
Hsu Chia-yuan	0–2	Ke Jie
Hsu Ching-en	0–2	Yang Kaiwen
Singapore	0–10	Hong Kong
Ho Fei Yang	0–2	Chan Nai San
Kwa Jie Hui	0–2	Chan Chi Hin
Kang Zhanbin	0–2	Hollis Ho
Tan Jia Cheng	0–2	Ho Kwai Cheung
Xi Yue	0–2	Woo Chun Yin
Malaysia	10–0	Mongolia
Lee Shou Xuan	2–0	Shartolgoin Bayarjargal
Owen Lo Chen Yeh	2–0	Byambakhüügiin Battulga
Lee Shou Kai	2–0	Gantömöriin Altanzul
Leong Chee Weng	2–0	Nyamjantsangiin Oyuunbaatar
Lee Shou Wei	2–0	Ganbatyn Bold
Bye	0–0	Japan
	0–0	
	0–0	
	0–0	
	0–0	
	0–0	

==== Summary ====
Rank	Team	Round						Total	GP
Rank	Team	1	2	3	4	5	6	Total	GP
1	South Korea (KOR)	2	2	2	2	2	2	12	58
2	China (CHN)	2	2	2	0	2	2	10	50
3	Chinese Taipei (TPE)	0	2	2	2	2	0	8	40
4	Japan (JPN)	2	2	0	2	0	2	8	32
5	Hong Kong (HKG)	2	0	0	2	2	2	8	30
6	Singapore (SGP)	2	0	2	0	0	0	4	10
6	Thailand (THA)	0	0	2	0	2	0	4	10
6	Malaysia (MAS)	0	2	0	0	0	2	4	10
9	Mongolia (MGL)	0	0	0	2	0	0	2	0

=== Knockout round ===
Semifinals
1	South Korea	10
4	Japan	0
3	Chinese Taipei	2
2	China	8

Gold medal match
1	South Korea	8
2	China	2
Bronze medal match
4	Japan	8
3	Chinese Taipei	2

==== Semifinals ====
	Score	
South Korea	10–0	Japan
Byun Sang-il	2–0	Kotaro Seki
Kim Myung-hun	2–0	Toramaru Shibano
Park Jeong-hwan	2–0	Ryo Ichiriki
Shin Jin-seo	2–0	Atsushi Sada
Shin Min-jun	2–0	Yuta Iyama
Chinese Taipei	2–8	China
Hsu Hao-hung	2–0	Li Qincheng
Lai Jyun-fu	0–2	Zhao Chenyu
Lin Chun-yen	0–2	Mi Yuting
Wang Yuan-jyun	0–2	Yang Dingxin
Hsu Chia-yuan	0–2	Ke Jie

==== Bronze medal match ====
	Score	
Japan	8–2	Chinese Taipei
Kotaro Seki	0–2	Hsu Hao-hung
Toramaru Shibano	2–0	Lai Jyun-fu
Ryo Ichiriki	2–0	Wang Yuan-jyun
Atsushi Sada	2–0	Hsu Chia-yuan
Yuta Iyama	2–0	Hsu Ching-en

==== Gold medal match ====
	Score	
South Korea	8–2	China
Byun Sang-il	0–2	Li Qincheng
Kim Myung-hun	2–0	Zhao Chenyu
Park Jeong-hwan	2–0	Mi Yuting
Shin Jin-seo	2–0	Yang Dingxin
Shin Min-jun	2–0	Ke Jie
