= Go at the 2022 Asian Games – Men's individual =

Men's individual at the 2022 Asian Games
- Venue: Hangzhou Chess Academy
- Date: 24–28 September 2023
- Competitors: 18 from 9 nations

Medalists
gold medal	Hsu Hao-hung	Chinese Taipei
silver medal	Ke Jie	China
bronze medal	Shin Jin-seo	South Korea

The Men's individual go competition at the 2022 Asian Games in Hangzhou, China was held from 24 September to 28 September 2023 at Hangzhou Chess Academy. Each player had one hour and 30 seconds byoyomi periods.

In the preliminary round, the tie-breaking system was the sum of opponents' scores (SOS), but if a second-level tie break was needed, the first-round opponents' scores were subtracted from the SOS scores.

== Schedule ==
All times are China Standard Time (UTC+08:00)

Date	Time	Event
Sunday, 24 September 2023	09:30	Round 1
Sunday, 24 September 2023	15:00	Round 2
Monday, 25 September 2023	09:30	Round 3
Monday, 25 September 2023	15:00	Round 4
Tuesday, 26 September 2023	09:30	Round 5
Tuesday, 26 September 2023	15:00	Round 6
Wednesday, 27 September	15:00	Quarterfinals
Thursday, 28 September 2023	09:30	Semifinals
Thursday, 28 September 2023	15:00	Finals

== Results ==
=== Preliminary round ===
==== Group A ====
===== Round 1 =====
Black	Score	White
Hsu Hao-hung (TPE)	2–0	Lee Shou Kai (MAS)
Chan Chi Hin (HKG)	2–0	Wichrich Karuehawanit (THA)
Shin Jin-seo (KOR)	2–0	Yang Dingxin (CHN)
Kwa Jie Hui (SGP)	2–0	Sam In Hang (MAC)
Toramaru Shibano (JPN)	2–0	Bye

===== Round 2 =====
Black	Score	White
Toramaru Shibano (JPN)	2–0	Kwa Jie Hui (SGP)
Shin Jin-seo (KOR)	2–0	Chan Chi Hin (HKG)
Sam In Hang (MAC)	0–2	Hsu Hao-hung (TPE)
Yang Dingxin (CHN)	2–0	Wichrich Karuehawanit (THA)
Bye	0–2	Lee Shou Kai (MAS)

===== Round 3 =====
Black	Score	White
Hsu Hao-hung (TPE)	0–2	Shin Jin-seo (KOR)
Lee Shou Kai (MAS)	0–2	Toramaru Shibano (JPN)
Chan Chi Hin (HKG)	0–2	Yang Dingxin (CHN)
Wichrich Karuehawanit (THA)	2–0	Kwa Jie Hui (SGP)
Sam In Hang (MAC)	2–0	Bye

===== Round 4 =====
Black	Score	White
Toramaru Shibano (JPN)	0–2	Shin Jin-seo (KOR)
Yang Dingxin (CHN)	2–0	Hsu Hao-hung (TPE)
Wichrich Karuehawanit (THA)	2–0	Sam In Hang (MAC)
Kwa Jie Hui (SGP)	2–0	Lee Shou Kai (MAS)
Bye	0–2	Chan Chi Hin (HKG)

===== Round 5 =====
Black	Score	White
Shin Jin-seo (KOR)	2–0	Kwa Jie Hui (SGP)
Yang Dingxin (CHN)	2–0	Toramaru Shibano (JPN)
Hsu Hao-hung (TPE)	2–0	Chan Chi Hin (HKG)
Lee Shou Kai (MAS)	0–2	Sam In Hang (MAC)
Wichrich Karuehawanit (THA)	2–0	Bye

===== Round 6 =====
Black	Score	White
Shin Jin-seo (KOR)	2–0	Wichrich Karuehawanit (THA)
Sam In Hang (MAC)	0–2	Yang Dingxin (CHN)
Toramaru Shibano (JPN)	0–2	Hsu Hao-hung (TPE)
Chan Chi Hin (HKG)	2–0	Lee Shou Kai (MAS)
Bye	0–2	Kwa Jie Hui (SGP)

===== Summary =====
Rank	Athlete	Round						Total	SOS
Rank	Athlete	1	2	3	4	5	6	Total	SOS
1	Shin Jin-seo (KOR)	2	2	2	2	2	2	12	42
2	Yang Dingxin (CHN)	0	2	2	2	2	2	10	42
3	Hsu Hao-hung (TPE)	2	2	0	0	2	2	8	40
4	Toramaru Shibano (JPN)	2	2	2	0	0	0	6	38_{38}
5	Wichrich Karuehawanit (THA)	0	0	2	2	2	0	6	38_{32}
5	Chan Chi Hin (HKG)	2	0	0	2	0	2	6	38_{32}
7	Kwa Jie Hui (SGP)	2	0	0	2	0	2	6	30
8	Sam In Hang (MAC)	0	0	2	0	2	0	4	32
9	Lee Shou Kai (MAS)	0	2	0	0	0	0	2	30

==== Group B ====
===== Round 1 =====
Black	Score	White
Park Jeong-hwan (KOR)	0–2	Ke Jie (CHN)
Ryo Ichiriki (JPN)	2–0	Chang Fu Kang (MAS)
Lai Jyun-fu (TPE)	2–0	Chan Nai San (HKG)
Lou Wan Kao (MAC)	0–2	Pongsakarn Sornarra (THA)
Kang Zhanbin (SGP)	2–0	Bye

===== Round 2 =====
Black	Score	White
Pongsakarn Sornarra (THA)	0–2	Kang Zhanbin (SGP)
Ke Jie (CHN)	2–0	Lai Jyun-fu (TPE)
Chan Nai San (HKG)	0–2	Ryo Ichiriki (JPN)
Chang Fu Kang (MAS)	2–0	Lou Wan Kao (MAC)
Bye	0–2	Park Jeong-hwan (KOR)

===== Round 3 =====
Black	Score	White
Ke Jie (CHN)	2–0	Ryo Ichiriki (JPN)
Park Jeong-hwan (KOR)	2–0	Kang Zhanbin (SGP)
Chang Fu Kang (MAS)	0–2	Lai Jyun-fu (TPE)
Chan Nai San (HKG)	2–0	Lou Wan Kao (MAC)
Pongsakarn Sornarra (THA)	2–0	Bye

===== Round 4 =====
Black	Score	White
Kang Zhanbin (SGP)	0–2	Ke Jie (CHN)
Lai Jyun-fu (TPE)	2–0	Pongsakarn Sornarra (THA)
Ryo Ichiriki (JPN)	0–2	Park Jeong-hwan (KOR)
Chan Nai San (HKG)	2–0	Chang Fu Kang (MAS)
Bye	0–2	Lou Wan Kao (MAC)

===== Round 5 =====
Black	Score	White
Ke Jie (CHN)	2–0	Pongsakarn Sornarra (THA)
Park Jeong-hwan (KOR)	2–0	Lai Jyun-fu (TPE)
Kang Zhanbin (SGP)	0–2	Chan Nai San (HKG)
Lou Wan Kao (MAC)	0–2	Ryo Ichiriki (JPN)
Chang Fu Kang (MAS)	2–0	Bye

===== Round 6 =====
Black	Score	White
Chan Nai San (HKG)	0–2	Ke Jie (CHN)
Chang Fu Kang (MAS)	0–2	Park Jeong-hwan (KOR)
Pongsakarn Sornarra (THA)	0–2	Ryo Ichiriki (JPN)
Lou Wan Kao (MAC)	0–2	Kang Zhanbin (SGP)
Bye	0–2	Lai Jyun-fu (TPE)

===== Summary =====
Rank	Athlete	Round						Total	SOS
Rank	Athlete	1	2	3	4	5	6	Total	SOS
1	Ke Jie (CHN)	2	2	2	2	2	2	12	42
2	Park Jeong-hwan (KOR)	0	2	2	2	2	2	10	38
3	Ryo Ichiriki (JPN)	2	2	0	0	2	2	8	38
4	Lai Jyun-fu (TPE)	2	0	2	2	0	2	8	34
5	Chan Nai San (HKG)	0	0	2	2	2	0	6	40
6	Kang Zhanbin (SGP)	2	2	0	0	0	2	6	34
7	Pongsakarn Sornarra (THA)	2	0	2	0	0	0	4	36
8	Chang Fu Kang (MAS)	0	2	0	0	2	0	4	34
9	Lou Wan Kao (MAC)	0	0	0	2	0	0	2	28

=== Knockout round ===
Quarterfinals
A1	Shin Jin-seo (KOR)	2
B4	Lai Jyun-fu (TPE)	0
A3	Hsu Hao-hung (TPE)	2
B2	Park Jeong-hwan (KOR)	0
A2	Yang Dingxin (CHN)	0
B3	Ryo Ichiriki (JPN)	2
A4	Toramaru Shibano (JPN)	0
B1	Ke Jie (CHN)	2

Semifinals
A1	Shin Jin-seo (KOR)	0
A3	Hsu Hao-hung (TPE)	2
B3	Ryo Ichiriki (JPN)	0
B1	Ke Jie (CHN)	2

Gold medal match
A3	Hsu Hao-hung (TPE)	2
B1	Ke Jie (CHN)	0
Bronze medal match
A1	Shin Jin-seo (KOR)	2
B3	Ryo Ichiriki (JPN)	0

==== Quarterfinals ====
Black	Score	White
Shin Jin-seo (KOR)	2–0	Lai Jyun-fu (TPE)
Hsu Hao-hung (TPE)	2–0	Park Jeong-hwan (KOR)
Yang Dingxin (CHN)	0–2	Ryo Ichiriki (JPN)
Toramaru Shibano (JPN)	0–2	Ke Jie (CHN)

==== Semifinals ====
Black	Score	White
Shin Jin-seo (KOR)	0–2	Hsu Hao-hung (TPE)
Ryo Ichiriki (JPN)	0–2	Ke Jie (CHN)

==== Bronze medal match ====
Black	Score	White
Shin Jin-seo (KOR)	2–0	Ryo Ichiriki (JPN)

==== Gold medal match ====
Black	Score	White
Hsu Hao-hung (TPE)	2–0	Ke Jie (CHN)
