= Changqi Cup =

Chinese Go competition

The Changqi Cup (Chinese: 倡棋杯; pinyin: Chàngqí Bēi), or Chang-ki Cup, is a Go competition in China.

== Outline ==
The Changqi Cup is a Go tournament held by the Zhongguo Qiyuan dedicated to Ing Chang-ki. It began every year on Ing's birthday, October 23 and ended in the spring of the following year. Starting in 2008, the tournament began in May and ended in October.

Players compete in a preliminary tournament to qualify. After the preliminaries, 30 players compete in a single elimination tournament, with the previous year's finalists being directly seeded to the second round. The semifinals and final are a best-of-three match. The Changqi Cup is one of the few professional tournaments to use Ing rules. The winner receives CN¥450,000 in prize money, and the runner-up receives CN¥150,000.

== Past winners and runners-up ==
Edition	Year	Winner	Score	Runner-up
1st	2004	Kong Jie	2–1	Wang Lei
2nd	2005	Zhou Heyang	2–0	Kong Jie
3rd	2006	Kong Jie	2–1	Gu Li
4th	2007	Gu Li	2–1	Liu Xing
5th	2008	Qiu Jun	2–1	Liu Xing
6th	2009	Wang Xi	2–0	Wang Yao
7th	2010	Tuo Jiaxi	2–1	Zhou Ruiyang
8th	2011	Gu Li	2–0	Liu Xing
9th	2012	Chen Yaoye	2–1	Tuo Jiaxi
10th	2013	Shi Yue	2–0	Lian Xiao
11th	2014	Yang Dingxin	2–0	Piao Wenyao
12th	2015	Lian Xiao	2–0	Qiu Jun
13th	2016	Tuo Jiaxi	2–0	Lian Xiao
14th	2017	Tan Xiao	2–0	Jiang Weijie
15th	2018	Mi Yuting	2–1	Tuo Jiaxi
16th	2019	Ke Jie	2–0	Zhou Ruiyang
17th	2021	Ding Hao	2–0	Yang Dingxin
18th	2023	Wang Xinghao	2–0	Mi Yuting
19th	2025	Ding Hao	2–0	Mi Yuting
