= 25th Tianyuan =

The 25th Tianyuan began on 2 February and concluded on 13 April 2011. Defending champion Chen Yaoye kept his title, defeating challenger Zhou Hexi in two games.

== Tournament ==
Round of 32
Hu Yaoyu	1
Gu Li	0
Zhou Ruiyang	1
Chang Hao	0
Zhou Hexi	1
Li Kang	0
Ding Wei	0
Gu Lingyi	1
Wang Yao	0
Piao Wenyao	1
Tang Weixing	0
Chun Guangya	1
Mi Yuting	0
Li Haojie	1
Huang Yizhong	1
Kong Jie	0
Tan Xiao	1
Tuo Jiaxi	0
Chen Hao	0
Jiang Weijie	1
Wang Xi	0
Liu Xing	1
Luo Xihe	0
Shi Yue	1
Zhu Yuanhao	0
Xie He	1
Peng Quan	0
Meng Tailing	1
Zhang Li	1
Sun Tengyu	0
Yu Bin	1
Qiu Jun	0

Round of 16
Hu Yaoyu	1
Zhou Ruiyang	0
Zhou Hexi	1
Gu Lingyi	0
Piao Wenyao	0
Chun Guangya	1
Li Haojie	1
Huang Yizhong	0
Tan Xiao	1
Jiang Weijie	0
Liu Xing	0
Shi Yue	1
Xie He	1
Meng Tailing	0
Zhang Li	0
Yu Bin	1

Quarter-finals
Hu Yaoyu	0
Zhou Hexi	1
Chun Guangya	0
Li Haojie	1
Tan Xiao	0
Shi Yue	1
Xie He	0
Yu Bin	1

Semi-finals
Zhou Hexi	1
Li Haojie	0
Shi Yue	0
Yu Bin	1

Finals
Zhou Hexi	1
Yu Bin	0

== Finals ==
Player	1	2	3	T
Chen Yaoye (Tianyuan)	B+R	W+4.5		2
Zhou Hexi (Challenger)				0

== See also ==
- For information on the preliminary rounds, see Igo-Kisen.
