= 9th Nongshim Cup =

The 8th Nongshim Cup began on 16 October 2007 and concluded on 22 February 2008, with Chang Hao winning four rounds in a row to lead Team China to their first victory.

== Teams ==
Team China	Team Japan	(South Korea) Team Korea
Chang Hao	Yoda Norimoto	Lee Chang-ho
Gu Li	Yamada Kimio	Pak Yeong-hun
Wang Xi	Hane Naoki	Mok Jin-seok
Hu Yaoyu	Takao Shinji	Cho Hanseung
Peng Quan	Kono Rin	Hong Minpyo

== Results ==
=== First round ===
Players	1st Round	2nd Round	3rd Round	4th Round
(China) Peng Quan	Hane Naoki	Hong Minpyo	Wang Xi	Wang Xi
(Japan) Hane Naoki	Hane Naoki	Hong Minpyo	Wang Xi	Wang Xi
(South Korea) Hong Minpyo		Hong Minpyo	Wang Xi	Wang Xi
(China) Wang Xi			Wang Xi	Wang Xi
(Japan) Kono Rin				Wang Xi

=== Second round ===
Players	1st Round	2nd Round	3rd Round	4th Round	5th Round	6th Round
(China) Wang Xi	Wang Xi	Yamada Kimio	Mok Jin-seok	Mok Jin-seok	Mok Jin-seok	Chang Hao
(South Korea) Cho Hanseung	Wang Xi	Yamada Kimio	Mok Jin-seok	Mok Jin-seok	Mok Jin-seok	Chang Hao
(Japan) Yamada Kimio		Yamada Kimio	Mok Jin-seok	Mok Jin-seok	Mok Jin-seok	Chang Hao
(South Korea) Mok Jin-seok			Mok Jin-seok	Mok Jin-seok	Mok Jin-seok	Chang Hao
(China) Hu Yaoyu				Mok Jin-seok	Mok Jin-seok	Chang Hao
(Japan) Yoda Norimoto					Mok Jin-seok	Chang Hao
(China) Chang Hao						Chang Hao

=== Final round ===
Players	1st Round	2nd Round	3rd Round
(China) Chang Hao	Chang Hao	Chang Hao	Chang Hao
(Japan) Takao Shinji	Chang Hao	Chang Hao	Chang Hao
(South Korea) Lee Chang-ho		Chang Hao	Chang Hao
(South Korea) Pak Yeong-hun			Chang Hao

9th Nongshim Cup Champions
Team China (1st title)
