= Longxing (competition) =

Chinese Go competition

The Longxing (Chinese: 龙星战; pinyin: Lóngxīng Zhàn) is a Go competition in China. It is the Chinese equivalent of the Japanese Ryusei.

== Outline ==
The Longxing is a Go tournament played with fast time controls: Each player has 30 seconds per move, along with 10 one-minute periods of extra thinking time. As of 2023, the winner receives 200,000 RMB in prize money, and the runner-up receives 80,000 RMB. It is sponsored by the Go / Shogi Channel, a Japanese broadcaster.

== Past winners and runners-up ==
| Edition | Year | Winner | Score | Runner-up |
|---|---|---|---|---|
| 1st | 2008 | Gu Li | 1–0 | Kong Jie |
| 2nd | 2010 | Gu Lingyi | 2–1 | Wang Xi |
| 3rd | 2011 | Li Zhe | 2–0 | Wang Haoyang |
| 4th | 2012 | Mao Ruilong | 2–0 | Tuo Jiaxi |
| 5th | 2014 | Gu Li | 2–1 | Li Zhe |
| 6th | 2015 | Tuo Jiaxi | 2–1 | Tan Xiao |
| 7th | 2016 | Mi Yuting | 2–0 | Chen Yaoye |
| 8th | 2017 | Ke Jie | 2–0 | Li Qincheng |
| 9th | 2018 | Ke Jie | 2–1 | Lian Xiao |
| 10th | 2019 | Jiang Weijie | 2–1 | Xu Jiayang |
| 11th | 2020 | Ke Jie | 2–1 | Lian Xiao |
| 12th | 2021 | Gu Zihao | 2–1 | Mi Yuting |
| 13th | 2023 | Li Weiqing | 2–1 | Ding Hao |
