= 8th Nongshim Cup =

2006–2007 Go competition

The 8th Nongshim Cup began on 12 September 2006 and concluded on 9 February 2007, with Lee Chang-ho leading Team Korea to their seventh title.

== Teams ==
Team China	Team Japan	(South Korea) Team Korea
Gu Li	Yoda Norimoto	Lee Chang-ho
Wang Lei	Imamura Toshiya	Cho Hunhyun
Kong Jie	Yamada Kimio	Choi Cheol-han
Peng Quan	Hane Naoki	Pak Yeong-hun
Chen Yaoye	Takao Shinji	Won Seong-jin

== Results ==
=== First round ===
Players	1st Round	2nd Round	3rd Round	4th Round
(China) Wang Lei	Hane Naoki	Hane Naoki	Peng Quan	Peng Quan
(Japan) Hane Naoki	Hane Naoki	Hane Naoki	Peng Quan	Peng Quan
(South Korea) Cho Hunhyun		Hane Naoki	Peng Quan	Peng Quan
(China) Peng Quan			Peng Quan	Peng Quan
(South Korea) Choi Cheol-han				Peng Quan

=== Second round ===
Players	1st Round	2nd Round	3rd Round	4th Round	5th Round	6th Round
(China) Peng Quan	Peng Quan	Peng Quan	Peng Quan	Pak Yeong-hun	Pak Yeong-hun	Pak Yeong-hun
(Japan) Imamura Toshiya	Peng Quan	Peng Quan	Peng Quan	Pak Yeong-hun	Pak Yeong-hun	Pak Yeong-hun
(South Korea) Won Seong-jin		Peng Quan	Peng Quan	Pak Yeong-hun	Pak Yeong-hun	Pak Yeong-hun
(Japan) Yamada Kimio			Peng Quan	Pak Yeong-hun	Pak Yeong-hun	Pak Yeong-hun
(South Korea) Pak Yeong-hun				Pak Yeong-hun	Pak Yeong-hun	Pak Yeong-hun
(Japan) Takao Shinji					Pak Yeong-hun	Pak Yeong-hun
(China) Chen Yaoye						Pak Yeong-hun

=== Final round ===
Players	1st Round	2nd Round	3rd Round	4th Round
(South Korea) Pak Yeong-hun	Pak Yeong-hun	Kong Jie	Lee Chang-ho	Lee Chang-ho
(Japan) Yoda Norimoto	Pak Yeong-hun	Kong Jie	Lee Chang-ho	Lee Chang-ho
(China) Kong Jie		Kong Jie	Lee Chang-ho	Lee Chang-ho
(South Korea) Lee Chang-ho			Lee Chang-ho	Lee Chang-ho
(China) Gu Li				Lee Chang-ho

8th Nongshim Cup Champions
Team Korea (7th title)
