= Gu Zihao =

Chinese Go player (born 1998)

Personal information
- Born: March 13, 1998 (age 28) Xiantao, Hubei, China

Sport
- Turned pro: 2010
- Rank: 9 dan
- Affiliation: Chinese Weiqi Association

Gu Zihao (Chinese: 辜梓豪; pinyin: Gū Zǐháo; born 13 March 1998) is a Chinese professional go player. He is the winner of two major international championships: the Samsung Cup in 2017 and the Quzhou Lanke Cup in 2023.

Gu Zihao was born in Xiantao, Hubei in 1998. He began to play go when he was 6 years old. To further study go, he moved to Wuhan at age 9, and then to Beijing at age 11. He earned professional 1 dan rank in 2010, when he was 12. He began participating in the Chinese A League in 2012. In 2015, he won China's National Go Individual tournament, and the Limin Cup, an under-20 international tournament.

He won an international title at the Samsung Cup in 2017, defeating Tang Weixing in the finals. Gu, who was 5 dan at the time, was promoted to 9 dan for the victory.

He won two domestic competitions in 2018, the Weifu Fangkai Cup and the Ahan Tongshan Cup, as well as the China-Japan Agon Cup playoff. In January 2020, while visiting family in his hometown Xiantao, he fell under the COVID-19 lockdown in Hubei; he continued to compete remotely while staying there until April. He won the CCTV Cup later that year, followed by several championships in 2021: the Tianyuan, the Ahan Tongshan Cup and China–Japan playoff, and the Longxing.

He claimed his second major international title in the Quzhou Lanke Cup in June 2023, beating Shin Jin-seo. In August 2023, he overtook Ke Jie to become the number one ranked Chinese player in the Chinese Weiqi Association's official rankings.

Gu is sometimes nicknamed èbà 'evil tyrant' (Chinese: "恶霸"), derived from a username which he used for playing go online, Yìnchéng zhī bà 'Indianapolis tyrant' (Chinese: "印城之霸"). He originally chose the username because he was a fan of the Indiana Pacers in the NBA.

== Titles ==
International:

- Limin Cup 2015 (under-20 tournament)
- Samsung Cup 2017
- China-Japan Agon Cup 2018 and 2021
- Quzhou Lanke Cup 2023

Chinese:

- National Go Individual 2015
- Weifu Fangkai Cup 2018
- Ahan Tongshan Cup 2018 and 2021
- CCTV Cup 2020
- Tianyuan 2021
- Longxing 2021
- South-West Qiwang 2025
