= 8th Chang-ki Cup =

2011 Go competition in China

The 8th Chang-ki Cup was held from June to October 2011. Gu Li won the final by defeating Liu Xing 2 to 0.

== Tournament ==
Round of 16
3 June
Zhou Ruiyang	0
Meng Tailing	1
3 June
Chen Yaoye	0
Peng Liyao	1
3 June
Xie He	0
Liu Xing	1
3 June
Wang Lei	0
Ding Wei	1
3 June
Wang Xi	1
Niu Yutian	0
3 June
Jiang Weijie	0
Kong Jie	1
3 June
Gu Li	1
Hu Yaoyu	0
3 June
Qiu Jun	0
Tuo Jiaxi	1

Quarter-finals
5 June
Meng Tailing	0
Peng Liyao	1
5 June
Liu Xing	1
Ding Wei	0
5 June
Wang Xi	0
Kong Jie	1
5 June
Gu Li	1
Tuo Jiaxi	0

Semi-finals
28-31 August
Peng Liyao	1
Liu Xing	2
28-31 August
Kong Jie	0
Gu Li	2

Final
23-25 October
Liu Xing	0
Gu Li	2
