= Qisheng =

Chinese Go competition

The Qisheng (Traditional: 棋聖; Simplified: 棋圣; Pinyin: Qíshèng) is a Go competition in China organized by the Chinese Weiqi Association. The word qíshèng means "Go saint", similar to the Japanese Kisei and the Korean Kiseong.

== Outline ==
The Qisheng consists of a knockout tournament to determine a challenger, who then plays against the previous edition's winner in a best-of-three title match.

In the 4th and 5th edition, the winner received 800,000 RMB in prize money, and the runner-up received 200,000 RMB. In the 6th edition, these prizes were 600,000 RMB and 200,000 RMB, respectively.

As of the 5th edition, games were played with 2 hours of main time and five 60-second byoyomi periods per player.

== Past winners and runners-up ==
Edition	Year	Winner	Score	Runner-up
1st	1999	Chang Hao	4–3	Ma Xiaochun
2nd	2000	Zhou Heyang	4–0	Chang Hao
3rd	2001	Yu Bin	4–2	Zhang Wendong

Edition	Year	Winner	Score	Runner-up
1st	2013	Zhou Ruiyang	3–2	Tuo Jiaxi
2nd	2014	Zhou Ruiyang	3–1	Lian Xiao
3rd	2018	Lian Xiao	2–1	Zhou Ruiyang
4th	2019	Ke Jie	2–1	Lian Xiao
5th	2021	Ke Jie	2–0	Shi Yue
6th	2025	Ke Jie	2–1	Tu Xiaoyu
