= Ding Hao =

Chinese Go player (born 2000)

Personal information
- Born: June 13, 2000 (age 26) Datong, Shanxi, China

Sport
- Turned pro: 2013
- Rank: 9 dan
- Affiliation: Chinese Weiqi Association

Ding Hao (Chinese: 丁浩; pinyin: Dīng Hào; born 13 June 2000) is a Chinese professional Go player.

Ding was born in Datong, Shanxi. He began to attend Go classes when he was seven years old. To continue his studies, he moved to Taiyuan and then to Beijing. He earned professional status in 2013, at age 13.

He won the 2019 CCTV Cup, a tournament with fast time controls. This qualified him as one of China's two representatives for the Asian TV Cup, where he finished as runner-up to Shin Jinseo.

In 2021 he won three Chinese tournaments within a span of three months: the Changqi Cup in October, Guoshou on December 12, and the GBA Cup Chinese Weiqi Master Championship on December 30. He successfully defended the Weiqi Master title in 2022, and lost it to Yang Kaiwen in 2023. He also successfully defended the Guoshou title in October 2023.

He won an international championship at the LG Cup in February 2023 with a victory over Yang Dingxin in the finals. The same year, he won his second major international title at the Samsung Cup in November. In December 2023, he became the number one ranked Chinese player in the Chinese Weiqi Association's official rankings. He won the Samsung Cup again in 2024.

== International competitions ==
Competitions	2019	2020	2021	2022	2023	2024	2025	2026
Samsung Cup	×	×	×	×	W	W	RU	R16
LG Cup	×	R16	×	W	R16	QF	×	QF
Chunlan Cup	-	×	-	R16	-	QF	-	
Mlily Cup	R16	-			R64	-		
Kuksu Mountains	×	-	×	R16	×	×	×	×
Lanke Cup	-				R16	SF	QF	R16
Nanyang Cup	-					R16	-	
Shinhan Cup	-						R16	
Asian TV Cup	SF	-						
Nongshim Cup	×	×	×	×	0:1	0:1	0:1	×

(W) Winner; (RU) Runner-up; (SF) Semifinalist; (QF) Quarterfinalist; (R16) Round of 16; (R32) Round of 32; (R64) Round of 64.

- Note 1: Some competitions last for more than one year. Usually the beginning year of the competition is recorded as the year of competition.
- Note 2: The light green background indicates that the player is still competing in the competition.
- Note 3: '×' means the player did not participate (or lost in the qualification round), while '-' means the competition was not held in that year.
- Note 4: The result of Nongshim Cup means the result of the player (matches won : matches lost). The result '0:0' means the player qualified for his/her national team of Nongshim Cup, and the team won before the player compete in the cup.

== Titles ==
International:

- LG Cup 2023
- Samsung Cup 2023, 2024

Chinese:

- CCTV Cup 2019
- Changqi Cup 2021, 2025
- GBA Cup Chinese Weiqi Master Championship (湾区杯中国围棋大棋士赛; wānqū bēi zhōngguó wéiqí dà qíshì sài) 2021–2022
- Guoshou 2021–2023
- Qiwang 2025
