= Quzhou-Lanke Cup =

Chinese Go competition

The Quzhou-Lanke Cup is a Go competition in China.

== Outline ==
The Quzhou-Lanke Cup is sponsored by the Chinese Weiqi Association and the Sports Administration of Zhejiang Province. As of 2011, it was the most prestigious Chinese tournament, paying 500,000 Yuan ($77,000) to the winner.

== Past winners and runners-up ==
No.	Year	Winner	Score	Runner-up
1	2006	Yu Bin	1–0	Gu Li
2	2008	Gu Li	1–0	Chang Hao
3	2010	Xie He	1–0	Jiang Weijie
4	2012	Meng Tailing	1–0	Tuo Jiaxi
5	2014	Fan Tingyu	1–0	Shi Yue
6	2016	Mi Yuting	1–0	Ke Jie
7	2018	Tan Xiao	1–0	Ke Jie
8	2021	Xu Jiayang	1–0	Yang Dingxin
9	2022	Li Xuanhao	1–0	Fan Tingyu
10	2024	Dang Yifei	1–0	Lian Xiao
