= Fan Yunruo =

Chinese Go player (1996–2020)

Personal information
- Born: 7 January 1996 Shanghai, China
- Died: 2 July 2020 (aged 24) Shanghai, China

Sport
- Rank: 8 dan

Fan Yunruo (Chinese: 范蕴若, 7 January 1996 – 2 July 2020) was a professional Go player.

== Biography ==
In 2016, Fan defeated Lee Sedol in the top 32 of the 21st Samsung Auto Insurance Cup. In this game, he eliminated Shin Jin-seo and Park Junghwan and entered the semi-finals. In 2017, he defeated the 9th dan, the main player of South Korea, Park, and ended the 18th Nongshim Cup.

At about 1 p.m. on 2 July 2020, Fan Yunruo jumped from his home by way of suicide and died. He had been diagnosed with depression during his lifetime.
