= Mi Yuting =

Chinese professional go player (born 1996)

Personal information
- Born: 8 January 1996 (age 30) Xuzhou, Jiangsu, China

Sport
- Turned pro: 2007
- Rank: 9 dan
- Affiliation: Chinese Weiqi Association
Medal record
Men's Go
Representing China
Asian Games
Silver medal – second place	2022 Hangzhou	Men's team

Mi Yuting
- Traditional Chinese: 芈昱廷
- Simplified Chinese: 芈昱廷
Transcriptions
Standard Mandarin
- Hanyu Pinyin: Mǐ Yùtíng

Mi Yuting (Chinese: 芈昱廷; born 8 January 1996) is a Chinese professional go player. As of October 2018, he is ranking 1st in Go ratings with an Elo rating of 3645.

== Promotion record ==
Rank	Year	Notes
1 dan	2007	Promoted to professional dan rank for performance in the Chinese professional qualification tournament.
2 dan	2009	Promoted for performance in the Chinese professional promotion tournament.
3 dan	2010	Promoted for performance in the Chinese professional promotion tournament.
4 dan	2012	Promoted for performance in the Chinese professional promotion tournament.
5 dan	N/A	Skipped due to the Chinese Weiqi Association promotion rules.
6 dan	N/A	Skipped due to the Chinese Weiqi Association promotion rules.
7 dan	N/A	Skipped due to the Chinese Weiqi Association promotion rules.
8 dan	N/A	Skipped due to the Chinese Weiqi Association promotion rules.
9 dan	2013	Won the 1st Mlily Cup against Gu Li.

== Titles and runners-up ==
As of 5 May 2021

Domestic
Title	Wins	Runners-up
Liguang Xinxiu Cup	1 (2009)	
National Go Individual	1 (2012)	
Tianyuan		1 (2015)
Mingren		1 (2015)
Weifu Fangkai Cup		1 (2016)
Longxing	1 (2016)	
Quzhou Lanke Cup	1 (2016)	
CCTV Cup	1 (2016)	
Weiqi Rally Tournament		1 (2018)
Mingren	1 (2018)	1 (2017)
Xinan Wang	1 (2018)	
Changqi Cup	1 (2018)	
Total	8	5
International
Title	Wins	Runners-up
Mlily Cup	2 (2013, 2021)	
Limin Cup	1 (2017)	
Total	3	0
Career Total
Total	11	5

== Head-to-head record vs selected players ==
As of 1 July 2018

Players who have won international go titles in bold.

- (China) Lian Xiao 6:12
- (China) **Zhou Ruiyang** 10:6
- (China) **Tang Weixing** 10:4
- (China) **Shi Yue** 9:5
- (China) **Chen Yaoye** 8:4
- (South Korea) **Choi Cheolhan** 7:5
- (China) **Tuo Jiaxi** 5:7
- (China) **Gu Zihao** 8:3
- (China) Fan Yunruo 7:4
- (China) **Jiang Weijie** 7:4
- (China) **Tong Mengcheng** 9:1
- (China) **Wang Xi** 7:3
- (China) Yang Dingxin 6:4
- (South Korea) **Park Junghwan** 4:6
- (China) **Gu Li** 6:3
- (China) **Li Qincheng** 5:4
- (China) Liao Xingwen 7:1
- (China) Huang Yunsong 4:4
- (China) Xie He 7:1
- (China) Peng Liyao 5:3
- (China) Zhou Hexi 5:3
- (China) Mao Ruilong 4:4
- (China) Qiu Jun 4:3
- (China) **Ke Jie** 1:6
