= Kotaro Fukuoka =

Japanese Go player (born 2005)

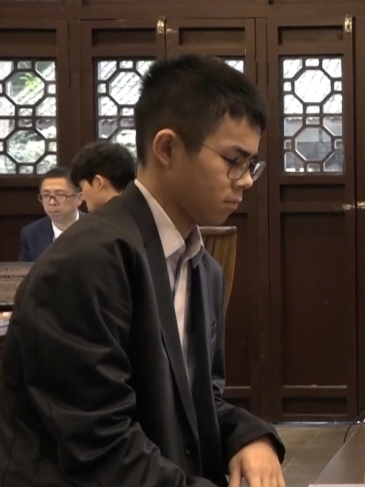

Personal information
- Born: December 22, 2005 (age 20)

Sport
- Turned pro: April 1, 2019 (age 13)
- Teacher: Hon Seisen 4-dan
- Rank: 8-dan
- Affiliation: Nihon Ki-in

Kotaro Fukuoka (福岡 航太朗, Fukuoka Kōtarō; born December 22, 2005) is a Japanese Go professional affiliated with the Nihon Ki-in. He holds the rank of 8-dan. Born in Tokyo, he is a student of Hon Seisen 4-dan.

== Early life ==
At age four, he became interested in Go after seeing a goban at his grandfather's house, and after entering elementary school he began attending a Go salon alongside his other lessons. When he was in second grade, he enrolled at the Hon Dojo.

In fourth grade he went alone to South Korea to study Go, returning to Japan intermittently.

Twice, in fifth and sixth grade, he tried to qualify as a professional as an external (non-insei) candidate, but failed to pass the preliminaries. In his first year of junior high school he became an insei at the Nihon Ki-in Tokyo Headquarters. In insei games he advanced from E-class to B-class with 114 consecutive wins, reaching A-class soon after, in the shortest time on record. In November 2018, he finished 11–4 in the main round of the winter pro exams, winning his last six games after a 5–4 start, and qualified as runner-up behind Hirohito Toyoda (13–2).

== Professional career ==
In 2022, he reached the main event of the 47th Gosei – his first appearance in the main event of any of Japan's seven major Go titles. He defeated Cho U 9-dan in the first round and Shinji Takao 9-dan in the second round, before losing to Norimoto Yoda 9-dan in the quarterfinals.

In the 33rd Ryusei tournament in 2024, he went undefeated in Block F. In the final, he defeated Iyama Ryusei, who was aiming for a third consecutive title. The win earned him promotion to 7-dan.

In 2026, he won the Teikei Cup Shun'ei Tournament, going 2-0 in the finals against Yu Otake. Around the same time, he played Otake in the challenger decision match of the 81st Honinbo tournament, which he won by 2.5 points, securing a title challenge against Honinbo Ryo Ichiriki. The title match was played between May and July, and Fukuoka won 3-2, becoming the youngest ever winner of the tournament.
