= Hong Min-pyo =

South Korean Go player

Hong Minpyo
Personal information
- Native name: 홍민표 (Korean); 洪旼杓 (Korean)
- Born: May 9, 1984 (age 41) South Korea

Sport
- Teacher: Kim Won
- Rank: 9 dan
- Affiliation: Hanguk Kiwon

Hong Minpyo (Korean: 홍민표; born May 9, 1984) is a professional Go player.

== Biography ==
Hong became a 4 dan in 2004. He reached the quarter finals of the biggest international tournament, the LG Cup, in 2006. He reached 9 dan in 2015.
