= Fan Tingyu =

Chinese professional Go player

Fan Tingyu 范廷钰
Personal information
- Born: 6 August 1996 (age 29) Shanghai, China

Sport
- Turned pro: 2009
- Teacher: Cao Dayuan
- Rank: 9 dan
- Affiliation: Zhongguo Qiyuan

Fan Tingyu
- Traditional Chinese: 范廷鈺
- Simplified Chinese: 范廷钰
Transcriptions
Standard Mandarin
- Hanyu Pinyin: Fàn Tíngyù

Fan Tingyu (born 6 August 1996) is a Chinese professional Go player.

He won the 17th Xinren Wang and 18th Xinren Wang.

Fan defeated Park Junghwan (b. 1993) [3-1] in the final of the 7th (2012/13) Ing Cup, and became the youngest Ing Cup title holder in history. Fan is also the second-youngest 9 dan (Lee Changho became 9 dan a bit before Fan) in history.

== Promotion record ==
Rank	Year	Notes
1 dan	2009	Promoted to professional dan rank after placing in professional qualification tournament.
2 dan	2009	Promoted for performance in the Chinese professional promotion tournament.
3 dan	2010	Promoted for performance in the Chinese professional promotion tournament.
4 dan	2013	Skipped due to the Chinese Weiqi Association promotion rules.
5 dan	2013	Skipped due to the Chinese Weiqi Association promotion rules.
6 dan	2013	Skipped due to the Chinese Weiqi Association promotion rules.
7 dan	2013	Skipped due to the Chinese Weiqi Association promotion rules.
8 dan	2013	Skipped due to the Chinese Weiqi Association promotion rules.
9 dan	2013	Won the 7th Ing Cup against Park Junghwan.

== Career Record ==
- 2010: 31 wins, 12 losses
- 2011: 15 wins, 8 losses

== Titles and Runners-up ==
As of 10 June 2018

Domestic
Title	Wins	Runners-up
Liguang Xinxiu Cup		1 (2011)
Weifu Fangkai Cup		1 (2012)
Xinren Wang	3 (2010-2012)	
Ahan Tongshan Cup		1 (2013)
Quzhou-Lanke Cup	1 (2014)	
CCTV Cup	1 (2018)	
Total	5	2
International
Ing Cup	1 (2013)	
Total	1	0
Career Total
Total	6	2
