= Bailing Cup =

International Go competition

The Bailing Cup (Chinese: 百灵杯) was an international Go competition. The tournament was held every two years between 2012 and 2019, for a total of four times. It was sponsored by the Bailing Group of China.

== Seeded players and preliminaries ==
16 seeded players were invited and 48 players qualified from preliminaries. Seeded players were chosen as follows:

- 2 top players of last tournament
- 5 from China
- 3 from Japan
- 3 from South Korea
- 1 from Chinese Taipei
- 2 from wild cards (issued from the host)

The winner's purse was ¥1,800,000.

In the 4th Bailing Cup, it became a tournament with 16 players competing. Players were chosen as follows:

- 2 top players of last tournament
- 6 from China
- 3 from Japan
- 3 from South Korea
- 1 from Chinese Taipei
- 1 from a wild card (issued from the host)

The winner's purse was ¥1,000,000.

== Winners and runners-up ==
Edition	Years	Winner	Score	Runner-up
1st	2012–2013	(China) Zhou Ruiyang	3–0	(China) Chen Yaoye
2nd	2014–2015	(China) Ke Jie	3–2	(China) Qiu Jun
3rd	2016–2017	(China) Chen Yaoye	3–1	(China) Ke Jie
4th	2018–2019	(China) Ke Jie	2–0	(South Korea) Shin Jinseo
