= Zhou Hexi =

Chinese Go player

Personal information
- Native name: 周贺玺 (Chinese)
- Full name: Zhou Hexi
- Born: 28 October 1992 (age 33) China

Sport
- Turned pro: 2007
- Rank: 4 dan
- Affiliation: Chinese Weiqi Association

Zhou Hexi (Chinese: 周贺玺; pinyin: Zhōu Hèxǐ; born 28 October 1992) is a Chinese professional Go player.

He was the runner-up for the 25th Tianyuan.

== Promotion record ==
Rank	Year	Notes
1 dan	2007	
2 dan	2008	
3 dan	2009	
4 dan	2010	
5 dan		
6 dan		
7 dan		
8 dan		
9 dan		

== Career record ==
- 2011: 17 wins, 9 losses

== Titles and runners-up ==
Domestic
Title	Wins	Runners-up
Tianyuan		1 (2011)
Total	0	1
