= Li Xuanhao =

Chinese Go player (born 1995)

Personal information
- Born: February 1, 1995 (age 31) Chongqing, China

Sport
- Turned pro: 2008
- Rank: 9 dan
- Affiliation: Chinese Weiqi Association

Li Xuanhao (simplified Chinese: 李轩豪; traditional Chinese: 李軒豪; pinyin: Lǐ Xuānháo; born February 1, 1995) is a Chinese professional Go player.

== Life ==
Li was born in Chongqing. He began to attend Go classes when he was five or six years old. At age nine, he left Chongqing for Beijing to study at the Nie Weiping dojo, living without his parents. He earned professional 1-dan rank in 2008, at age 13.

After many years of professional competition, 2022 was a breakout year for Li. He reached 9 dan in April. He won two domestic tournaments, the Quzhou-Lanke Cup in April and the Wangzhongwang ('King of Kings') in May. His standings rose in the Chinese Weiqi Association's official rankings of Chinese players, eventually overtaking Ke Jie to become the number one ranked Chinese player in February 2023.

In December 2022, Chinese player Yang Dingxin publicly suggested that Li cheated using AI, an accusation which the Chinese Weiqi Association soon determined was unsubstantiated. Yang made the controversial allegation at the time of a Chunlan Cup semifinal game between Li Xuanhao and Shin Jinseo, which Li won. Li had also defeated Yang himself in the quarterfinals of the same tournament. The Chinese Weiqi Association ruled that there was no evidence of cheating, and penalized Yang with a six-month partial suspension from competition. Li finished the Chunlan Cup as runner-up.

He won an international title at the MLily Cup in May 2024. He won two domestic tournaments later the same year: the Wangzhongwang in July and the GBA Cup Chinese Weiqi Master Championship in October.

== Titles ==
International:

- MLily Cup 2024

Chinese:

- National Go Individual 2014
- Quzhou-Lanke Cup 2022
- Wangzhongwang ('King of Kings') 2022, 2024
- GBA Cup Chinese Weiqi Master Championship 2024
- South-West Qiwang 2026
