= Go at the Asian Games =

- Governing bodies: IGF (World) / AGF (Asia)
- Events: 3 (men: 2; women: 1)

Games
- 1951; 1954; 1958; 1962; 1966; 1970; 1974; 1978; 1982; 1986; 1990; 1994; 1998; 2002; 2006; 2010; 2014; 2018; 2022; 2026
- Medalists

Go became a medal sport at the 2010 Asian Games as Weiqi, and in 2019, during Olympic Council of Asia's General Assembly it was decided the return of the sport in the 2022 Asian Games, which was held in Hangzhou, China, the OCA later dropped Go from the program again for the next Asian Games in 2026.

== Editions ==
Games	Year	Host city	Best nation
XVI	2010	Guangzhou, China	South Korea
XIX	2022	Hangzhou, China	China

== Events ==
Event	10	22	Years
Men's individual		X	1
Men's team	X	X	2
Women's team	X	X	2
Mixed pair	X		1
Total	3	3	

== Medal table ==
Rank	Nation	Gold	Silver	Bronze	Total
1	South Korea (KOR)	4	1	2	7
2	China (CHN)	1	5	0	6
3	Chinese Taipei (TPE)	1	0	1	2
4	Japan (JPN)	0	0	3	3
Totals (4 entries)		6	6	6	18

== Participating nations ==
Nation	10	22	Years
China	10	10	2
Chinese Taipei	10	10	2
Hong Kong	4	10	2
Japan	10	8	2
Macau		2	1
Malaysia	10	10	2
Mongolia	2	8	2
North Korea	5		1
Singapore		5	1
South Korea	10	10	2
Thailand	10	10	2
Vietnam	6		1
Number of nations	10	10	
Number of athletes	77	83	
