= Hsu Chia-yuan =

Taiwanese Go player (born 1997)

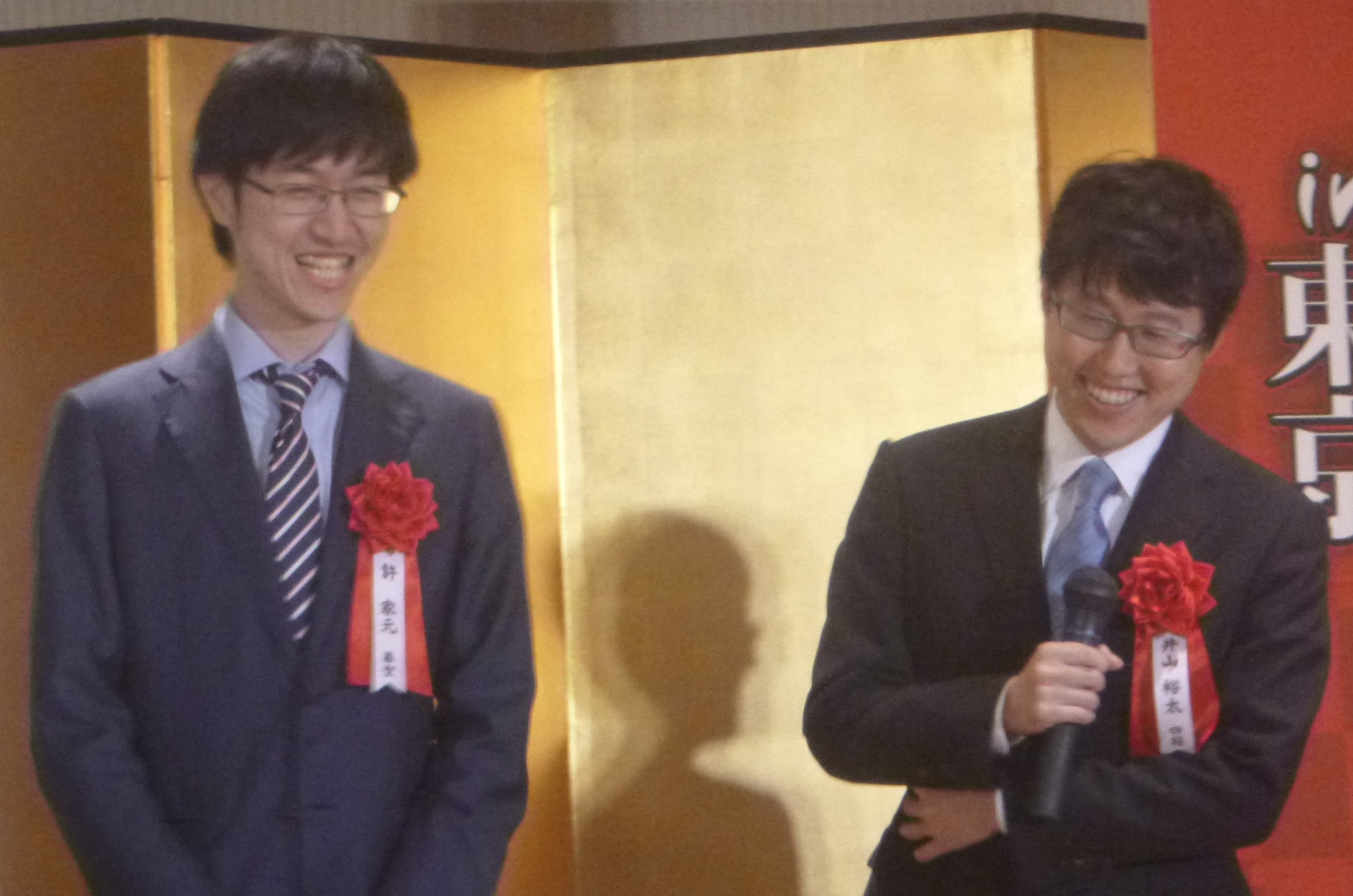
- Hsu Chia-yuan (left) with Iyama Yuta in 2019

Personal information
- Born: 24 December 1997 (age 28) Taipei, Taiwan

Sport
- Turned pro: 2013
- Teacher: Takabayashi Takuji
- Rank: 9 dan
- Affiliation: Nihon Ki-in

Hsu Chia-yuan

Chinese name
- Traditional Chinese: 許家元
- Simplified Chinese: 许家元
Transcriptions
Standard Mandarin
- Hanyu Pinyin: Xǔ Jiāyuán
- Wade–Giles: Hsü^{3} Chia^{1} Yüan^{2}

Japanese name
- Kanji: 許家元
- Kana: きょ かげん
Transcriptions
- Romanization: Kyo Kagen

Hsu Chia-yuan or Kyo Kagen (許家元; born 24 December 1997) is a Taiwanese Go player who plays professionally in Japan.

== Biography ==
Hsu was born in Taipei, Taiwan. After graduating from elementary school, he moved to Japan in 2010 to study as an insei with Takabayashi Takuji 6 dan as his teacher. Hsu became a Nihon Ki-in professional in 2013, based on the results of the professional qualification league held in late 2012.

His first championship in an official tournament was at the Shinjin-O (King of the New Stars) in 2015.

In 2018, he won the 43rd Gosei, his first major title. He won the title match 3–0 against Iyama Yuta, ending Iyama's reign as the simultaneous holder of all seven major Japanese titles. At the time of his win, Hsu had been a professional for only 5 years 4 months. This broke the record of 6 years 0 months set by Ida Atsushi in 2015 for being the fastest to go from becoming professional to winning a major title.

In his 2019 Gosei title defense, he was defeated 3–2 by Hane Naoki. Later that year, Hsu was the challenger for the 45th Tengen, and lost 3–2 to Iyama Yuta. Hsu challenged Shibano Toramaru for the 68th Oza in 2020, and was defeated 3–1.

In 2021, he won the 59th Judan, his second major title, in a 3–2 victory over Shibano Toramaru. He successfully defended the Judan title in 2022 against Yu Zhengqi, who is also from Taiwan.

== Promotion record ==
Rank	Year	Notes
1 dan	2013	
2 dan	2014	
3 dan	2015	
4 dan	2016	
5 dan		
6 dan		
7 dan	2017	Entered Kisei S League.
8 dan	2018	Won the 43rd Gosei.
9 dan	2021	Won the 59th Judan.
