= Ke Jie =

Chinese Go player (born 1997)

Ke Jie 柯洁
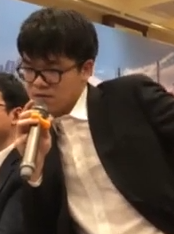

Personal information
- Born: 2 August 1997 (age 29) Lishui, Zhejiang, China
- Height: 1.82 m (6 ft 0 in)

Sport
- Turned pro: 2008
- Rank: 9 dan
- Affiliation: Chinese Weiqi Association
Medal record
Men's Go
Representing China
Asian Games
Silver medal – second place	2022 Hangzhou	Individual
Silver medal – second place	2022 Hangzhou	Team

Ke Jie
- Traditional Chinese: 柯潔
- Simplified Chinese: 柯洁
Transcriptions
Standard Mandarin
- Hanyu Pinyin: Kē Jié

Ke Jie (Chinese: 柯洁; pinyin: Kē Jié; born August 2, 1997) is a Chinese professional Go player of 9 dan rank. According to the Go Ratings, Ke Jie maintained his position as world number one from August 2014 until November 2017. He became a professional player in 2008 and has won eight world championships.

== Early life, family and education ==
He was born in Liandu District, Lishui City, Zhejiang Province.

His father, Ke Guofan (柯国凡), was a water-resources engineer and an amateur 4-dan Go player. Jie's mother, Zhou Liuping (周柳萍), was also an amateur Go player.

Ke Jie began learning Go at the age three by his father and began more formal training for it at age five. At age eight, he and his mother relocated to Beijing so that he could enroll at the Nie Weiping Go Academy.

In 2019, Ke enrolled at Tsinghua University as a Business Administration major.

== Career ==
=== 2008–15: Early career and Bailing Cup breakthrough ===
Ke Jie won his first national championship in 2007. He became a professional Go player in 2008 when he was 10 years old and was promoted to 9 dan in 2015. In January 2015, Ke won his first world title when he won the 2nd Bailing Cup, defeating Qiu Jun 3–2 in the finals.

=== 2015–16: Two international titles and Chinese No. 1 ===
In December 2015, he defeated Shi Yue in the 20th Samsung Cup finals to win another world title.

In January 2016, Ke won the 2nd MLily Cup, defeating world renowned Go player Lee Sedol in the fifth round. According to South Korean 9 dan professionals commenting on the final game, the result hinged on a half-point ko and the peculiarities of Chinese scoring rules; however, others have pointed out that this argument is misleading as differences in komi between the Chinese and Japanese scoring systems would have made up the extra point, leading to the same result.

On 11 February 2016, he defeated Lee once more in the finals of the 2016 HeSui Cup. On 5 March 2016, Ke defeated Lee yet again in the finals of the 2016 Nongshim Cup to win the tournament for the Chinese squad, making it China's third consecutive win of the tournament.

Ke became highest ranked player in the official Chinese Weiqi Association ranking in September 2015.

=== 2016–17: Two international titles ===
In August 2016, at the 3rd Bailing Cup, Ke defeated Xu Jiayang to advance to the best-of-three semifinal match where he faced Won Seong-jin. In the first game, Won defeated Ke with a comeback victory after Ke had made crucial mistakes when analyzing territory turnover; however, he was able to recover in the second game by playing a very close endgame in which he maintained a territorial lead. In the decisive third game, he continued to make advantageous moves during the middle-game and maintained a comfortable territorial lead. Ke was able to force a successful ko fight at the top of Won's territory, resulting in the Won's resignation due to a lack of ko threats. Ke then faced Chen Yaoye in the final best-of-five match, which was the third straight Bailing Cup finals to have been contested between Chinese players. The first two games were both won by Chen. In the first game, Chen displayed his tenacity in chasing and eventually leading in territory with very few opportunities for Ke to win in the endgame. The second game was similar to the first, but during the middle game, Ke deviated and began to chase and attack Chen's dragon, forcing Chen to maneuver around the middle of Ke's territory; however, Ke's made a mistake on the 105th move that allowed Chen to retaliate and take the initiative, causing the match to eventually end on move 178.

From 31 October 2016 to 2 November 2016, Ke played against rival Lee Sedol once more during the semifinals of the 21st Samsung Cup. In the first game of the best-of-three match, Ke was reported to have won a very complete game in which Lee had very few opportunities in the endgame; however, going into the second game with no breaks, Ke was not able to maintain his advantage with the white stones and Lee produced one of his trademark comeback victories. The game began very evenly until Ke acquired positional advantage, and a huge lead in territory, but Ke made several mistakes when fighting Lee's dragon in the center of the board. Lee responded accurately and reversed the game, saving his stones and gaining a lead in territory. Lee closed out the second game with a stunning comeback victory. With black winning both games by resignation, the third game had both players coin-toss for the choice of stones. Ke had the white stones in the third game and was able to secure all four corners to gain a territorial lead from the beginning. The remainder of the game displayed his ability to invade and scrape away Lee's territorial potential. As Lee began to find it difficult to gain any territorial advantage, he pressed on the weaknesses of white's territory hoping to reverse the game, but Ke responded accurately and did not allow any opportunities for Lee. Lee resigned the final game, and Ke advanced to the finals of the Samsung Cup for the second year straight. From 6 December 2016 to 8 December 2016, Ke played the finals against compatriot Tuo Jiaxi. After losing the first game with black, Ke won the second game with white to even the match and then won the deciding game with black to successfully defend his Samsung Cup title.

Ke reached the finals of 1st ENN Cup, defeating Ahn Kuk-hyun, Tang Weixing, Ida Atsushi, Lian Xiao and Li Zhe, from November 2016 to May 2017. Ke won the title by defeating Peng Liyao 3–2 in the finals in December 2017.

=== Matches against AlphaGo ===
On 4 June 2016, at a news conference during the 37th World Amateur Go Championship, Yang Jun'an, the party chief of the Zhongguo Qiyuan and executive of the International Go Federation, revealed that the Google program AlphaGo would possibly have a match against Ke in the future. However, Google DeepMind CEO Demis Hassabis responded that it had not yet been decided what to do next with AlphaGo.

In early January 2017, Ke Jie played three unofficial online games against "Master", an updated version of AlphaGo, losing all three. Ke stated he still had "one last move" to defeat AlphaGo. Regarding AlphaGo, Ke Jie stated that "One can only learn from its strategic philosophy and not only tactics."

A three-game match was played by Ke Jie against AlphaGo at the Future of Go Summit in Wuzhen from 23 to 27 May 2017. Google DeepMind offered 1.5 million dollars winner prizes for this match while the losing side took 300,000 dollars for participating in the three games. AlphaGo beat Ke Jie in the first game by half a point on 23 May 2017. The official scoring for the first match was 184 out of the 361 possible points in favor of Ke Jie, but the Chinese Go rule requires a Black victory of at least 4 over the 180.5 (i.e., 184.5 is the minimum for a Black victory). Ke Jie resigned in the second game after 156 moves and the third game after 209 moves.

=== 2018–2020: Three international titles ===
On 5 December 2018, Ke Jie defeated Ahn Guo-hyun in the final of the 23rd Samsung Cup World Open Go Championship to win the title. This was Ke Jie's third Samsung Cup and his sixth world title. On 17 January 2019, Ke Jie defeated Shin Jinseo in the final of the professional division of the 4th Bailing Cup World Professional Go Championship, winning the Bailing Cup again after 2015 and claiming his seventh world title. On 3 November 2020, the 25th Samsung Car Insurance Cup World Go Masters Tournament held the second game of the three-legged final in which Ke Jie again beat Shin Jinseo with black, defeating his opponent with a total score of 2:0, thus winning the Samsung Cup for the fourth time. This is also the eighth world championship of Ke Jie's career.

== Style ==
Ke Jie's style of play is characterized by accurate positional judgment and reading. Ke's reading is both reliable and fast. He regularly uses less time in a game than his opponents. There is no significant weakness in Ke's game. However, he occasionally plays carelessly with a positional advantage without deep reading.

After his defeat to AlphaGo, Ke Jie studied the program's games to find inspiration for new strategies, and adopted a territory-oriented style of play. Ke's opening arsenal is deeply influenced by the new generation of Go programs, namely AlphaGo, FineArt, Zen and CGI. He subsequently went on a 22-game winning streak against human opponents.

== Promotion record ==
Rank	Year	Notes
1 dan	2008	Promoted to professional dan rank after placing in professional qualification tournament.
2 dan	2010	Promoted for performance in the Chinese professional promotion tournament.
3 dan	2011	Promoted for performance in the Chinese professional promotion tournament.
4 dan	2012	Promoted for performance in the Chinese professional promotion tournament.
5 dan		Skipped due to the Chinese Weiqi Association promotion rules.
6 dan		Skipped due to the Chinese Weiqi Association promotion rules.
7 dan		Skipped due to the Chinese Weiqi Association promotion rules.
8 dan		Skipped due to the Chinese Weiqi Association promotion rules.
9 dan	2015	Won the 2nd Bailing Cup against Qiu Jun.

== Career record ==
As of 7 February 2025

Year	Wins	Losses	Win %	Black Win %	White Win %
2008	5	8	38.4%	33.3%	42.8%
2009	10	12	45.4%	33.3%	60.0%
2010	14	12	53.8%	50.0%	56.2%
2011	20	18	52.6%	56.2%	50.0%
2012	47	30	61.0%	57.8%	64.1%
2013	52	28	65.0%	70.1%	52.1%
2014	63	17	78.7%	79.0%	78.3%
2015	75	18	80.6%	66.6%	93.7%
2016	65	24	73.0%	65.2%	81.3%
2017	72	29	71.2%	68.1%	73.6%
2018	50	31	61.7%	40.0%	82.9%
2019	62	22	73.8%	77.1%	71.4%
2020	47	14	77.0%	66.6%	85.2%
2021	33	16	67.3%	55.5%	81.8%
2022	26	18	59.0%	55.5%	61.5%
2023	67	34	66.3%	59.1%	73.0%
2024	48	21	69.5%	61.1%	78.7%
Total	756	352	68.2%	62.4%	73.8%

== Titles and runners-up ==
As of 1 January 2021

Ranks #5 in total number of titles in China and ranks #4 in total number of international titles.

Domestic
Title	Wins	Runners-up
Tianyuan		1 (2014)
Weifu Fangkai Cup	1 (2015)	
Liguang Cup	1 (2015)	
Baiyunshan Cup	1 (2015)	1 (2016)
Quzhou-Lanke Cup		2 (2016, 2018)
Ahan Tongshan Cup	2 (2014, 2016)	1 (2017)
National Games of PRC – Go Tournament	1 (2017)	
Longxing	2 (2017, 2018)	
Weiqi Rally Tournament	2 (2017, 2018)	
Xi'nan Wang	1 (2019)	
Qisheng	1 (2019)	
Changqi Cup	1 (2019)	
Wangzhong Wang	2 (2020, 2026)	
Total	14	5
Continental
Title	Wins	Runners-up
China-Japan Agon Cup	2 (2014, 2016)	
China-Japan Ryusei		1 (2018)
China-Japan-Korea Ryusei	1 (2019)	
Total	3	1
International
Title	Wins	Runners-up
Mlily Cup	1 (2016)	
Limin Cup	1 (2017)	
IMSA Elite Mind Games, Men's blitz	1 (2017)	
Xin'ao Cup	1 (2017)	
Samsung Cup	4 (2015, 2016, 2018, 2020)	
Bailing Cup	2 (2015, 2019)	1 (2016)
World Go Championship		1 (2019)
Total	10	2
Career Total
Total	27	8

== International competitions ==
Competitions	2013	2014	2015	2016	2017	2018	2019	2020	2021	2022	2023	2024
Ing Cup	-			QF	-			QF	-			SF
Samsung Cup	R16	×	W	W	R16	W	R16	W	R32	R32	×	R16
LG Cup	×	×	QF	R16	SF	R32	SF	RU	SF	QF	SF	RU
Mlily Cup	R32	-	W	-	R16	-	QF	-			R16	-
Chunlan Cup	-	×	-	3rd	-	3rd	-	QF	-	QF	-	R16
Lanke Cup	-										R32	R16
Nanyang Cup	-											R16
Bailing Cup	-	W	-	RU	-	W	-					
Xin'ao Cup	-				W	-						
Tianfu Cup	-					R32	-					
Nongshim Cup	×	×	1:0	0:0	0:1	0:0	1:0	0:1	0:1	0:1	0:1	2:1

(W) Winner; (RU) Runner-up; (SF) Semifinalist; (QF) Quarterfinalist; (R16) Round of 16; (R32) Round of 32; (R64) Round of 64.

- Note 1: Some competitions last for more than one year. Usually the beginning year of the competition is recorded as the year of competition.
- Note 2: A light green background indicates that the player is still competing in the game.
- Note 3: '×' means the player did not qualify for the game (or lost in the qualification round), while '-' means the competition was not held in that year.
- Note 4: The result of Nongshim Cup means the result of the player (matches won : matches lost). The result '0:0' means the player qualified for his/her national team of Nongshim Cup, and the team won before the player compete in the cup.
- Note 5: Among the international go competitions listed, only Chunlan Cup has a bronze medal match. Therefore, the semifinalists of Chunlan Cup are recorded '3rd' or '4th', while the semifinalists of the other international titles are recorded 'SF'.

== Head-to-head record vs selected players ==
As of 6 February 2025

Players who have won international Go titles in bold.

- (China) **Chen Yaoye** 17:11
- (South Korea) **Park Junghwan** 17:16
- (China) **Shi Yue** 20:10
- (China) **Tang Weixing** 16:11
- (China) **Fan Tingyu** 19:13
- (South Korea) **Lee Sedol** 13:5
- (China) **Tuo Jiaxi** 19:6
- (China) Fan Yunruo 10:6
- (China) Lian Xiao 17:6
- (South Korea) **Shin Jinseo** 11:16
- (South Korea) **Kim Jiseok** 7:9
- (China) **Tan Xiao** 11:8
- (China) **Mi Yuting** 15:12
- (China) Huang Yunsong 11:4
- (China) **Xie Erhao** 14:4
- (China) **Jiang Weijie** 6:8
- (China) Qiu Jun 5:6
- (China) Peng Liyao 11:4
- (China) **Zhou Ruiyang** 12:1
- (China) **Yang Dingxin** 11:7
- (South Korea) Lee Donghoon 6:3
- (China) **Gu Li** 9:0
- (China) **Li Qincheng** 7:6
- (China) Liao Xingwen 6:1
