= Park Junghwan =

South Korean Go player

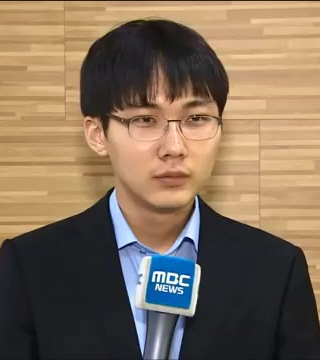
- 2016

Personal information
- Native name: 박정환 (Korean); 朴廷桓 (Korean)
- Born: 11 January 1993 (age 33) South Korea
- Height: 1.83 m (6 ft 0 in)

Sport
- Turned pro: 2006
- Teacher: Kweon Kab-yong
- Rank: 9 dan
- Affiliation: Hanguk Kiwon
Medal record
Men's Go
Representing South Korea
Asian Games
Gold medal – first place	2022 Hangzhou	Men's team
Gold medal – first place	2010 Guangzhou	Men's team
Gold medal – first place	2010 Guangzhou	Mixed pair

Park Junghwan (born 11 January 1993) is a South Korean professional Go player of 9-dan rank.

== Career ==
=== Early career ===
Park became a professional Go player in 2006. He won the Fujitsu Cup in 2011. Park defeated Lee Chang-ho to advance to the final of the 2012 Ing Cup, where he faced Fan Tingyu for the title. He lost three games to one. He won the 19th LG Cup in 2015, defeating Kim Ji-seok in the final, 2–1.

=== 2016-2017: Ing Cup runner-up ===
After a series of strong performances, in which during a span of 2 months he was able to defeat World No.1 Ke Jie in two consecutive international tournaments, namely the LG Cup and the Ing Cup, Park was able to reach the final of the latter, and the round of 8 in the former. Park faced Tang Weixing in the final of the 2016 Ing Cup, with the first two games being played in mid-August. The first 2 games of the Ing Cup were played, with Park winning the first by resignation whilst losing the second. In both games the margin of victory was small, but Park was able to produce a comeback in the second game, with Tang lamenting that he went wrong after the midgame.

Park's most recent results were the Bailing Cup, where despite his best efforts, he was not able to defeat the Chinese Tianyuan holder Chen Yaoye. During that game, both sides opened up securing territory and doing big territorial exchanges, but a slip-up by Park allowed Chen to win an important ko that ultimately led to loss of territory. Chen was then able to capitalize and win the game, thereby ending the Korean player's string of dominance in the international tournaments.

From 22 to 26 October 2016, Park contested the final 3 games of the 8th Ing Cup with former World Champion and one of China's highest ranked players, Tang Weixing, with the score standing at 1:1 (after the first 2 games were played in mid August). Despite Park winning the third game, and bringing the score to 2:1 and having 2 chances to win his first Ing Cup after losing the previous edition, Tang came from behind to win once with white (up to game 4 all games had been won by the player with the white stones), and once more with Black (by 5 points, after Ing komi was applied), thereby securing China's third Ing Cup victory out of 8, 2nd behind Korea who has 5. Park, however, was left with bitter disappointment for being the first player to lose 2 back to back Ing cup finals, despite also joining the ranks of a few well known pros of previous generations, such as compatriots Lee Chang-ho and Choi Cheol-han and former World Champion Chang Hao 9p of China, who had also played 2 finals. Incidentally, all 3 players listed above secured victories once over each of their rivals whilst losing to the other, spanning 3 consecutive Ing Cups from the 4th edition to 6th. The record between all of them is 1 Title, 1 runners up.

Park later played in the LG Cup quarterfinals on mid November (14th), where is opponent will be former world champion and 2x LG Cup winner Gu Li 9p. He defeated Gu Li by resign, but subsequently fell to another Chinese player Zhou Ruiyang 9p, thus ending his 2016–17 season.

=== 2017-2018 ===
Park won the 2017 World Go Championship, a special invitational tournament organized by the Nihon Ki-in, defeating Iyama Yuta, Japanese Go program DeepZenGo and Mi Yuting.

Park performed strongly in 3rd Mlily Cup, defeating Tuo Jiaxi, Zhou Ruiyang, Ke Jie, Chen Zijian and Xie Ke. His opponent in the finals will be Park Yeonghun 9p.

== Promotion record ==
Rank	Year	Notes
1 dan	2006	Promoted to professional dan rank after passing qualifying test.
2 dan	2007	
3 dan	2008	
4 dan	2009	Won the 4th Siptan against Baek Hongseok.
5 dan	2009	Won the 14th Chunwon against Kim Jiseok.
6 dan	2010	Won the 5th Siptan against Lee Changho.
7 dan	2010	Qualified for the 2nd BC Card Cup main tournament.
8 dan	2010	Skipped over due to the Hanguk Kiwon promotion rules.
9 dan	2010	Won the 2010 Asian Games, becoming the youngest Korean 9 dan at 17 years old.

== International competitions ==
Competitions	2007	2008	2009	2010	2011	2012	2013	2014	2015	2016	2017	2018	2019	2020	2021	2022	2023	2024	2025	2026
Ing Cup	-	×	-			RU	-			RU	-			R16	-			R16	-	
Samsung Cup	R16	R32	×	SF	×	SF	QF	SF	QF	QF	QF	R16	QF	R32	W	QF	SF	R32	SF	R16
LG Cup	×	×	×	R32	R32	R16	R32	W	R16	SF	R16	QF	RU	SF	QF	R16	R16	QF	QF	R16
Chunlan Cup	-	×	-	×	-	QF	-	QF	-	R16	-	W	-	R16	-	R16	-	RU	-	R16
Mlily Cup	-						R64	-	R16	-	W	-	R16	-			R64	-		R64
Kuksu Mountains	-											W	R16	-	R16	SF	R16	R16	R16	R16
Lanke Cup	-																R16	QF	×	QF
Nanyang Cup	-																	R32	-	
Sopalkosanol Cup	-																		RR	
Shinhan Cup	-																		W	
Asian TV Cup	×	×	×	×	QF	SF	RU	SF	RU	SF	×	SF	×	-						
Bailing Cup	-					QF	-	SF	-	QF	-	R16	-							
Xin'ao Cup	-										R64	-								
Tianfu Cup	-											SF	-							
Fujitsu Cup	×	×	×	R16	W	-														
Nongshim Cup	×	×	×	×	×	2:0	2:1	1:1	0:1	2:1	0:0	2:1	4:1	0:0	1:1	0:1	0:1	1:1	0:1	

(W) Winner; (RU) Runner-up; (SF) Semifinalist; (QF) Quarterfinalist; (R16) Round of 16; (R32) Round of 32; (R64) Round of 64; (RR) Round-robin.

- Note 1: Some competitions last for more than one year. Usually the beginning year of the competition is recorded as the year of competition.
- Note 2: The light green background indicates that the player is still competing in the competition.
- Note 3: '×' means the player did not participate (or lost in the qualification round), while '-' means the competition was not held in that year.
- Note 4: The result of Nongshim Cup means the result of the player (matches won : matches lost). The result '0:0' means the player qualified for his/her national team of Nongshim Cup, and the team won before the player compete in the cup.

== Titles & runners-up ==
As of 1 November 2020

=== Individual Titles ===
Ranks #5 in total number of individual titles in Korea and tied for #5 in total number of international titles.

Domestic
Title	Wins	Runners-up
Baduk Masters Fighting God	1 (2007)	
Siptan	2 (2009–2010)	
GS Caltex Cup	1 (2011)	
Prices Information Cup	1 (2013)	
Chunwon	2 (2009, 2014)	
Guksu	2 (2014–15)	
Myungin		1 (2016)
Maxim Cup	3 (2012–13, 2017)	1 (2014)
KBS Cup	5 (2011–2013, 2016, 2018)	3 (2014–15, 2019)
Crown Haitai Cup	1 (2018)	
Baduk TV Cup	1 (2019)	
Yongseong	1 (2019)	1 (2020)
Korea Strongest Player		1 (2020)
Total	20	7
Continental
Title	Wins	Runners-up
China-Korea Tengen	1 (2010)	
Total	1	0
International
Title	Wins	Runners-up
Fujitsu Cup	1 (2011)	
Asian TV Cup		2 (2013, 2015)
Ing Cup		2 (2013, 2016)
LG Cup	1 (2015)	1 (2020)
IMSA Elite Mind Games, Men's Blitz		1 (2017)
Mlily Cup	1 (2018)	
Kuksu Mountains Championship	1 (2018)	
World Go Championship	3 (2017–19)	
Chunlan Cup	1 (2019)	
Total	8	6
Career total
Total	29	13

=== Team Titles ===
Title	Wins	Runners-up
Asian Games, Men's Team	1 (2010)	
Asian Games, Mixed Double	2 (2010)	
SportAccord World Mind Games, Team		1 (2011)
SportAccord World Mind Games, Men's Team	1 (2013)	
Nongshim Cup	1 (2013)	4 (2014–2017)
IMSA Elite Mind Games, Mix Double	1 (2016)	
IMSA Elite Mind Games, Men's Team	1 (2017)	
Total	7	5
