= MLily Cup =

International Go competition

The MLily Cup (Chinese: 梦百合杯), officially the MLily Meng Baihe Cup World Go Open Tournament (Chinese: 梦百合杯世界围棋公开赛) is an international Go tournament. It is organized by the International Go Federation and the Chinese Weiqi Association. The tournament was created in 2013 and is held every two years.

== Overview ==
The MLily Cup is played under Chinese rules with a 7.5 point komi. Each player has 2 hours of main time and five 60-second byoyomi periods, except in the finals, where the main time is 3 hours instead. The tournament has 64 players in a single-elimination format, with best-of-3 semifinals and best-of-5 finals. The winner receives 1.8 million RMB in prize money, and the runner-up receives 600,000 RMB.

== Past tournaments ==
The 1st MLily Cup was won by 17-year-old Mi Yuting, his first international title, defeating Gu Li.

The 2nd MLily Cup champion was 18-year-old Ke Jie, his third world championship within a span of one year. In the fifth and final game, Ke Jie as Black won on a half-point ko which counted toward his score under Chinese rules, but would not have by Japanese counting.

In the 3rd MLily Cup, the organizers included Japanese Go AI DeepZenGo as a participant, a move which attracted some controversy; it was the first time a computer program was ever invited to an international Go tournament. DeepZenGo won in the first round against Shin Min-jun, and was eliminated in the second round by Wang Haoyang. The winner of the tournament was Park Junghwan.

The 4th MLily Cup started in 2019 and, after delays due to the COVID-19 pandemic, concluded in May 2021. It was the first major world tournament finals to be played face-to-face after the pandemic. Both finalists Mi Yuting and Xie Ke were Chinese, which helped avoid difficulties with international travel. Mi Yuting won the tournament for the second time.

Li Xuanhao won the 5th MLily Cup.

== Winners and runners-up ==
Edition	Years	Winner	Score	Runner-up
1st	2013	(China) Mi Yuting	3–1	(China) Gu Li
2nd	2015–2016	(China) Ke Jie	3–2	(South Korea) Lee Sedol
3rd	2017–2018	(South Korea) Park Junghwan	3–0	(South Korea) Park Yeong-hun
4th	2019–2021	(China) Mi Yuting	3–2	(China) Xie Ke
5th	2023–2024	(China) Li Xuanhao	3–1	(China) Dang Yifei

=== By nation ===
Nation	Winners	Runners-up
China	4	3
South Korea	1	2
