= Ryo Ichiriki =

Japanese Go player

Personal information
- Native name: 一力 遼 (Japanese)
- Full name: Ryo Ichiriki
- Born: 10 June 1997 (age 29) Sendai, Japan

Sport
- Turned pro: 2010
- Rank: 9 dan
- Affiliation: Nihon Ki-in
Medal record
Men's Go
Representing Japan
Asian Games
| Bronze medal – third place | 2022 Hangzhou | Men's team |

Ryo Ichiriki (一力 遼, Ichiriki Ryō; born 10 June 1997) is a Japanese professional 9-dan Go player. As Go player, he was a pupil of So Kofuku. Since 2020 he has also worked as a journalist for Kahoku Shimpo.

== Early life ==
Ichiriki was born in 1997 in Sendai into a wealthy family which has run media companies. His grandfather, Kazuo Ichiriki, then CEO of Kahoku Shimpo and Tohoku Broadcasting Company, was a big fan of Go and taught him how to play the game. Ichiriki took Go lessons from other local amateur players too.

Ichiriki went to Nihon Ki-in Go School as professional candidate from his childhood, first visited the school from Sendai, later from Tokyo. He moved to Tokyo with his mother in 2008.

In Summer 2010 he was qualified as Go professional.

== Go player ==
In 2014, he won the 1st Globis Cup, an international U-20 tournament held annually in Japan.

He won his first title in a top-seven Japanese Go competition at the 45th Gosei in 2020, defeating Naoki Hane 3–0 in the title match. The same year, he won the 46th Tengen title in a 3–2 victory over Yuta Iyama to take his second major title.

In 2021, he finished in the top four in the 9th Ing Cup, after being defeated by Xie Ke in the semifinal.

In 2024, he won the Ing Cup with a 3-0 in the final against Xie Ke. This marked the first major international title for a Japanese player in more than 20 years.

=== International competitions ===
| Competitions | 2014 | 2015 | 2016 | 2017 | 2018 | 2019 | 2020 | 2021 | 2022 | 2023 | 2024 | 2025 | 2026 |
|---|---|---|---|---|---|---|---|---|---|---|---|---|---|
| Ing Cup | - | | × | - | | | SF | - | | | W | - | |
| Samsung Cup | × | × | × | × | × | × | QF | × | R16 | × | R32 | × | × |
| LG Cup | × | × | R16 | R32 | R16 | × | R32 | QF | × | × | × | RU | R16 |
| Mlily Cup | - | R64 | - | × | - | QF | - | | | R32 | - | | R16 |
| Chunlan Cup | × | - | R32 | - | R32 | - | × | - | R32 | - | R16 | - | |
| Kuksu Mountains | - | | | | R16 | × | - | × | R16 | × | QF | × | × |
| Lanke Cup | - | | | | | | | | | × | R64 | × | × |
| Shinhan Cup | - | | | | | | | | | | | QF | |
| Asian TV Cup | × | QF | × | SF | × | QF | - | | | | | | |
| Nongshim Cup | 1:1 | 3:1 | 1:1 | 0:1 | 0:1 | 0:1 | 0:1 | 0:1 | 0:1 | 0:1 | 0:1 | 0:1 | |

(W) Winner; (RU) Runner-up; (SF) Semifinalist; (QF) Quarterfinalist; (R16) Round of 16; (R32) Round of 32; (R64) Round of 64.

- Note 1: Some competitions last for more than one year. Usually the beginning year of the competition is recorded as the year of competition.
- Note 2: The light green background indicates that the player is still competing in the competition.
- Note 3: '×' means the player did not participate (or lost in the qualification round), while '-' means the competition was not held in that year.
- Note 4: The result of Nongshim Cup means the result of the player (matches won : matches lost). The result '0:0' means the player qualified for his/her national team of Nongshim Cup, and the team won before the player compete in the cup.

=== Titles ===
International:

- Ing Cup 2024
- Globis Cup 2014 (under-20 tournament)

Major domestic titles:

- Kisei 2022–2025
- Meijin 2024–2025
- Ōza 2025
- Tengen 2020, 2023–2025
- Honinbo 2023–2025
- Gosei 2020

Other domestic tournaments won:

- Wakagoi Cup 2013, 2016
- Shinjin-O 2014
- Ryusei 2016, 2018, 2019, 2020
- Agon Kiriyama Cup 2018, 2023, 2024, 2025
- NHK Cup 2019, 2021, 2022, 2024
- Okage Cup 2020
- Teikei Cup Shunei 2023

== Journalist ==
Alongside his professional Go career, Ichiriki enrolled in the Waseda University School of Social Sciences in 2016. He graduated in 2020 and began working at Kahoku Shimpo, his family's newspaper. He is a journalist at its Tokyo branch office. However, his main focus is still his career as a Go player.
