= Toramaru Shibano =

Japanese go player (b. 1999)

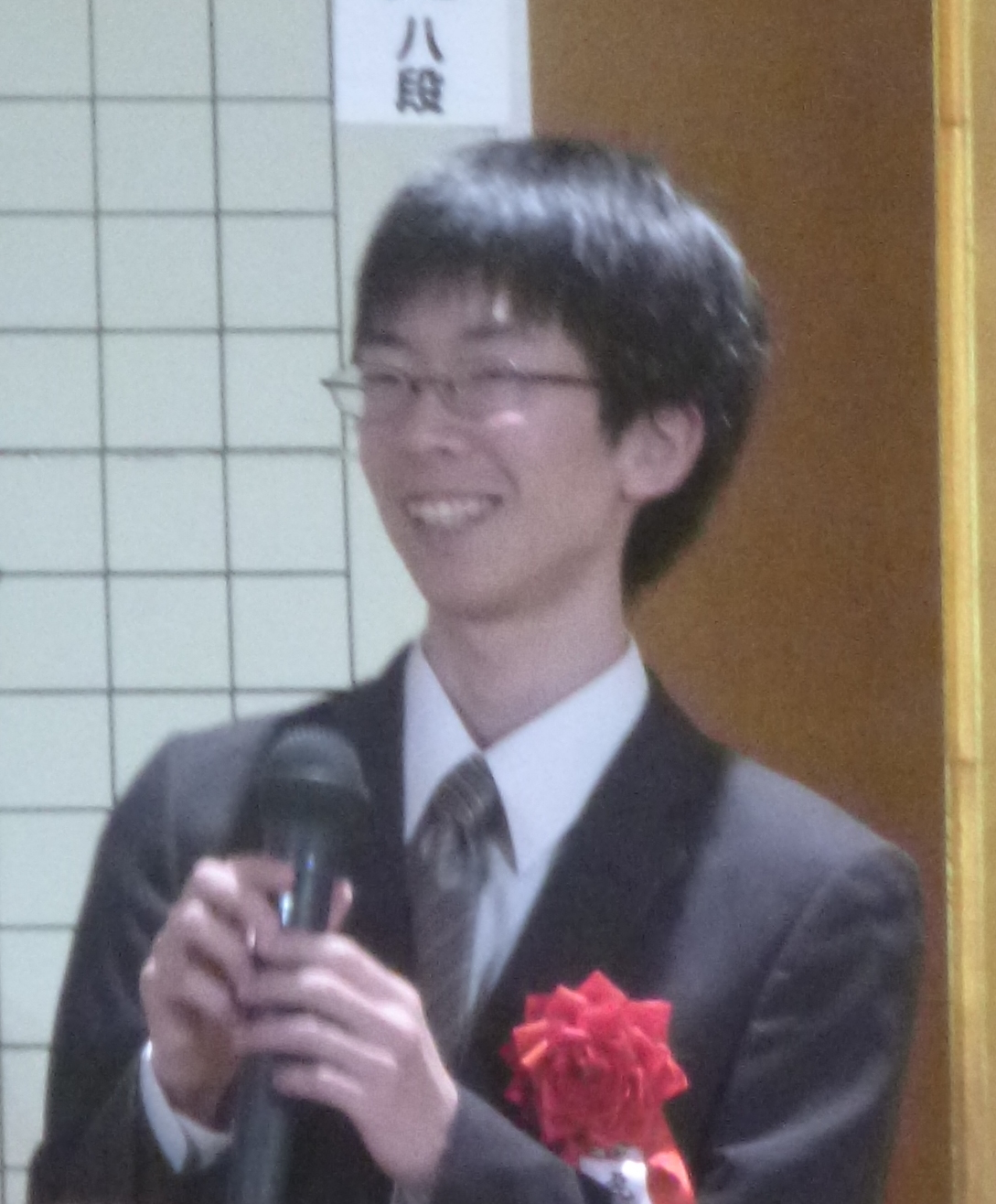
- Shibano in 2019

Personal information
- Native name: 芝野 虎丸 (Japanese)
- Full name: Toramaru Shibano
- Born: 9 November 1999 (age 26) Kanagawa, Japan

Sport
- Turned pro: 2014
- Rank: 9 dan
- Affiliation: Nihon Ki-in

Toramaru Shibano (芝野 虎丸, Shibano Toramaru; born 9 November 1999) is a Japanese Go professional who won the prestigious Meijin tournament in 2019 at age 19, becoming the first teenager to achieve one of the seven major Japanese titles.

== Early life ==
Shibano Toramaru was born 9 November 1999 in Kanagawa prefecture, Kantō region, Japan. He plays for the Tokyo branch of the Japanese Go Association (also known as the Nihon Ki-in) and is ranked as a 9 dan professional.

He says that he started to play Go under the influence of his parents who were fans of Hikaru no Go, a Japanese manga series based on the game.

== Career ==
Shibano became a shodan in September 2014 and rose quickly after scoring notable successes. In 2015 he progressed to two dan following 30 professional wins and in 2016 he became a three dan. In 2019 he achieved professional nine dan rank after securing the Meijin title.

In September 2017, as a result of winning the Ryusei tournament in August (where he beat Yo Seiki 7P), he was promoted to seven dan. In the same year Shibano became the youngest ever player to win a seat in the Honinbo league. At 17 years 11 months, he became the youngest player to win a seat in the Meijin League. In October 2017 Shibano also won the 42nd Shinjin-O, beating Son Makoto 5P [孫喆].

Shibano's successes continued in 2018, including winning the 4th Japan-China Ryusei tournament in April (beating Ke Jie 9P) and coming second in the 25th Agon Cup in October (to Ichiriki Ryō 8P).

On 8 October 2019, Shibano won the Japanese Meijin tournament, defeating Cho U 4–1, becoming the first teenage player to have won one of the seven major Japanese titles and achieving the rank of 9P.

Recently he has also won two other major Japanese titles: the Oza and the Judan.
