= Shin Jin-seo =

South Korean Go player (born 2000)

Personal information
- Native name: 신진서 (Korean); 申眞諝 (Korean)
- Born: 17 March 2000 (age 26) Busan, South Korea
- Height: 1.80 m (5 ft 11 in)

Sport
- Turned pro: 2012
- Rank: 9 dan
- Affiliation: Hanguk Kiwon
Medal record
Men's Go
Representing South Korea
Asian Games
Gold medal – first place	2022 Hangzhou	Team
Bronze medal – third place	2022 Hangzhou	Individual

Shin Jin-seo (Korean: 신진서; born 17 March 2000) is a South Korean professional Go player. He has won ten major international championships: the LG Cup in 2020, 2022 and 2024; the Chunlan Cup in 2021; the Samsung Cup in 2022; the Ing Cup in 2023; the Quzhou-Lanke Cup in 2024 and 2026; the Nanyang Cup in 2025, and the Sopalkosanol World Top Player Championship in 2025. He is the number one ranked Korean player in the Korea Baduk Association's official rankings, a spot which he first reached in November 2018 and has held continuously since January 2020.

== Career ==
Shin Jin-seo began playing professionally in July 2012. In January 2013, he defeated Lee Chang-ho (9 dan) in a young players vs legends exhibition match. Shin was promoted to 2 dan in November 2013.

He won the Let's Run Park Cup and the Shinin-Wang title, both in 2015. In 2017, he won the Globis Cup and won the Korean Baduk League with his team, Team Jungkwangjang. He won the 31st Asian TV Cup, defeating Ding Hao in June 2019.

In January 2019, Shin was defeated by South Korean Go program HanDol. The program defeated the top five South Korean go players. HanDol has been compared to AlphaGo, but is considered to be weaker.

Shin reached 9 dan in 2018.

In 2020, he defeated Park Junghwan at the LG Cup.

He won the 13th Chunlan Cup in 2021, his second major international title, with a 2–0 victory over Tang Weixing in the finals. In 2022, he defeated Yang Dingxin 2–0 to win the LG Cup for the second time. He also won the 2022 Samsung Cup after finishing as the runner-up the two previous years.

In 2025 Shin Jinseo won the 1st Sopalkosanol World Top Player Championship, a biennial international league-based tournament. Shin Jinseo defeated Tu Xiaoyu 2-1 in the three game championship match, marking the first championship match won by Shin Jinseo where he also incurred a loss.

== International competitions ==
Competitions	2014	2015	2016	2017	2018	2019	2020	2021	2022	2023	2024	2025	2026
Ing Cup	-		×	-			W	-			R16	-	
Samsung Cup	×	×	R16	QF	QF	QF	RU	RU	W	QF	QF	R16	SF
LG Cup	×	×	SF	QF	R16	W	R16	W	SF	W	R16	R16	SF
Chunlan Cup	×	-	×	-	R24	-	W	-	SF	-	R16	-	
Mlily Cup	-	×	-	R64	-	R32	-			R16	-		
Kuksu Mountains	-				QF	SF	-	RU	W	RU	RU	×	W
Lanke Cup	-									RU	W	RU	W
Nanyang Cup	-										W	-	
Sopalkosanol Cup	-											W	
Shinhan Cup	-											QF	
Bailing Cup	R64	-	SF	-	RU	-							
Xin'ao Cup	-			QF	-								
Tianfu Cup	-				RU	-							
Asian TV Cup	×	×	RU	×	×	W	-						
Nongshim Cup	×	×	×	0:1	×	0:1	5:0	4:0	1:0	6:0	2:0	3:0	

(W) Winner; (RU) Runner-up; (SF) Semifinalist; (QF) Quarterfinalist; (R16) Round of 16; (R32) Round of 32; (R64) Round of 64.

- Note 1: Some competitions last for more than one year. Usually the beginning year of the competition is recorded as the year of competition.
- Note 2: The light green background indicates that the player is still competing in the competition.
- Note 3: '×' means the player did not participate (or lost in the qualification round), while '-' means the competition was not held in that year.
- Note 4: The result of Nongshim Cup means the result of the player (matches won : matches lost). The result '0:0' means the player qualified for his/her national team of Nongshim Cup, and the team won before the player compete in the cup.

== Books ==
- My Go Journey. From Basics to Brilliance, 2025, Board N Stones, ISBN 978-3-98794-024-8
