= Wang Xinghao =

Chinese professional Go player

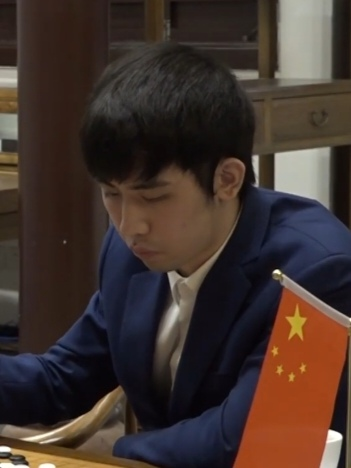

Personal information
- Full name: 王星昊
- Born: 2 February 2004 (age 22) Shanghai, China

Sport
- Turned pro: 2016
- Rank: 9 dan

Wang Xinghao (Chinese: 王星昊; born 2 February 2004) is a Chinese professional Go player of 9 dan rank. He is currently ranked #1 in China. He became a professional in 2016, and was formerly considered the strongest teenage player in the world until turning 20. He won the World Youth Go Championship in 2015. After studying at a Go club in Shanghai, he went on to study at Go schools in Beijing and Hangzhou. He achieved 8th dan in 2023 and 9th dan the same year.

== Promotion record ==
Rank	Year	Notes
1 dan	2016	
2 dan		
3 dan		
4 dan		
5 dan		
6 dan		
7 dan		
8 dan	2023	
9 dan	2023	
