= Line 4 (Ningbo Rail Transit) =

Metro line in Ningbo, China

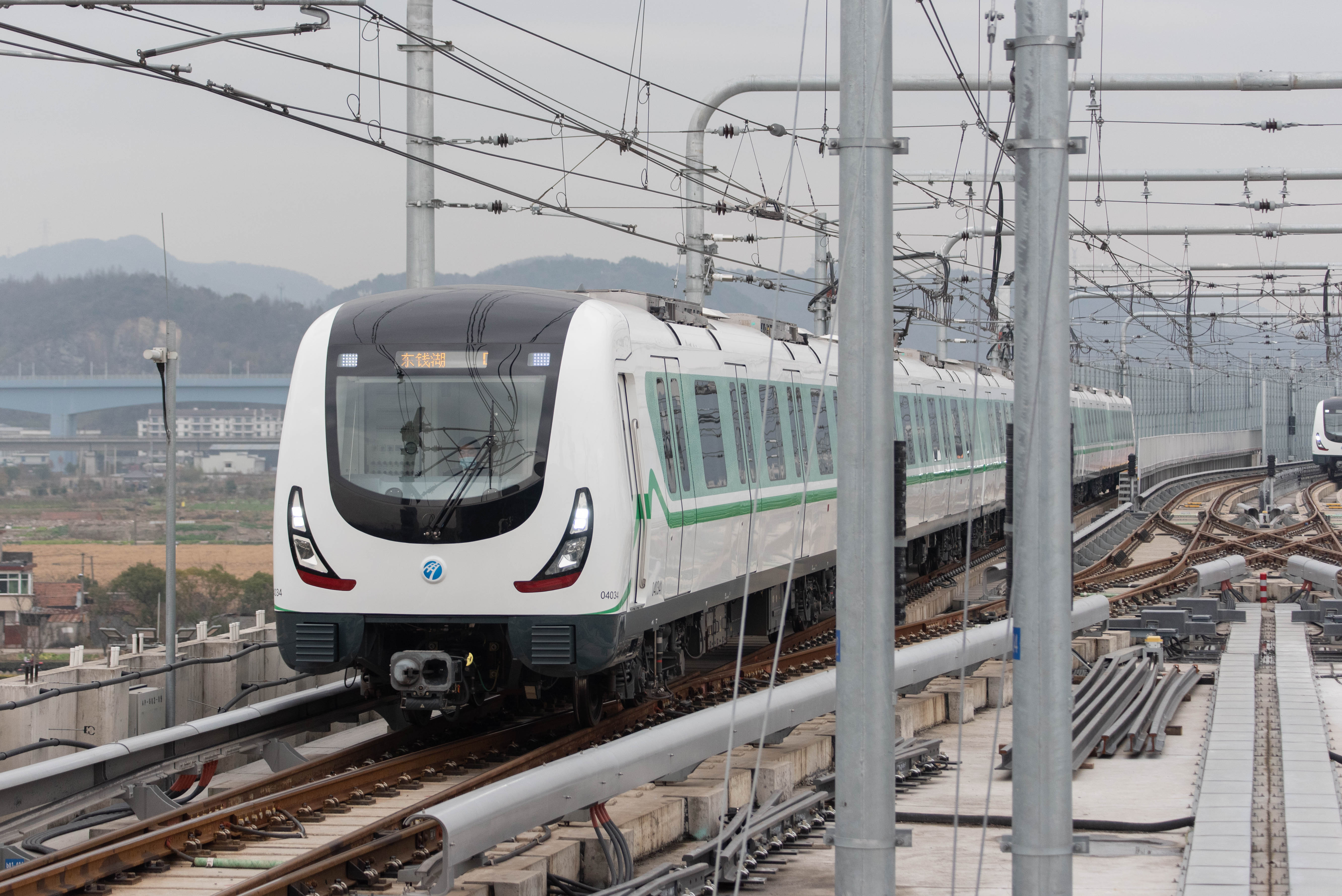
- Line 4 Train at Guanshanhe Station

Overview
- Status: Operational
- Owner: Ningbo
- Locale: Ningbo, Zhejiang, China
- Termini: Cicheng West; International Conference Center
- Stations: 27

Service
- Type: Rapid transit
- System: Ningbo Rail Transit
- Operator(s): Ningbo Rail Transit Co., Ltd.

History
- Opened: 23 December 2020; 5 years ago

Technical
- Line length: 39.73 km (24.69 mi)
- Number of tracks: 2
- Character: Underground / Elevated
- Track gauge: 1,435 mm (4 ft 8 1/2 in) standard gauge
- Electrification: 1,500 V DC overhead catenary (+ third rail return)
Route map

Line 4 of Ningbo Rail Transit (Chinese: 宁波轨道交通4号线) is a rapid transit line in Ningbo. It starts from Cicheng Town, Jiangbei District, and ends near Ningbo International Conference Center in Yinzhou District. The project was approved on November 5, 2013 and opened on December 23, 2020. Construction of Line 4 started in 2011 with the groundbreaking of the North Ring Elevated Expressway with the second deck of the structure being used for Line 4 trains. The rest of the line started construction on November 30, 2015. The line will initially use 36 sets of six car B-type trains with a maximum service speed of 80 km/h (50 mph).

== Route ==
Line 4 initially starts from Cicheng Station in Cicheng Town in east–west direction as an elevated line. Then it turns south into the North Outer Ring Expressway where it turns east–west running under the elevated expressway forming a three level structure similar to the northern section of Shanghai Metro Line 1. After reaching Jiangbei Avenue, it starts to turn underground and deviates from the viaduct to Zhuangqiao Railway Station where it turns south, crosses Yaojiang River and reaches Ningbo Railway Station. Then Line 4 goes along Changchun Road, Xingning Road until it reaches Canghai Road and become north–south again. After reaching Shounan Road it turns into southeast direction and reaches Dongqian Lake, its destination.

The Phase 3 of Ningbo Rail Transit includes both western and eastern extensions of line 4. The western extension is a 1.77 km long section with a new station Cicheng West, while eastern extension is 2.37 km with a new station International Conference Center. Eastern extension started construction on 25 February 2021, and western on 22 November 2022. Western extension opened on 10 January 2025. Eastern extension opened on 16 May 2025.

== Stations ==
- OSI: Out of System Interchange

Station name		Connections	Distance km		Location
English	Chinese	Connections	Distance km		Location
Cicheng West	慈城西		-	0	Jiangbei
Cicheng	慈城		1.77		Jiangbei
Guanshanhe	官山河		4.15		Jiangbei
Changxing Road	长兴路		5.70		Jiangbei
Jinshan Road	金山路		7.02		Jiangbei
Olympic Sports Center	奥体中心		9.04		Jiangbei
Hongtang Middle Road	洪塘中路		10.42		Jiangbei
Hongda Road	洪大路	8	12.43		Jiangbei
Zhuangqiao Railway Station	庄桥火车站	ZQH	13.65		Jiangbei
Lijiang Road	丽江路		15.23		Jiangbei
Shuangdong Road	双东路		16.70		Jiangbei
Cuibaili	翠柏里	6 (OSI) (Note: Due to passageway directly connected 2 lines not opened, transfer outside the station area is required.)	18.03		Haishu
Daqing Bridge	大卿桥	1	19.32		Haishu
Liuxi	柳西		20.07		Haishu
Ningbo Railway Station	宁波火车站	2 NGH ( Yongyu )	21.28		Haishu
Xingning Bridge West	兴宁桥西		22.31		Haishu
Xingning Bridge East	兴宁桥东		23.30		Yinzhou
Baihe	白鹤		24.29		Yinzhou
Children's Park	儿童公园	3	25.54		Yinzhou
Ailiu	矮柳		26.43		Yinzhou
Panhuo Road	潘火路		28.02		Yinzhou
Songjiang East Road	嵩江东路		29.69		Yinzhou
South Higher Education Park	南高教园区	5	30.80		Yinzhou
Jinda South Road	金达南路		33.07		Yinzhou
Xiaoyangjiang	小洋江	7 Ningxiang (12)	35.25		Yinzhou
Dongqian Lake	东钱湖		37.36		Yinzhou
International Conference Center	国际会议中心	8	39.73		Yinzhou
