= Olympic Sports Center station (Ningbo Rail Transit) =

Railway station in Ningbo, China

Olympic Sports Center 奥体中心
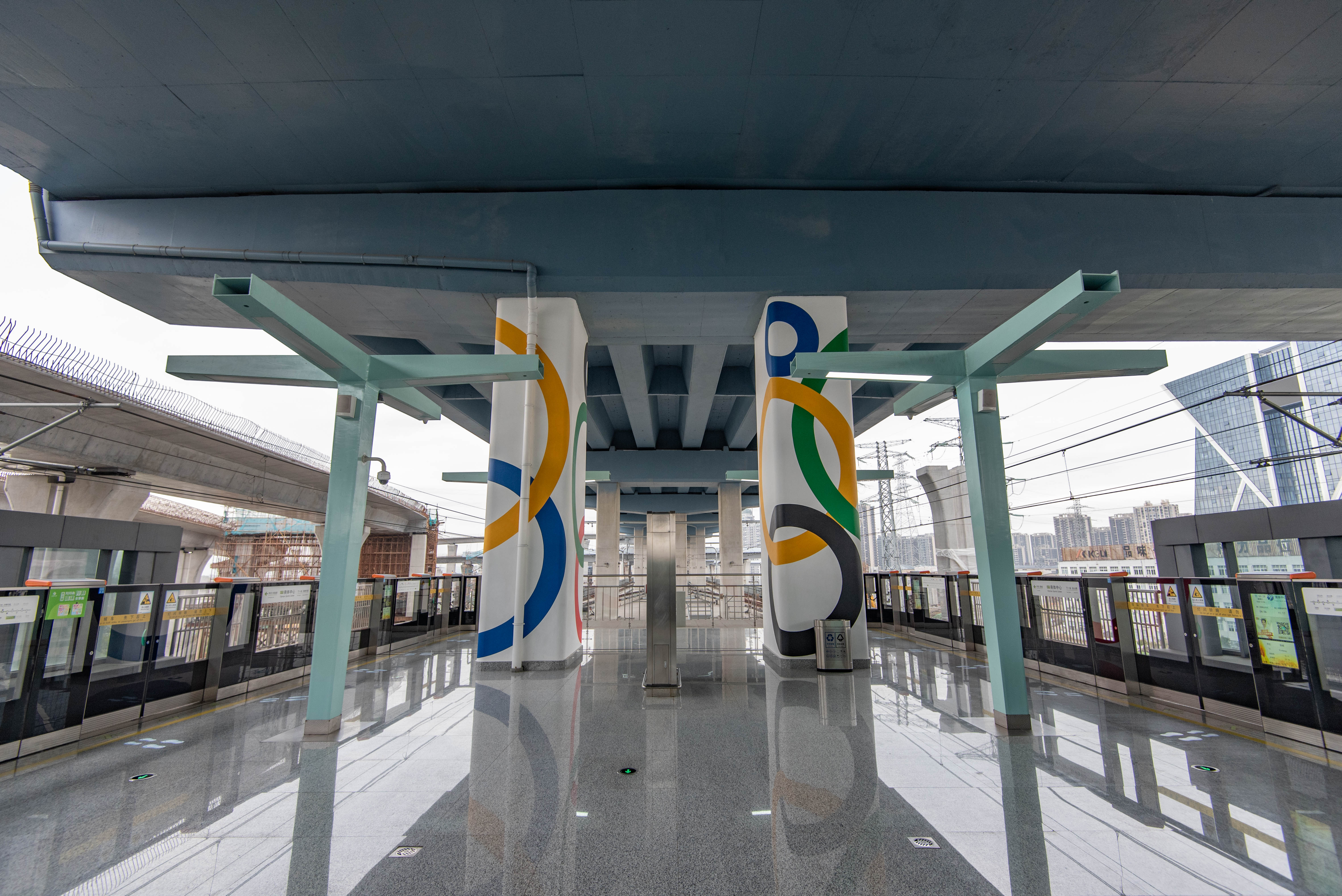

General information
- Location: Beihuan West Road × Kaiyuan Road; Jiangbei District, Ningbo, Zhejiang; China
- Coordinates: 29°56′12″N 121°29′09″E
- Operator: Ningbo Rail Transit Co. Ltd.
- Line: Line 4
- Platforms: 2 (1 island platform)

Construction
- Structure type: Elevated

History
- Opened: 23 December 2020
- Former names: Guangyuan Road

Services
Preceding station	Ningbo Rail Transit	Following station
Jinshan Road towards Cicheng West	Line 4	Hongtang Middle Road towards International Conference Center
Location

Olympic Sports Center station, formerly called Guangyuan Road station during planning, is a station on Line 4 of Ningbo Rail Transit. It is an elevated three-story subway station with an island platform. The station is served for Line 4 as a destination terminal which was started to construct since 2015.

== Platform style ==
Olympic Sports Center station is located in Jiangbei District, immediately below Beiwaihuanlu (Northern Outer Ring Road) elevated road. The station is an elevated island platform station with following characteristics: 120m length, 20.6m width for the station and 12.8m width for the platform. The total construction area is 7,555 sq meters.

== Exits ==
It has been set four exits.
