= Guanshanhe station =

Metro station in Ningbo, China

Guanshanhe Station 官山河站
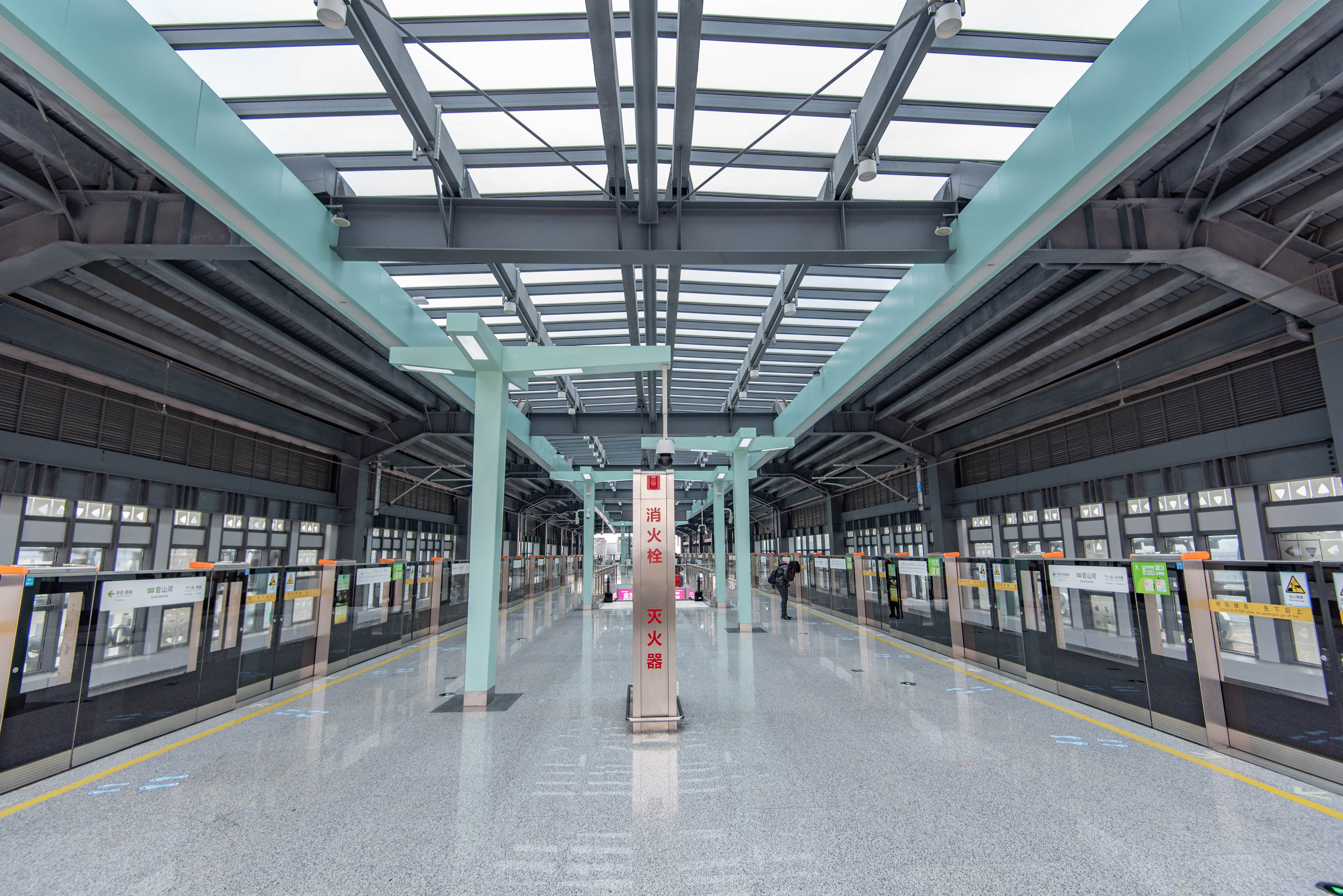

General information
- Location: Jiangbei District, Ningbo, Zhejiang; China
- Coordinates: 29°57′49″N 121°27′20″E
- Operator: Ningbo Rail Transit
- Line: Line 4
- Platforms: 2 (1 island platform)

Construction
- Structure type: Elevated
- Accessible: yes

Services
Preceding station	Ningbo Rail Transit	Following station
Cicheng towards Cicheng West	Line 4	Changxing Road towards International Conference Center
Route map
- To Cicheng
- To Changxing Rd
Location

Guanshanhe Station, formerly known as Cicheng New City Station during construction, is an elevated subway station in Ningbo. The name of this station is because of neighbouring Shazigang (also named as Guanshanhe or Guanshan River), serving as Line 4 in Ningbo Rail Transit. Construction of this station began in 2015. The station opened on 23 December 2020.

== Style ==
Guanshanhe Station is located in Cicheng connecting road, near Cishui East Street, Jiangbei District. The station is an elevated 3-story island platform station, with following characteristics: 120m lengths and 19m widths. The platform has widths in a range from 9.22m to 10m. The total construction area is 7702 sq meters.

== Exits ==
It has 3 exits.
