= Xie Ke =

Chinese Go player (born 2000)

Personal information
- Native name: Xiè Kē (Pinyin)
- Born: January 14, 2000 (age 26) Ningbo, Zhejiang, China

Sport
- Turned pro: 2013
- Rank: 9 dan
- Affiliation: Zhongguo Qiyuan

Xie Ke
- Traditional Chinese: 謝科
- Simplified Chinese: 谢科
Transcriptions
Standard Mandarin
- Hanyu Pinyin: Xiè Kē

Xie Ke (Chinese: 谢科; pinyin: Xiè Kē; born 14 January 2000) is a Chinese professional Go player.

== Career ==
Xie became a professional 1 dan in 2013, finishing in first place in the pro qualification tournament.

In 2017, he finished in the top four in the 3rd MLily Cup, after being eliminated by Park Junghwan in the semifinal.

In a series of games played by Chinese Go AI "Golaxy" against 41 top Go players in May 2018, Xie won his game against Golaxy. This was the only victory by a human player; Golaxy finished the series with a 40–1 win–loss record. Golaxy played as White with no komi. A similar 30-game series in the previous month had resulted in a 28–2 record for Golaxy.

In 2021, he became a finalist in both the 4th MLily Cup and 9th Ing Cup; reaching the finals in two major international Go tournaments earned him promotion to 9 dan. He finished as the runner-up in both, with a 3–2 loss to Mi Yuting in the MLily Cup final later that year, and a 2–0 loss to Shin Jinseo in the Ing Cup final which was played in 2023. He is a finalist again in the 10th Ing Cup in 2024.
