= Baoguo Temple (Zhejiang) =

Buddhist temple in Zhejiang, China

Coordinates: 29°58′57″N 121°30′58″E

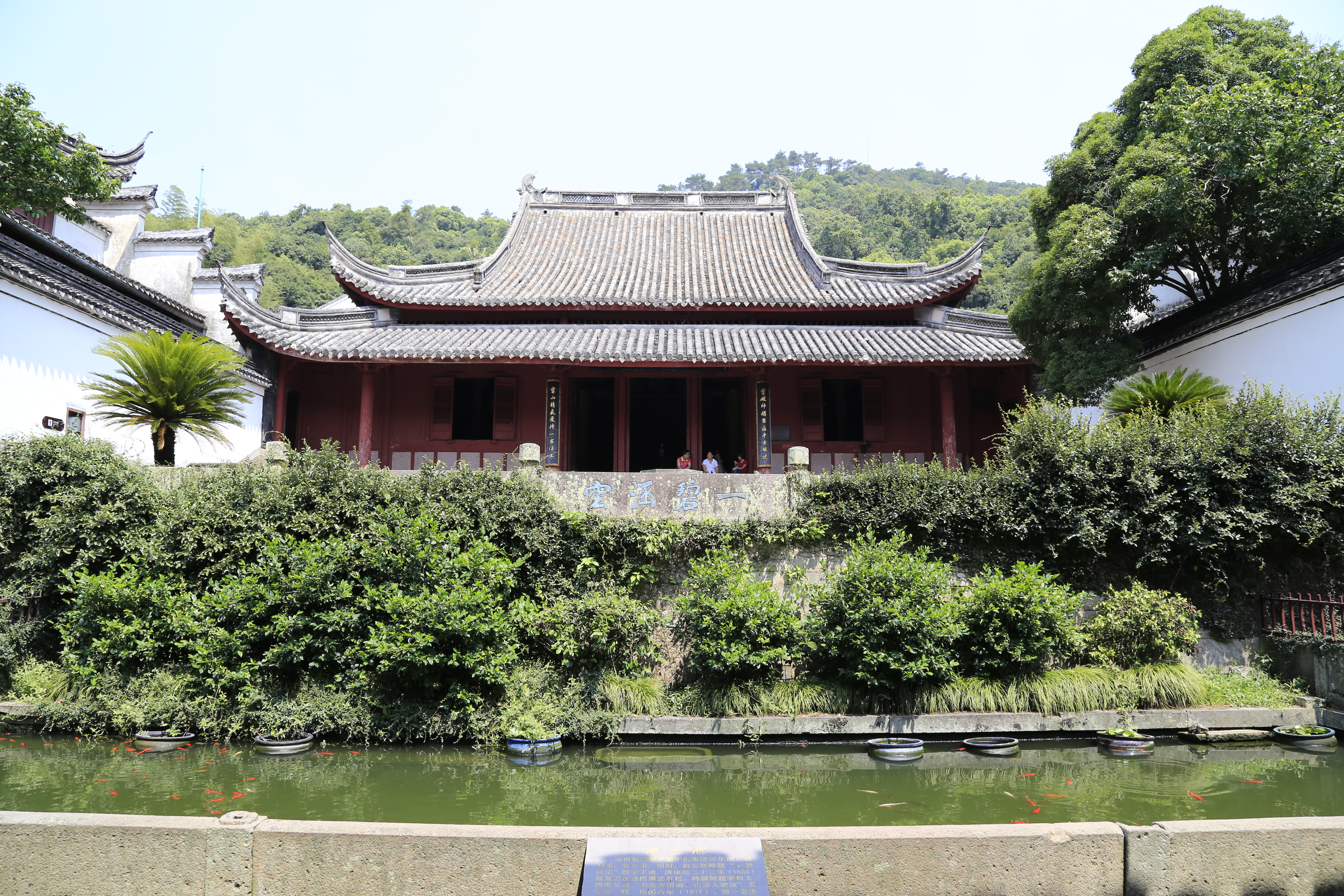
Ningbo Baoguo Si 2013.07.27 10-24-13

The Baoguo Temple (simplified Chinese: 保国寺; traditional Chinese: 保國寺; pinyin: Bǎoguó Sì; lit. 'Protect country Temple', Wugniu: pau koq zy, Wu Chinese pronunciation: [pɔ koʔ zz̩]) is a Chinese Buddhist temple located in the Jiangbei district, 15 kilometres (9.3 mi) north of Ningbo City, in Zhejiang Province, People's Republic of China. It is noted as the 2nd confirmed oldest completely wooden structure in southern China since the main hall of the present temple dates back to 1013 AD during the Northern Song dynasty.

== History ==
The temple was originally called the Lingshan Temple (simplified Chinese: 灵山寺; traditional Chinese: 靈山寺; pinyin: Língshān Sì; lit. 'Temple of Divine Mountain', Wugniu: lin se zy, Wu Chinese pronunciation: [lin sɛ zz̩]), but in 880 AD, during the Tang dynasty it was renamed the Baoguo Temple. The main hall was rebuilt in 1013 AD, during the Northern Song dynasty, and is one of the oldest and most well preserved wooden constructions in China. The temple also contains columns and eaves dating to the Tang dynasty.

Today the temple is no longer a temple but a tourist attraction, and many of its rooms and halls are used to house various exhibitions, including:

- Guanyin statues
- Confucian bronzes
- Ningbo furniture
- Traditional Chinese wedding attire
- Carved stone screens
- Miscellaneous architectural pieces from the temple compound
- Famous places around China
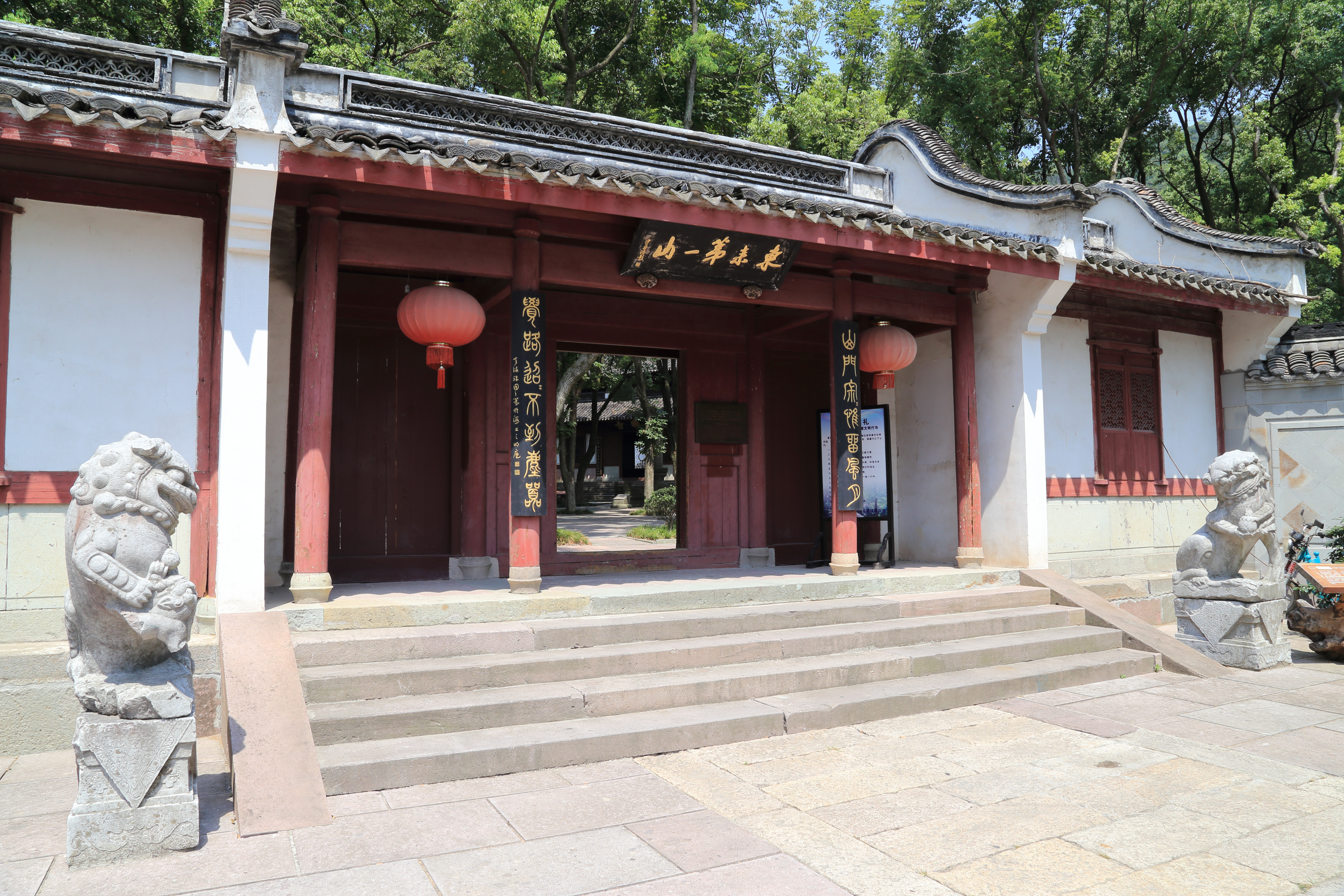

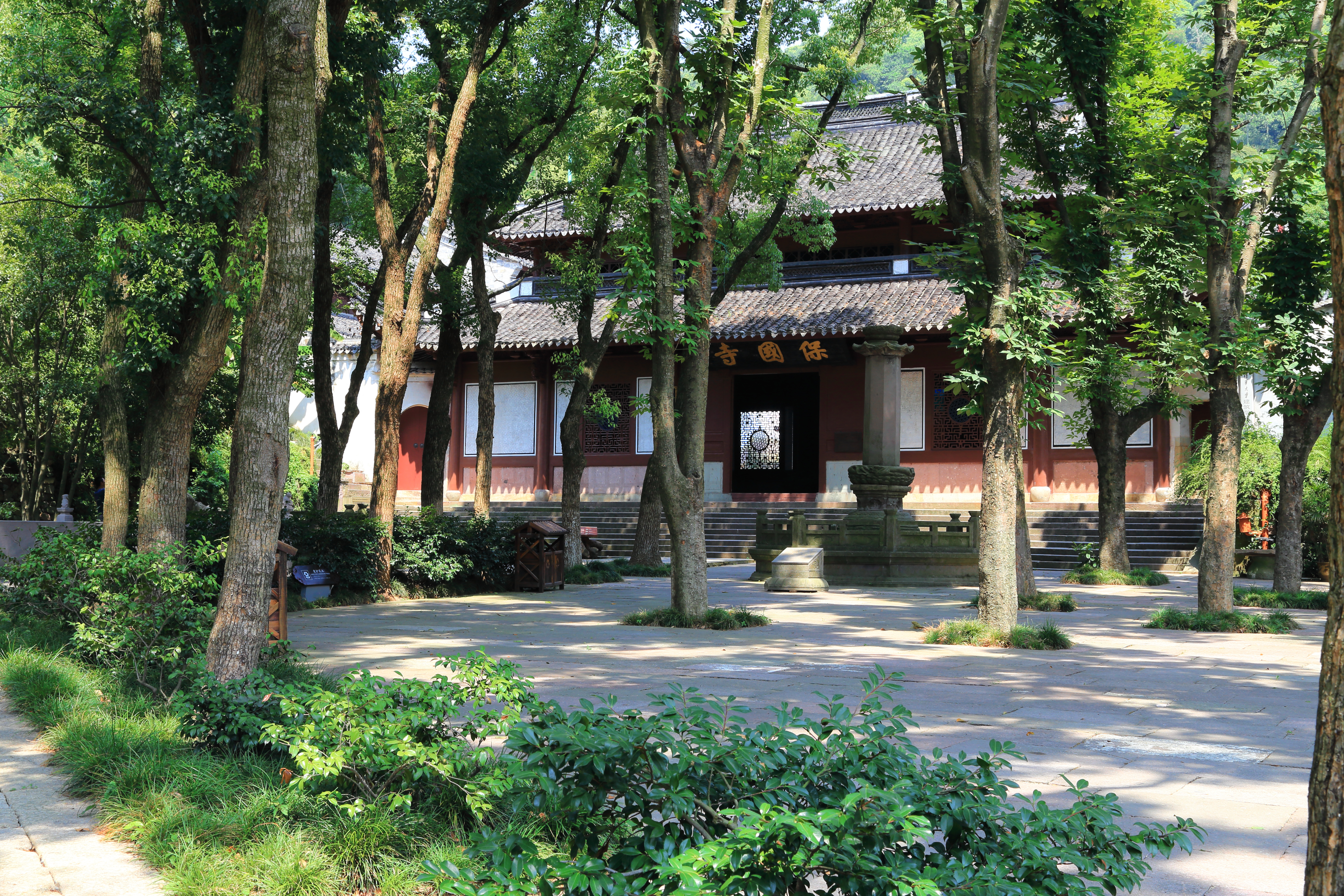

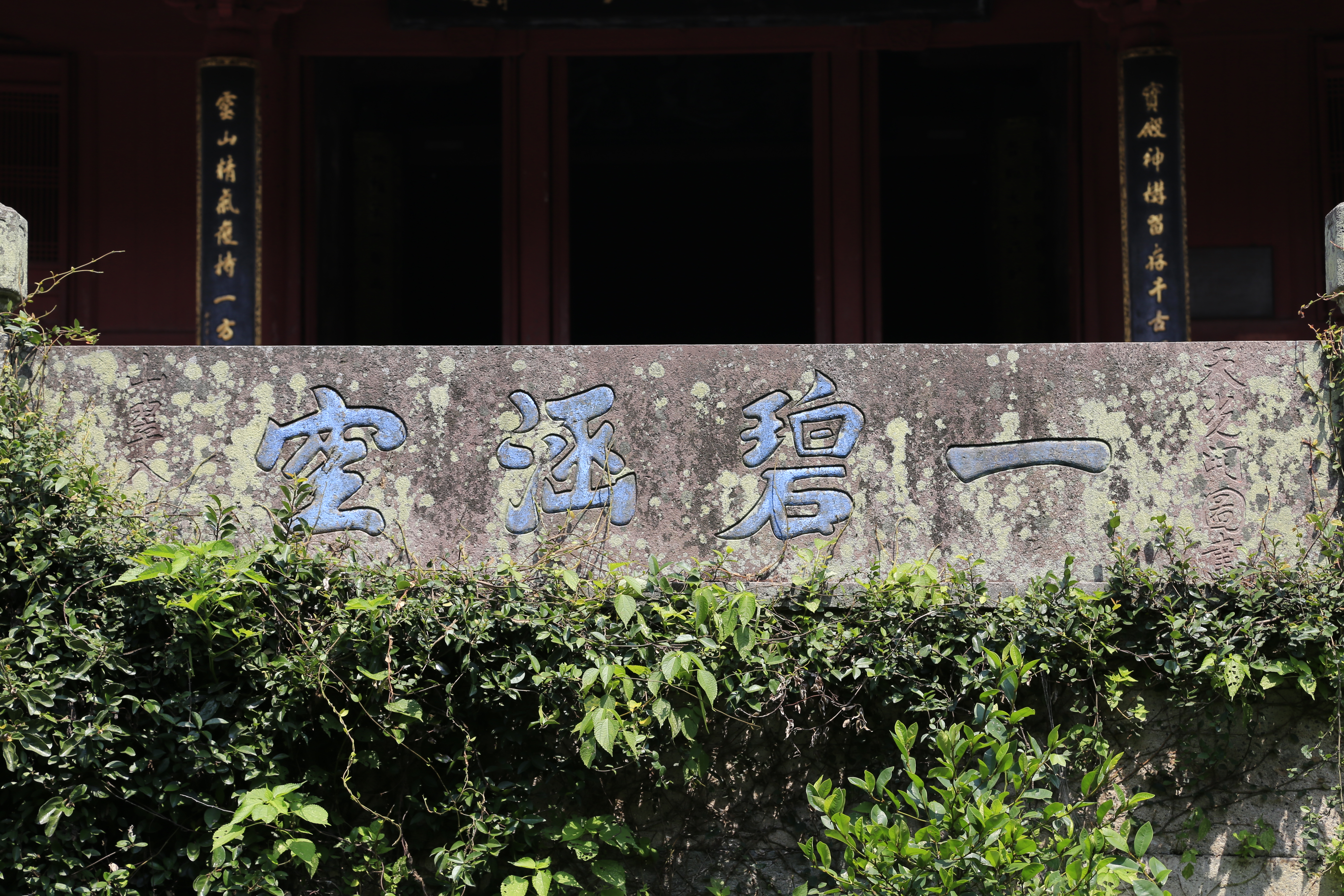

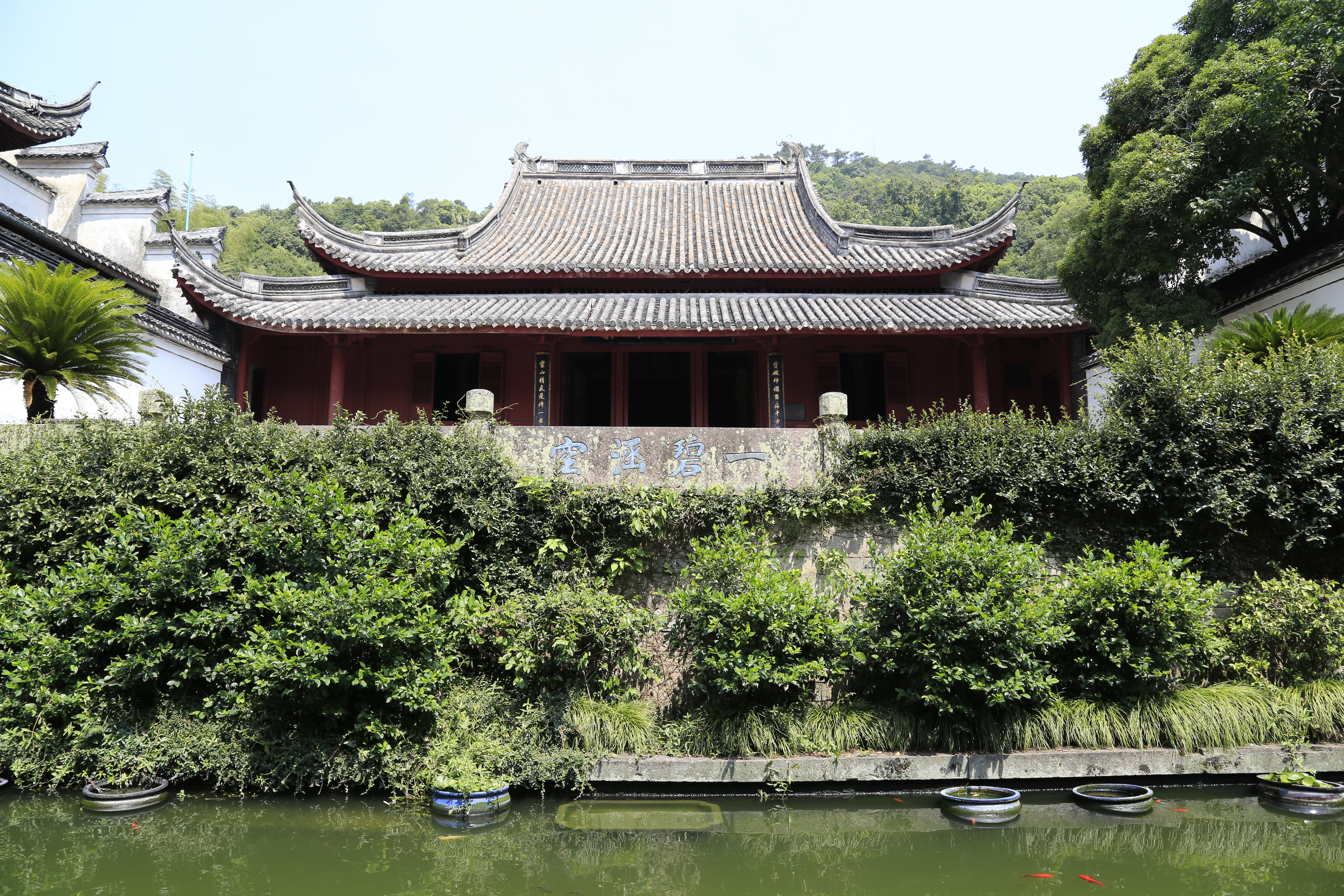

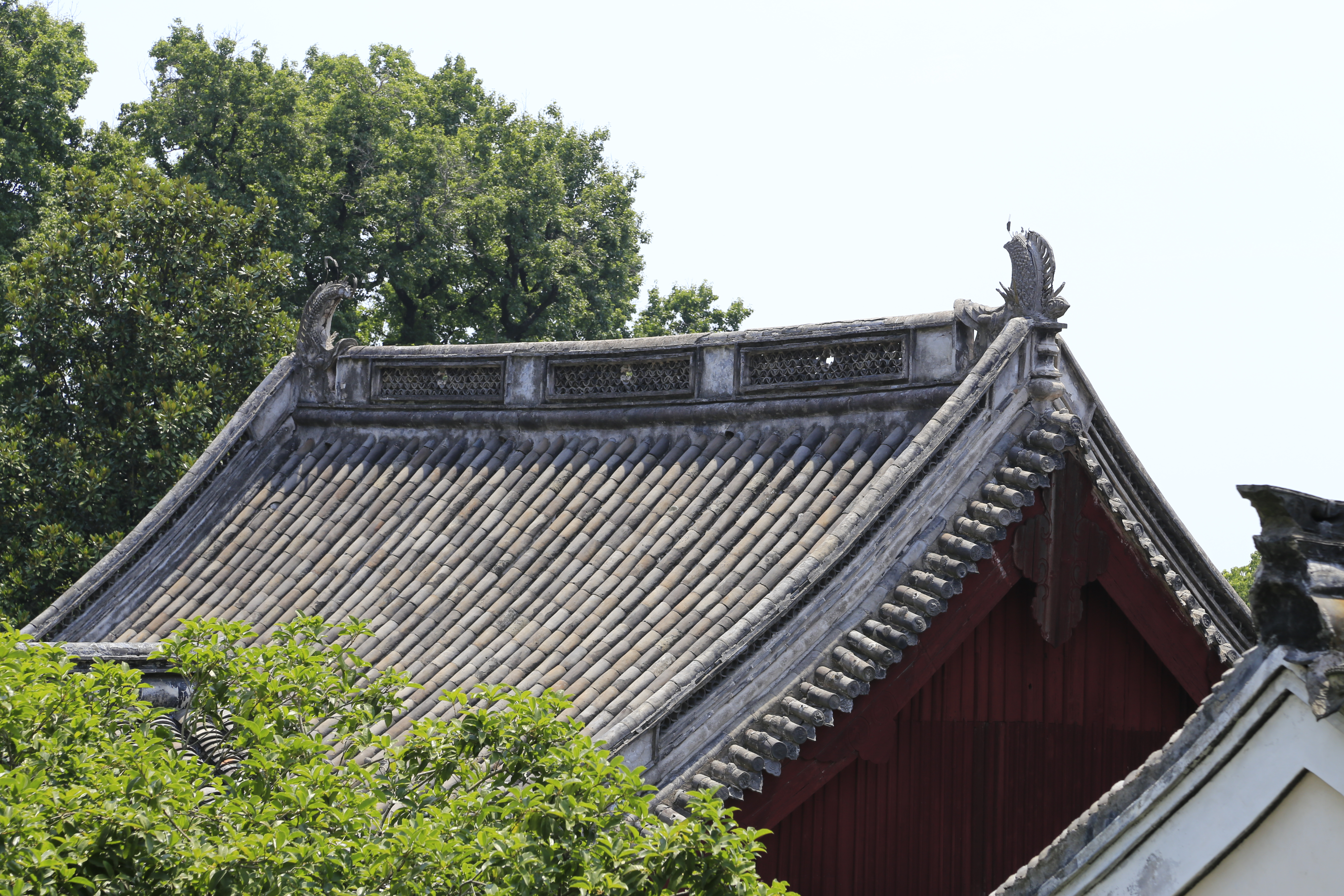

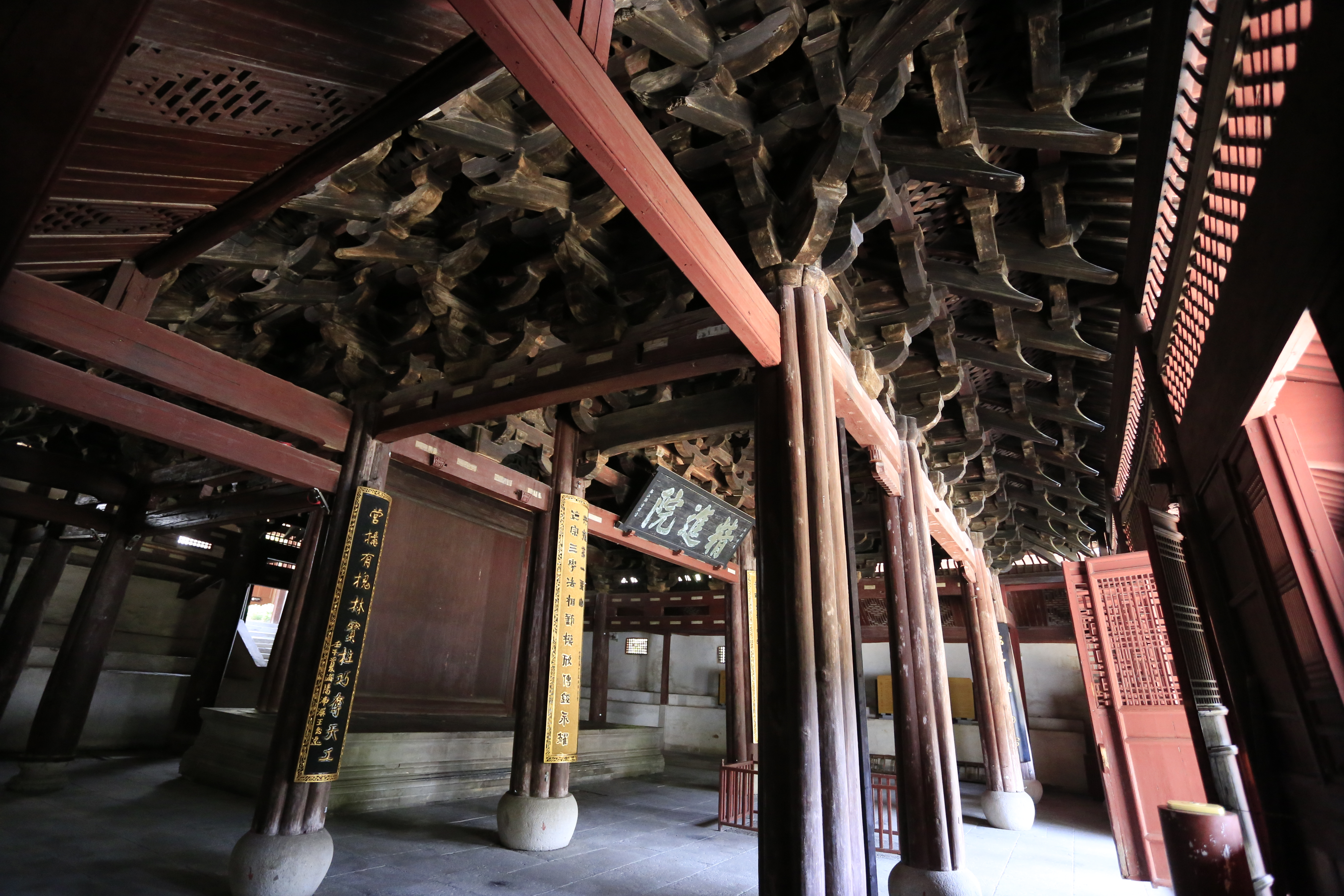

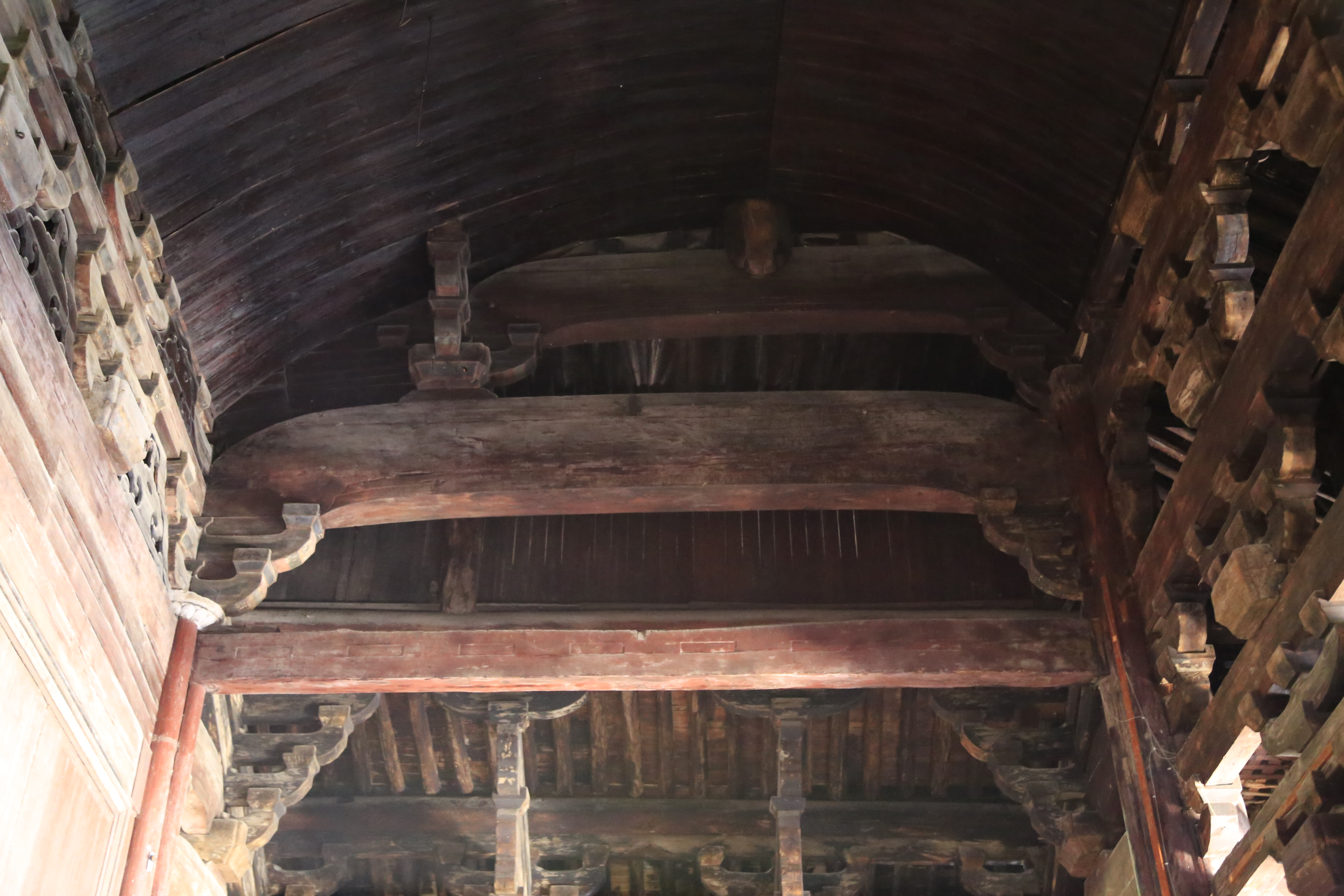

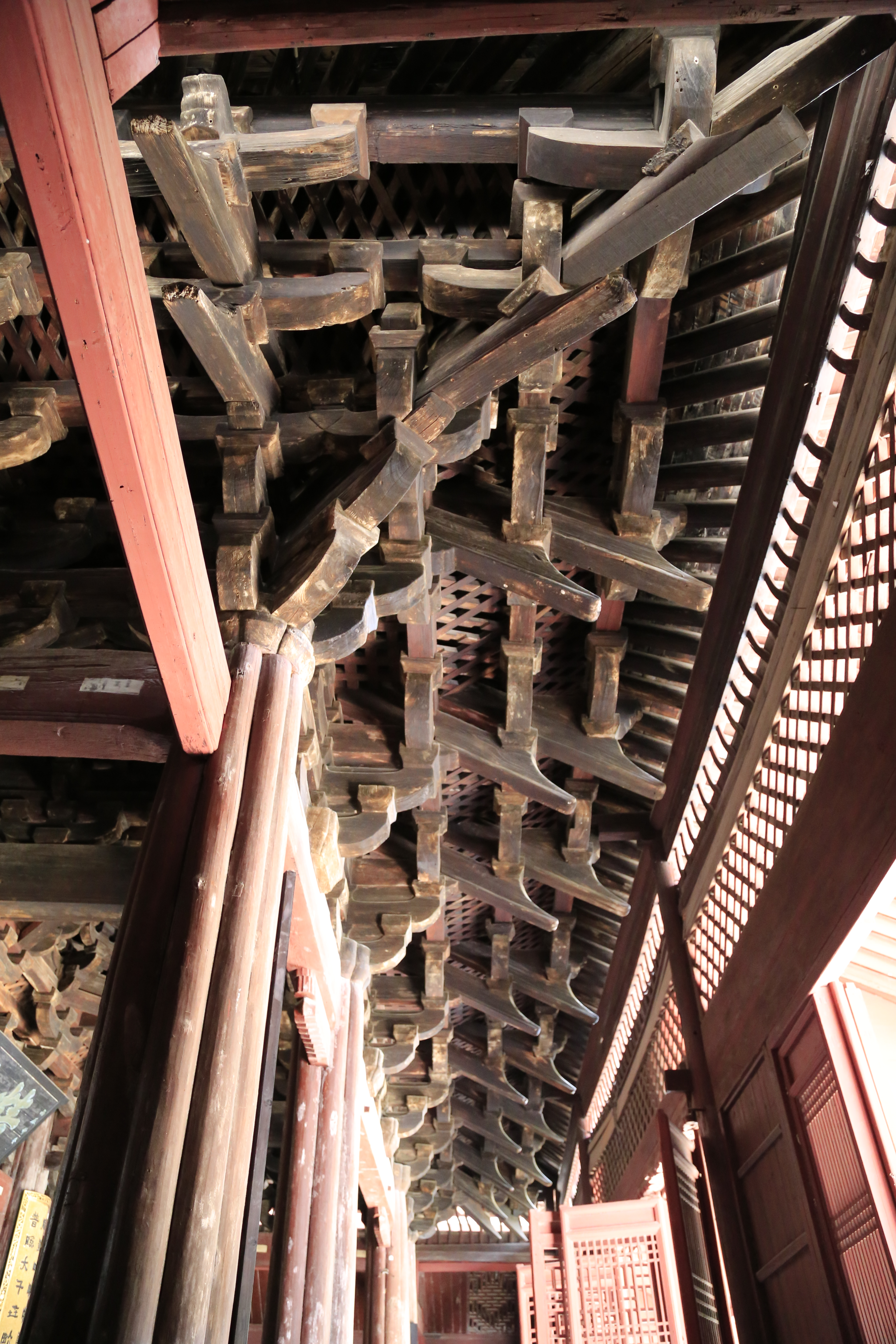

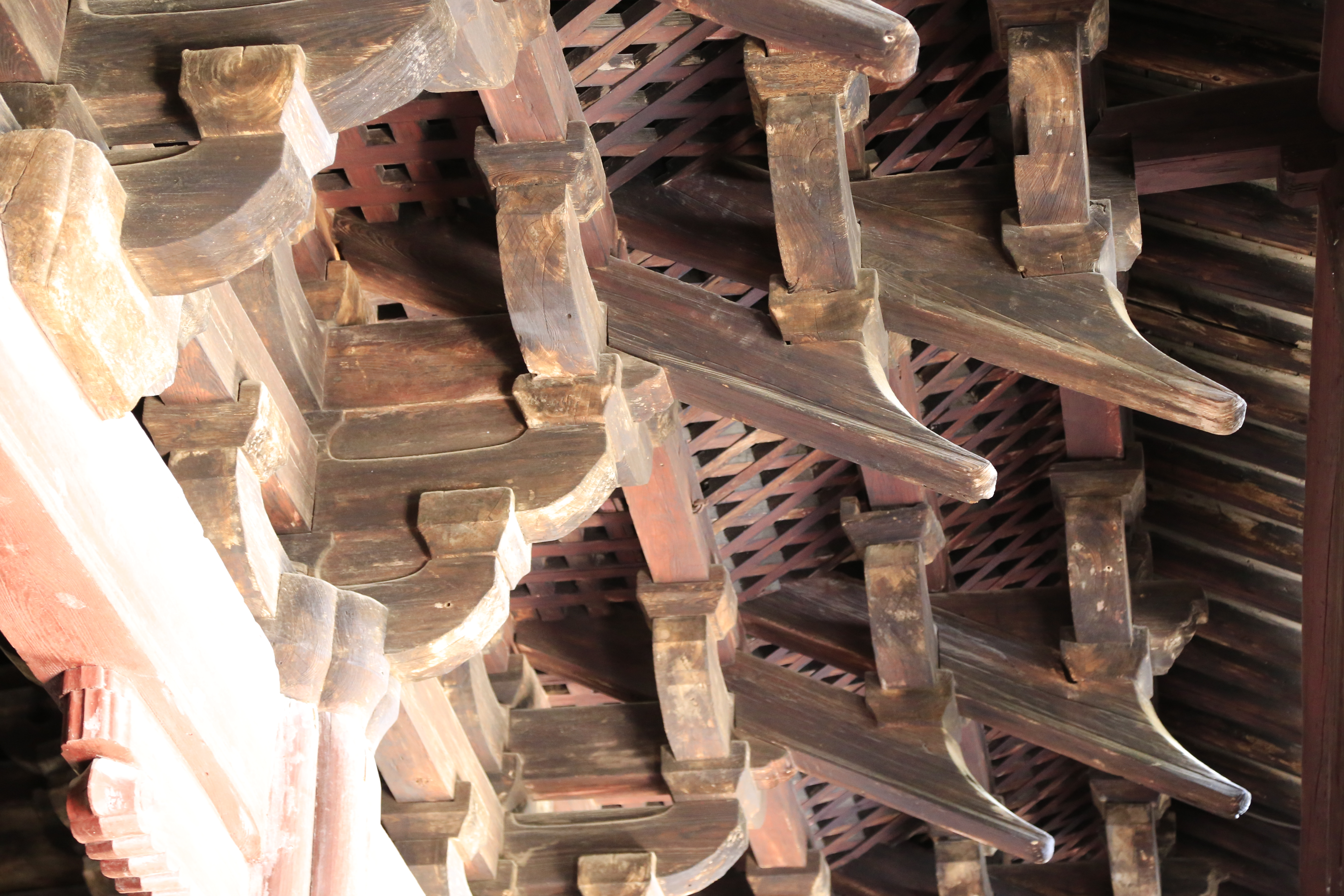

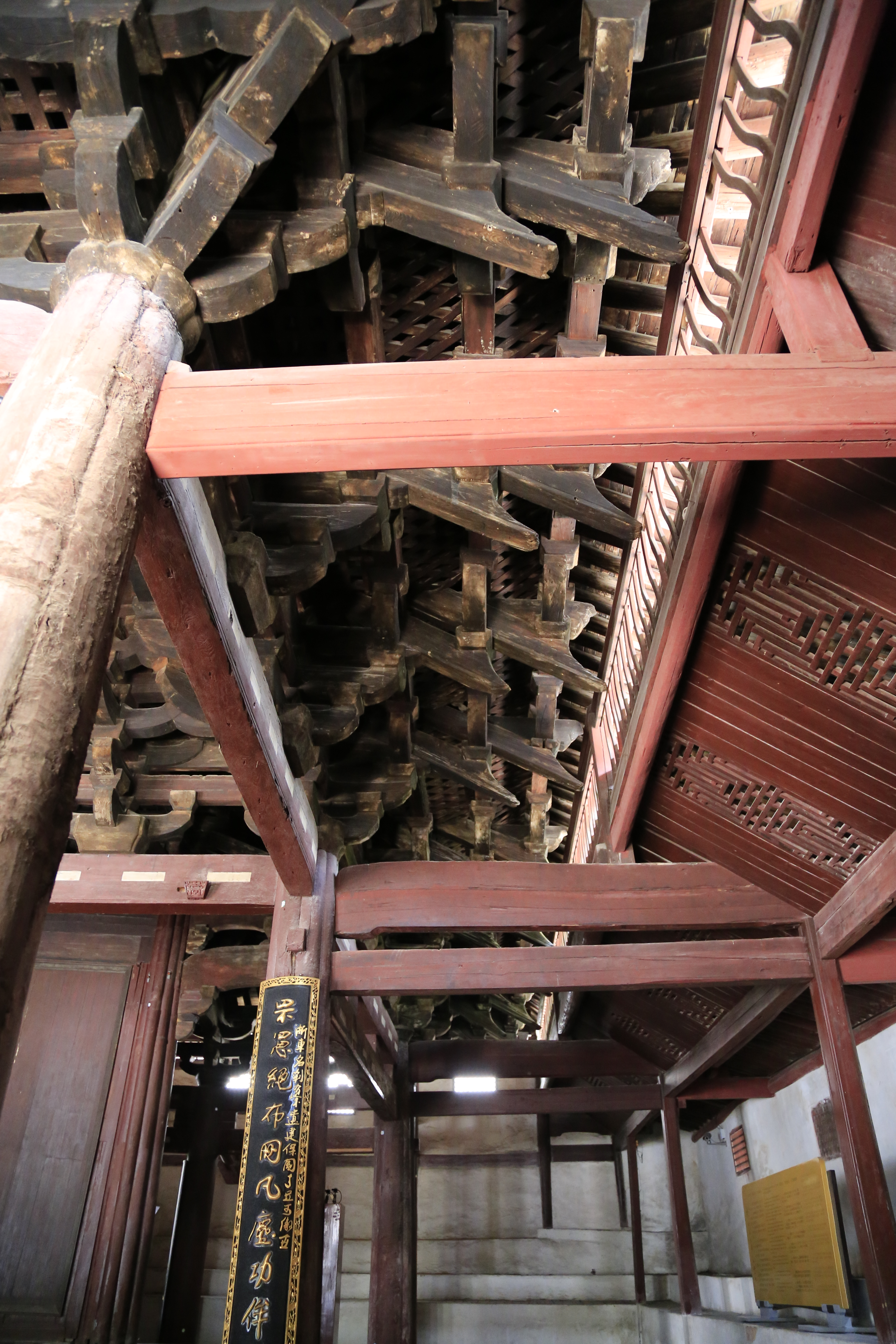

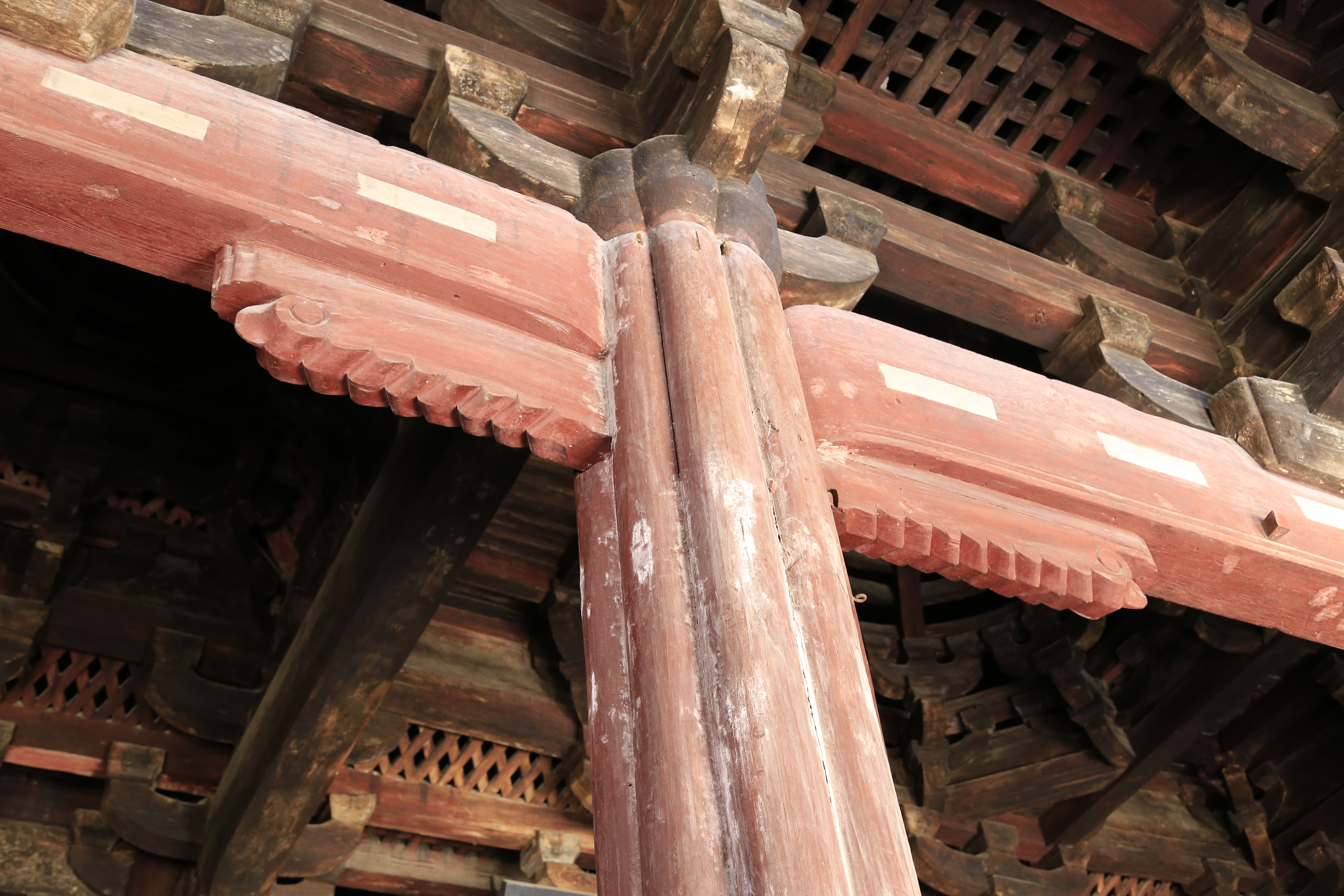

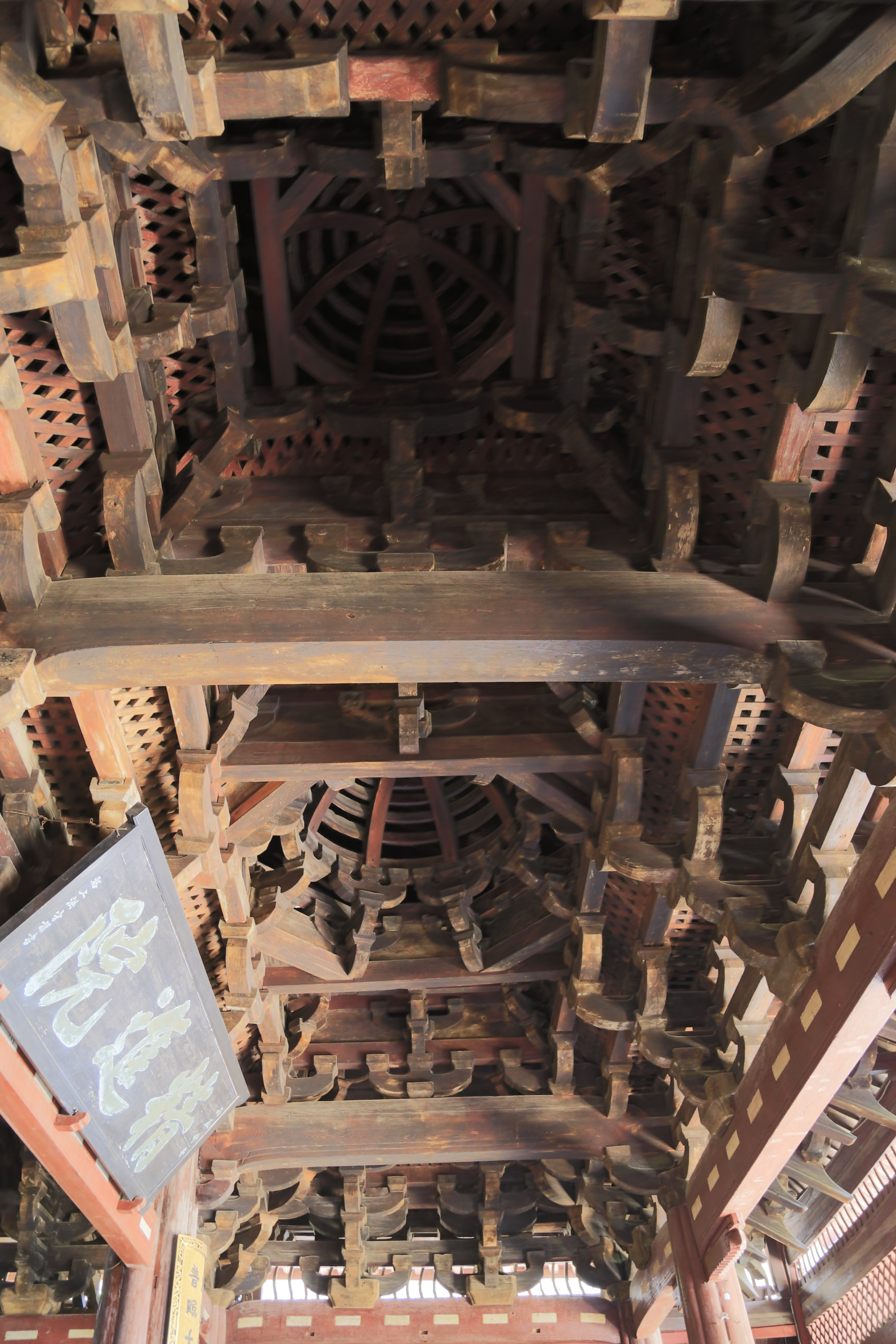

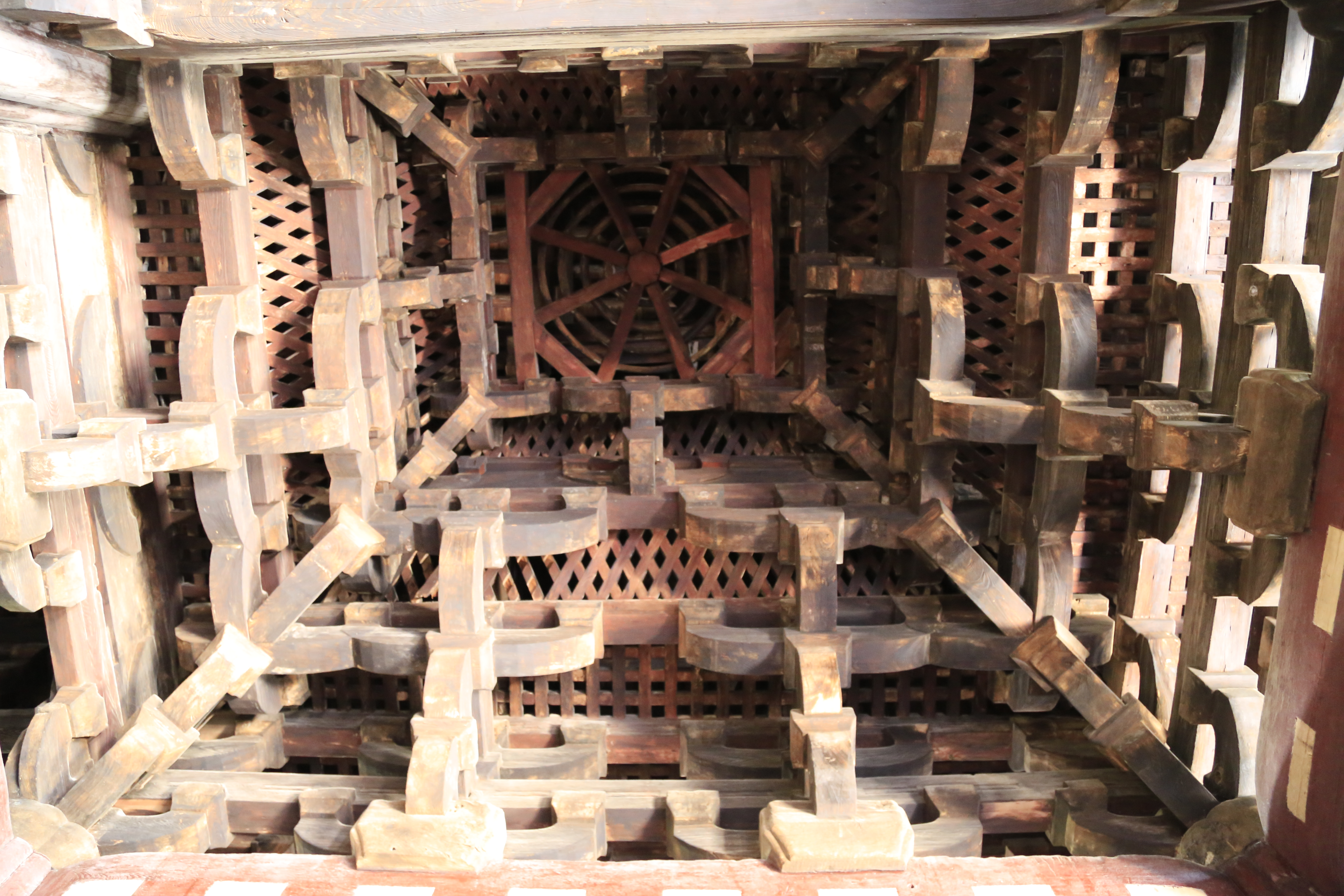

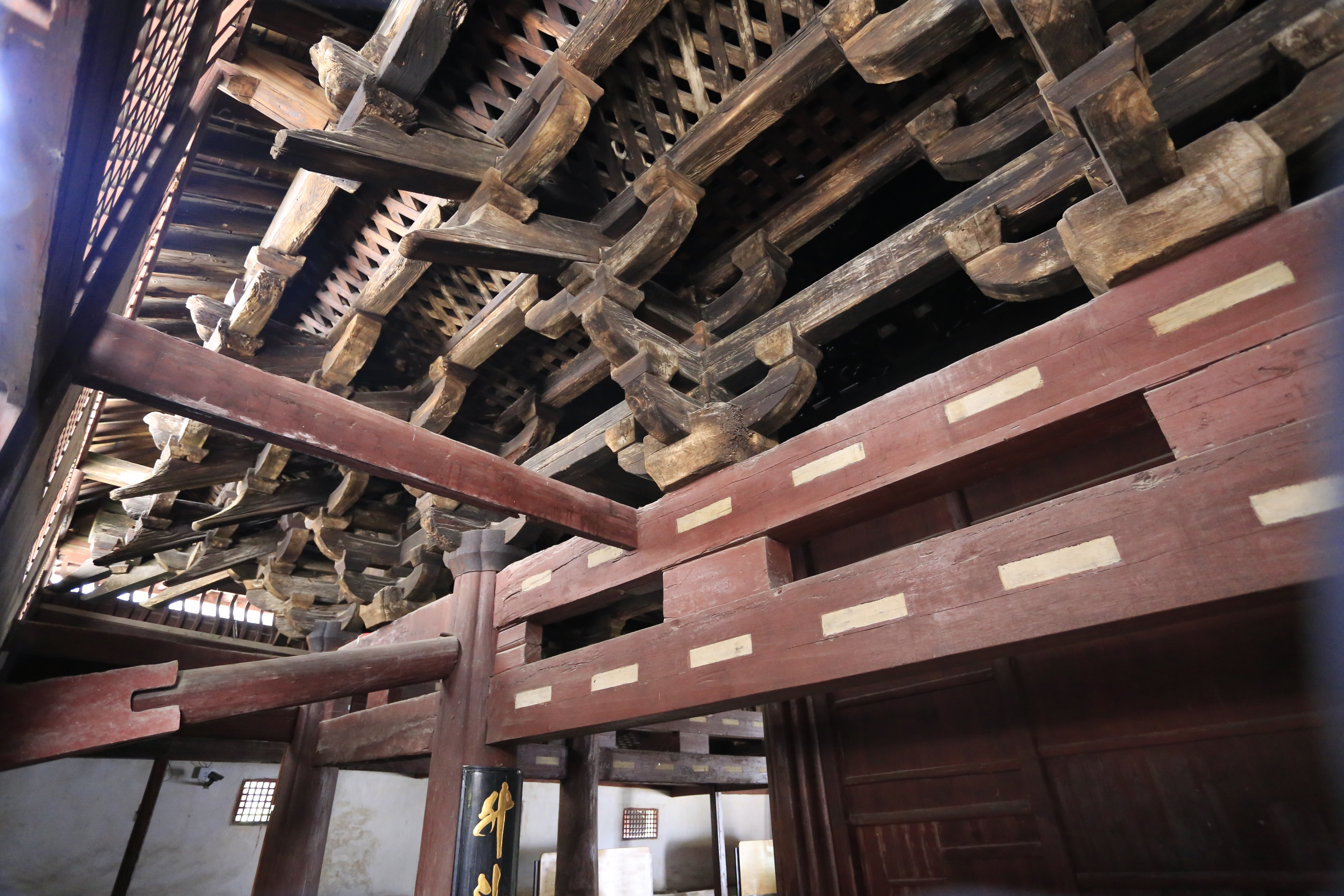

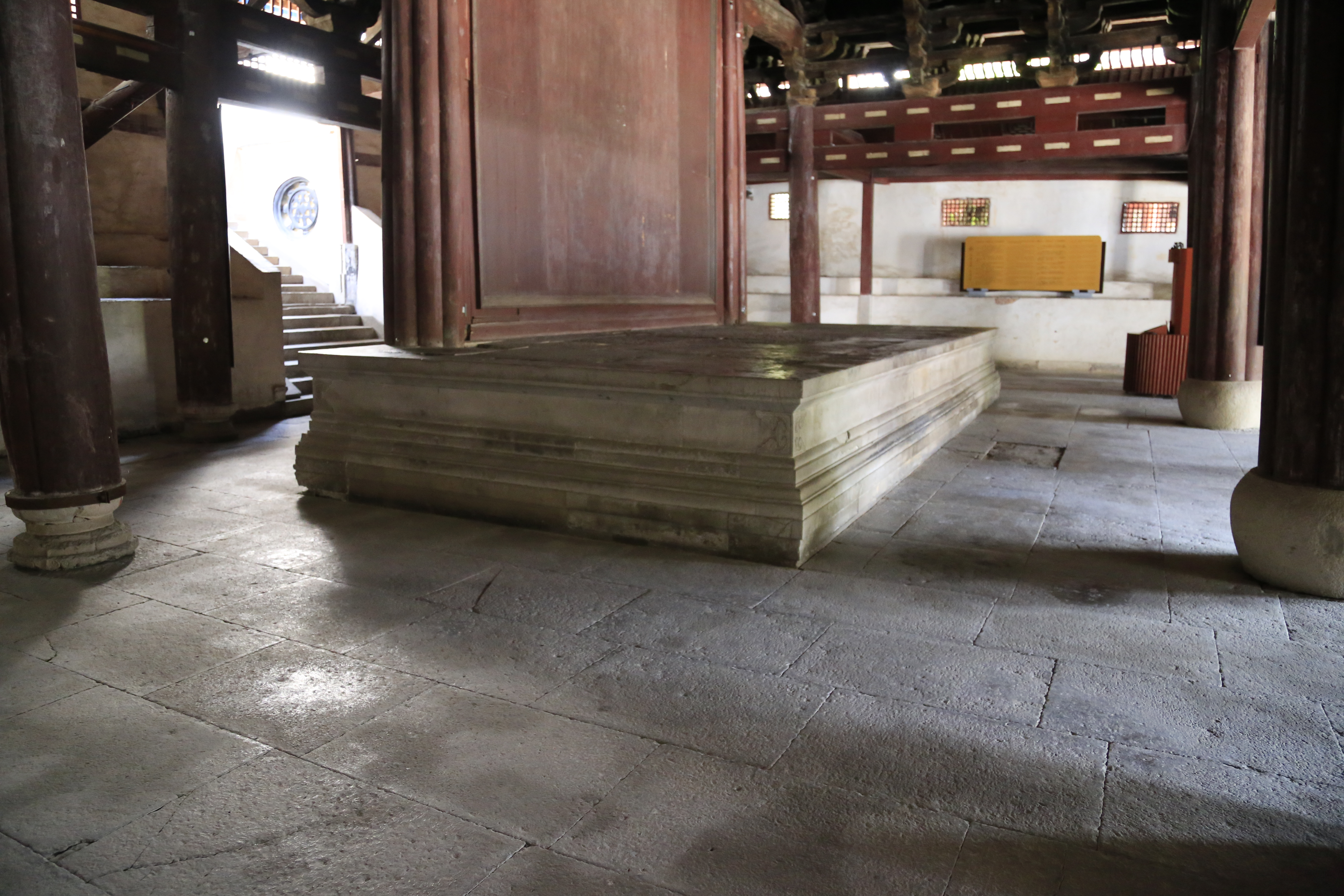

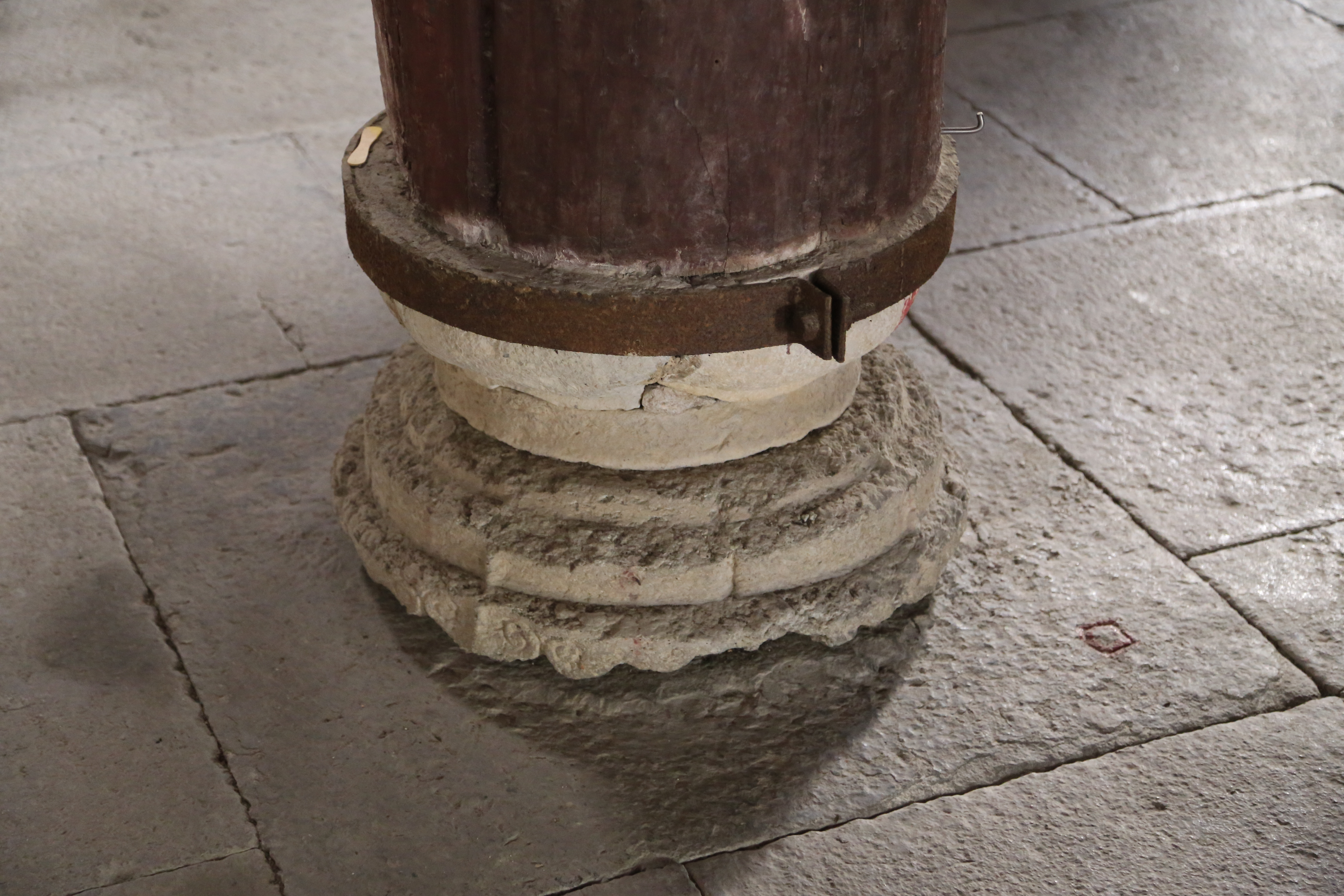

== Transport ==
The temple can be accessed by bus 332 from Ningbo city. The ride takes approximately 35 minutes.

== See also ==
- List of Buddhist temples
- Major National Historical and Cultural Sites (Zhejiang)
