= Ing Chang-ki =

Taiwanese banker and Go player

Personal information
- Native name: Trad. 應昌期 Simp. 应昌期 (Chinese)
- Born: October 23, 1916 Cicheng, Ningbo, Republic of China
- Died: August 27, 1997 (aged 80)

Sport
- Affiliation: Ing Chang-ki Weichi Educational Foundation

Ing Chang-ki (Chinese: 應昌期; pinyin: Yīng Chāngqī; 23 October 1916 – 27 August 1997) was a Chinese industrialist, Go player, and Go promoter. He was the founder of the Ing Cup. He is also known for promoting the Ing rules of Go. He also promoted one of the first digital game clocks to support byoyomi, per-move time control.

== Biography ==
Ing Chang-ki was born in Cixi County (currently Cicheng, Jiangbei District, Ningbo), Zhejiang Province in 1917. As a young man, Ing worked as a clerk in a bank in Shanghai, where he later became a famous local banker. In 1949, he went to Taipei and eventually became an industrial mogul in Taiwan.

Ing created the Ing Chang-ki Weichi Educational Foundation for further promotion of Go, while encouraging the use of the name Goe in an attempt to differentiate its name from the English verb go.

Until 2000, he sponsored a tournament and substantial prize for computer Go programs known as the Ing Prize.

== See also ==
- Chang-ki Cup
- Ing Cup
