= Panhuo Road station =

Metro station in Ningbo, China

Panhuo Road 潘火路
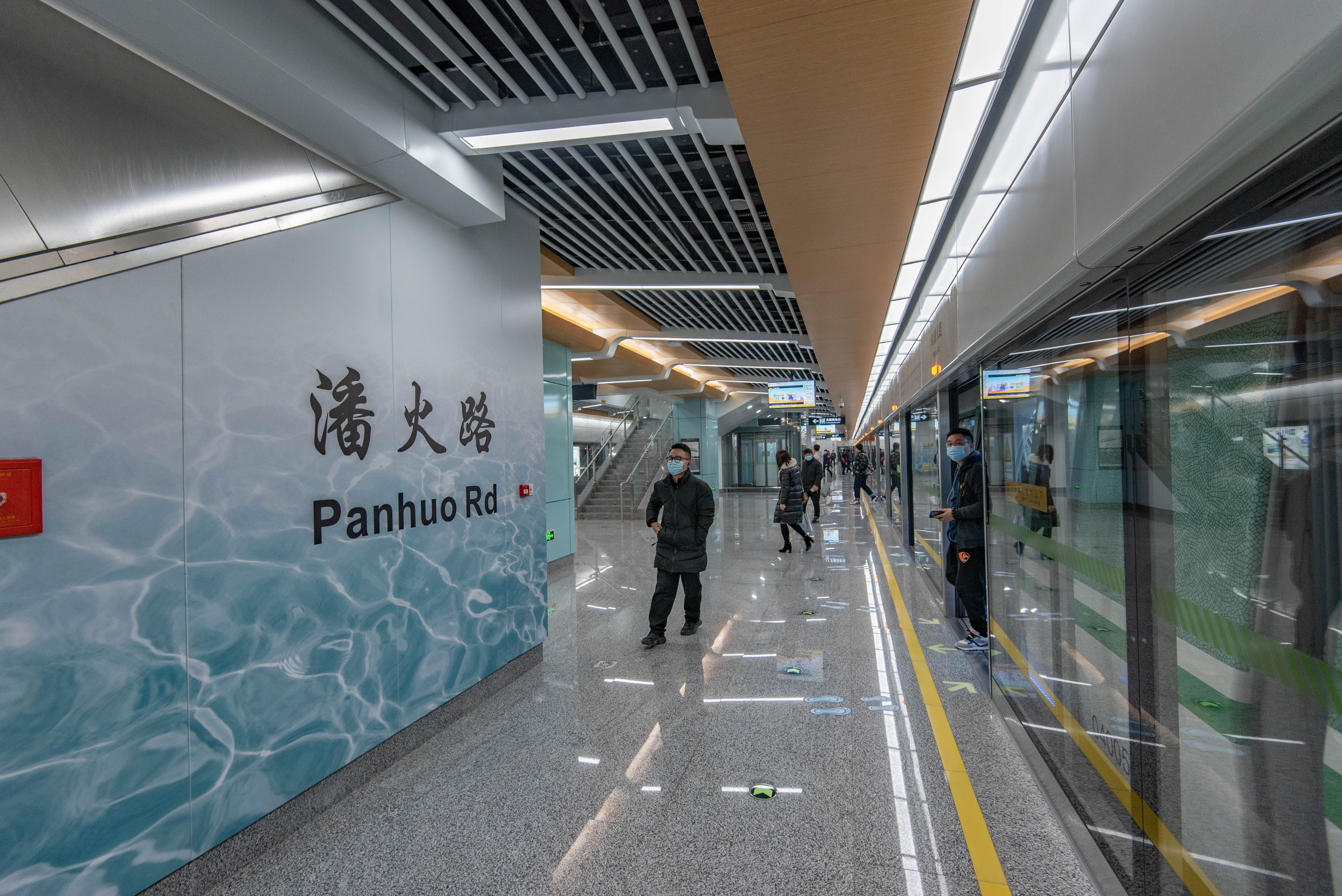
- Platform

General information
- Location: Canghai Road × Panhuo Road/Huancheng South Road; Yinzhou District, Ningbo, Zhejiang; China
- Coordinates: 29°50′34″N 121°35′14″E
- Operator: Ningbo Rail Transit
- Line: Line 4
- Platforms: 2 (1 island platform)

Construction
- Structure type: Underground

Services
Preceding station	Ningbo Rail Transit	Following station
Ailiu towards Cicheng West	Line 4	Songjiang East Road towards International Conference Center
Location

Panhuo Road station, formerly known as Huancheng South Road station during construction, is an underground subway station in Ningbo, Zhejiang, served by Line 4 of Ningbo Rail Transit. Construction of the station began as planned in 2015. The station opened on 23 December 2020.

== Style ==
Panhuo Road Station is located in the crossing between Huancheng South Road and Ningbo-Hengxi Road, Yinzhou District. The station is an underground 2-story island platform station with following characteristics: a length of 192m and a width of 19.7m. The total construction area is 11131 sq meters.

== Exits ==
It has been set four exits.
