= Ing Cup =

International Go competition

- Full name: Ing Cup
- Started: 1988
- Sponsors: Ing Chang-ki Weiqi Educational Foundation
- Prize money: US$400,000

The Ing Cup (Chinese: 应氏杯; pinyin: Yīng Shì Bēi) is an international Go tournament with a cash prize of over US$400,000. It was created by, and is named after, Ing Chang-ki. The tournament is held once every four years and hence often nicknamed the Go Olympics.

In the 7th Ing Cup, held in 2012/13, Fan Tingyu defeated Park Junghwan and became the youngest Ing Cup winner in history. In the semifinal, Fan defeated Xie He, and Park defeated Lee Chang-ho.

== Overview ==
The Ing Cup is sponsored by Ing Chang-ki Weichi Educational Foundation, Yomiuri Shimbun, the Nihon-Kiin, and Kansai-Kiin, and is held every four years (and thus often nicknamed Go Olympics). The competition has its own special rules. There is no byoyomi; instead, players who run out of time pay a two-point penalty to receive some extra time. The precise amount of time has varied historically; in the 10th cup final in 2024, the time allotment was three and a half hours for each player, with a two-point penalty to receive an extra 35 minutes, and players could receive extra time this way at most three times. The komi is 8 points, but Black wins ties. The first rounds are single-elimination knockouts, the semifinals are best-of-three, and the finals are best-of-five (except in 2023, when the final was best-of-three).

== Past winners and runners-up ==
Edition	Year	Winner	Score	Runner-up
1st	1988–1989	(South Korea) Cho Hunhyun	3–2	(China) Nie Weiping
2nd	1992–1993	(South Korea) Seo Bongsoo	3–2	(Japan) Otake Hideo
3rd	1996	(South Korea) Yoo Changhyuk	3–1	(Japan) Yoda Norimoto
4th	2000–2001	(South Korea) Lee Changho	3–1	(China) Chang Hao
5th	2004–2005	(China) Chang Hao	3–1	(South Korea) Choi Cheolhan
6th	2008–2009	(South Korea) Choi Cheolhan	3–1	(South Korea) Lee Changho
7th	2012–2013	(China) Fan Tingyu	3–1	(South Korea) Park Junghwan
8th	2016	(China) Tang Weixing	3–2	(South Korea) Park Junghwan
9th	2020–2023	(South Korea) Shin Jinseo	2–0	(China) Xie Ke
10th	2024	(Japan) Ryo Ichiriki	3–0	(China) Xie Ke

=== By nation ===
Nation	Winners	Runners-up
South Korea	6	4
China	3	4
Japan	1	2

== 8th Ing Cup (2016) ==
First round 20 Apr 2016	Second round 22 Apr	Quarterfinals 24 Apr	Semifinals 10–14 Jun	Final 10–12 Aug, 22–26 Oct
bye	Fan Tingyu	Shi Yue	Shi Yue	Tang Weixing (3–2)
Shi Yue – Yamashita Keigo	Shi Yue	Shi Yue	Shi Yue	Tang Weixing (3–2)
Kono Rin – Chen Yaoye	Kono Rin	Kono Rin	Shi Yue	Tang Weixing (3–2)
Park Yeong-hun – Gu Li	Park Yeong-hun	Kono Rin	Shi Yue	Tang Weixing (3–2)
Hane Naoki – Eric Lui	Hane Naoki	Tang Weixing	Tang Weixing (2–1)	Tang Weixing (3–2)
Tang Weixing – Yuki Satoshi	Tang Weixing	Tang Weixing	Tang Weixing (2–1)	Tang Weixing (3–2)
Mi Yuting – Fan Hui	Mi Yuting	Kim Ji-seok	Tang Weixing (2–1)	Tang Weixing (3–2)
Kim Ji-seok – Lian Xiao	Kim Ji-seok	Kim Ji-seok	Tang Weixing (2–1)	Tang Weixing (3–2)
Kang Dong-yun – Qiu Jun	Kang Dong-yun	Kang Dong-yun	Lee Sedol	Park Junghwan
Won Seong-jin – Tuo Jiaxi	Won Seong-jin	Kang Dong-yun	Lee Sedol	Park Junghwan
Lee Sedol – Andy Liu	Lee Sedol	Lee Sedol	Lee Sedol	Park Junghwan
Lin Lixiang – Na Hyeon	Lin Lixiang	Lee Sedol	Lee Sedol	Park Junghwan
Wang Yuanjun – Mateusz Surma	Wang Yuanjun	Ke Jie	Park Junghwan (2–1)	Park Junghwan
Ke Jie – Cho U	Ke Jie	Ke Jie	Park Junghwan (2–1)	Park Junghwan
Huang Yunsong – So Yokoku	Huang Yunsong	Park Junghwan	Park Junghwan (2–1)	Park Junghwan
bye	Park Junghwan	Park Junghwan	Park Junghwan (2–1)	Park Junghwan

== 9th Ing Cup (2020–2023) ==
The 9th Ing Cup began in 2020, but its conclusion was significantly delayed, because of the COVID-19 pandemic and the organizers' decision to hold the final match face-to-face rather than online. The finalists were Shin Jin-seo and Xie Ke, who each advanced from the semifinals in January 2021. Shin Jin-seo beat Xie Ke 2–0 in the final matches, held on August 21 and 23, 2023.

First round 8 Sep 2020	Second round 9 Sep 2020	Quarterfinals 10 Sep 2020	Semifinals 10 & 12 Jan 2021	Final 21–24 Aug 2023
bye	Tang Weixing	Tao Xinran	Ichiriki Ryo	Xie Ke
Tao Xinran – Lee Dong-hun	Tao Xinran	Tao Xinran	Ichiriki Ryo	Xie Ke
Ichiriki Ryo – Mi Yuting	Ichiriki Ryo	Ichiriki Ryo	Ichiriki Ryo	Xie Ke
An Seong-jun – Li Wei	An Seong-jun	Ichiriki Ryo	Ichiriki Ryo	Xie Ke
Ke Jie – Kim Ji-seok	Ke Jie	Ke Jie	Xie Ke (2–0)	Xie Ke
Jiang Weijie – Murakawa Daisuke	Jiang Weijie	Ke Jie	Xie Ke (2–0)	Xie Ke
Xie Ke – Ali Jabarin	Xie Ke	Xie Ke	Xie Ke (2–0)	Xie Ke
Yang Dingxin – Shibano Toramaru	Yang Dingxin	Xie Ke	Xie Ke (2–0)	Xie Ke
Shin Jinseo – Xie Erhao	Shin Jinseo	Shin Jinseo	Shin Jinseo (2–0)	Shin Jinseo (2–0)
Fan Tingyu – Shin Min-jun	Fan Tingyu	Shin Jinseo	Shin Jinseo (2–0)	Shin Jinseo (2–0)
Kono Rin – Lin Lixiang	Kono Rin	Gu Zihao	Shin Jinseo (2–0)	Shin Jinseo (2–0)
Gu Zihao – Iyama Yuta	Gu Zihao	Gu Zihao	Shin Jinseo (2–0)	Shin Jinseo (2–0)
Xu Haohong – Byun Sang-il	Xu Haohong	Xu Haohong	Zhao Chenyu	Shin Jinseo (2–0)
Hsu Chia-yuan – Dang Yifei	Hsu Chia-yuan	Xu Haohong	Zhao Chenyu	Shin Jinseo (2–0)
Zhao Chenyu – Ryan Li	Zhao Chenyu	Zhao Chenyu	Zhao Chenyu	Shin Jinseo (2–0)
bye	Park Junghwan	Zhao Chenyu	Zhao Chenyu	Shin Jinseo (2–0)

== 10th Ing Cup (2024) ==
The 10th Ing Cup expanded the number of players from 30 to 58. The finalists of the previous tournament, Shin Jinseo and Xie Ke, automatically qualified for the round of 16. The first and second round were played online on April 20–21, 2024. The round of 16, round of 8, and semifinals were played July 3–9. Match-ups were not determined by a pre-set bracket, but randomly drawn each round. Time controls in games before the semifinals were 2 hours per player, and players could pay a penalty to receive an extra 20 minutes up to three times. Games in the semifinals were played with 2.5 hours and up to three 25-minute extra periods; games in the finals were played with 3.5 hours and up to three 35-minute extra periods.

Round of 16 (July 3):

- (Japan) Ichiriki Ryo defeated (China) Liu Yuhang
- (China) Li Qincheng def. (China) Liao Yuanhe
- (China) Xie Ke def. (South Korea) Kim Jin-hwi
- (China) Xu Jiayang def. (South Korea) Park Junghwan
- (Chinese Taipei) Xu Haohong def. (China) Peng Liyao
- (China) Wang Xinghao def. (South Korea) Shin Jinseo
- (South Korea) Won Seong-jin def. (China) Li Xuanhao
- (China) Ke Jie def. (South Korea) Shin Min-jun

Round of 8 (July 4):

- (Japan) Ichiriki Ryo defeated (China) Xu Jiayang
- (China) Ke Jie def. (China) Wang Xinghao
- (China) Xie Ke def. (South Korea) Won Seong-jin
- (Chinese Taipei) Xu Haohong def. (China) Li Qincheng

Semifinals (July 6, 8, 9):

- (Japan) Ichiriki Ryo 2–1 (China) Ke Jie
- (China) Xie Ke 2–0 (Chinese Taipei) Xu Haohong

Final (August 12, 14, and September 8):

- (Japan) Ichiriki Ryo 3–0 (China) Xie Ke
