= Cicheng =

Town in Ningbo, Zhejiang, China

Coordinates: 29°58′49″N 121°26′43″E

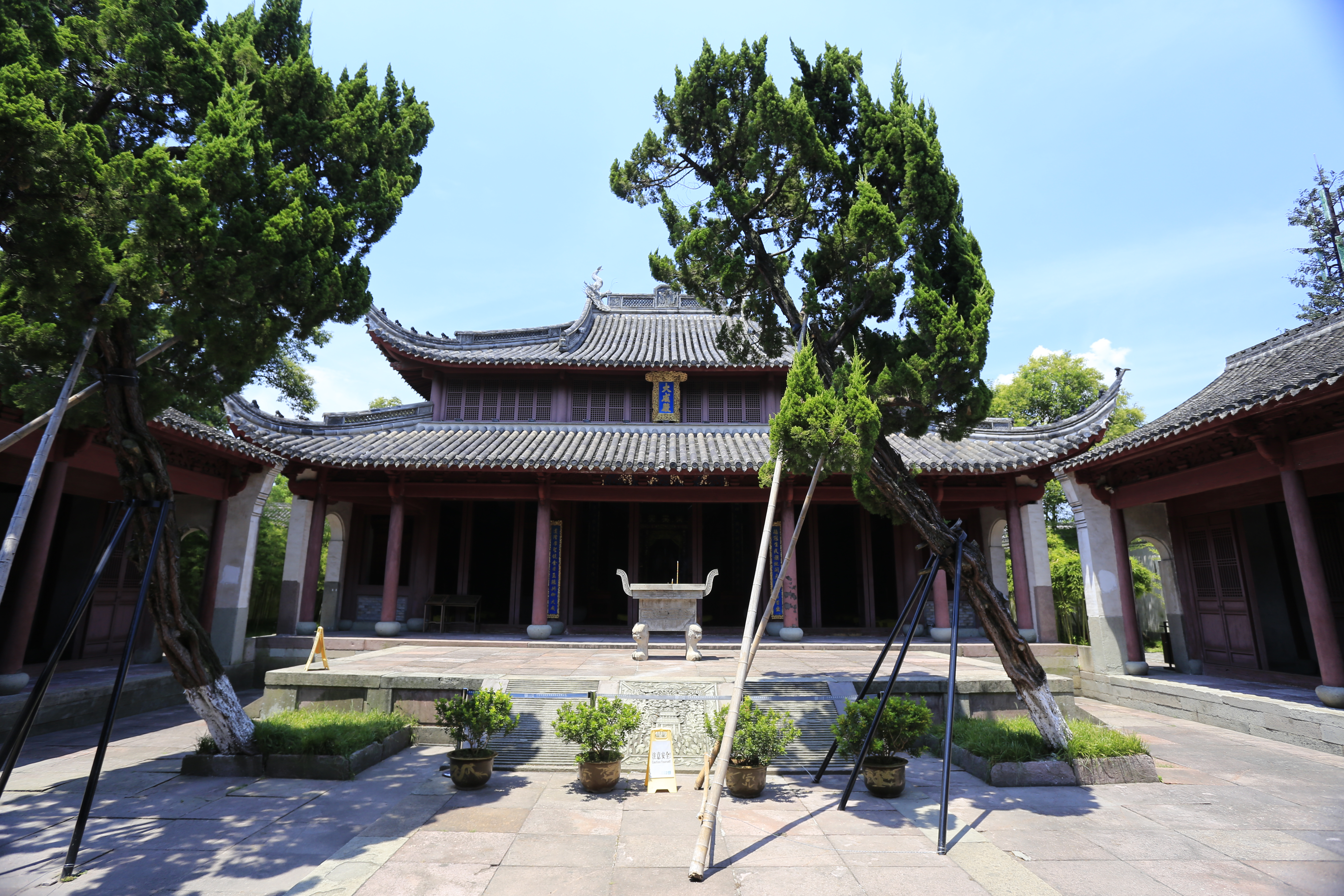
Confucian Temple of Cicheng

Cicheng (Chinese: 慈城; pinyin: Cíchéng) is a town in the Jiangbei District of Ningbo in Zhejiang. It is an ancient walled city dating from the 8th century when it was renowned for its handicrafts. As of 2012 the town and its ancient traditions were being revived by the government of Ningbo through the Cicheng Development Company and the Cicheng Innovation Cultural Park where demonstrations of traditional handicrafts by skilled craftsmen are presented. Traditional craftsmen are encouraged to settle in the town and establish workshops.
