= Jiangbei, Ningbo =

Jiangbei 江北区
- District
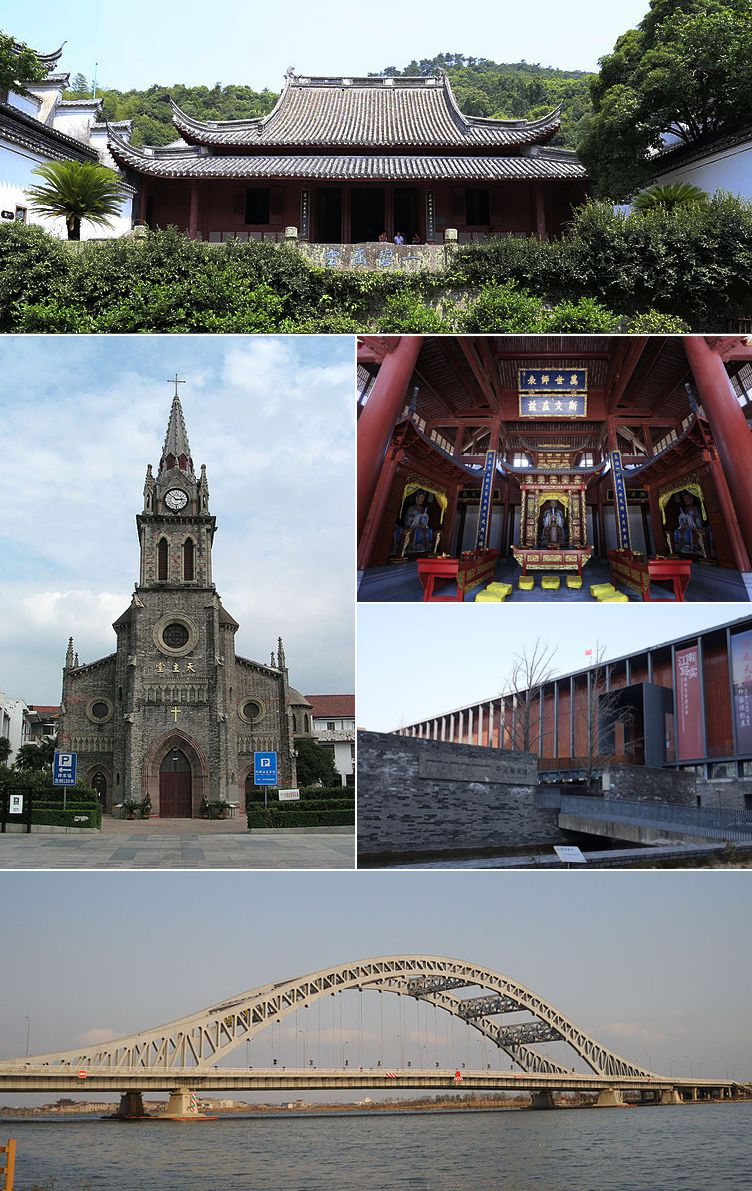
- Clockwise from the top: Baoguo Temple, Cicheng Confucious Temple, Ningbo Museum of Art, Wantou Bridge, Jiangbei Cathedral

- Jiangbei District in Ningbo City

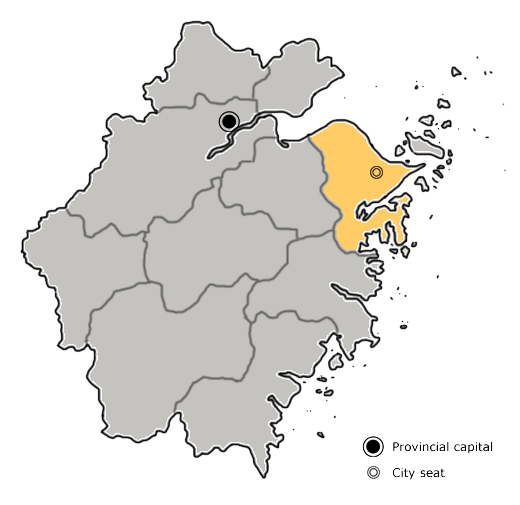
- Ningbo in Zhejiang
- Coordinates: 29°53′33″N 121°33′39″E
- Country: People's Republic of China
- Province: Zhejiang
- Sub-provincial city: Ningbo

Area
  - Total: 209 km^{2} (81 sq mi)

Population (2002)
  - Total: 230,000
  - Density: 1,100/km^{2} (2,900/sq mi)
- Time zone: UTC+8 (China Standard)
- Postal code: 315020
- Area code: 0574
- Website: http://www.nbjiangbei.gov.cn/

Jiangbei District (Chinese: 江北区; pinyin: Jiāngběi Qū) is a county-level district under the jurisdiction of Ningbo city in Zhejiang Province of the People's Republic of China. The district's total area is 209 square kilometers, which makes it the largest subdivision in the traditional urban area of Ningbo (namely Haishu, Jiangdong, and Jiangbei). Jiangbei District is famous for its historical sites such as the Old Bund, which oversaw the history of international trade of Ningbo, and Cicheng Town, an ancient town with a history more than 1000 years.

== Geography ==
Jiangbei District lies in the middle of Ningbo Municipality, in south of Cixi city, east of Yuyao city and west of Zhenhai District. The Yong River separates Jiangbei from Haishu District and Yinzhou District. The district is 27 kilometers long from west to east, and 20 kilometers from north to south. Plains make up most of the lands in Jiangbei District, while in the north of the district, there are hills. Many rivers run through Jiangbei and empty into the Yong River. The district is rich in water resources.

== History ==
Jiangbei District was founded in May 1951 after the foundation of People's Republic of China. However, the history of Jiangbei can be tracked back to Gouzhang(句章) City, which was built by Goujian, the king of the State of Yue. In the year 621, Gouzhang was separated into Yaozhou and Yinzhou. In the year 738, the land that now belongs to Jiangbei was in the area of Mao(鄮) County. In the year 738, Mingzhou was established and Mao County was separated into Cixi, Fenghua, Mao, and Wengshan. The western part of what was Jiangbei now belongs to Cixi County, and the eastern part belongs to Mao (and later Yin) County. In 809, Yin County was also separated into Wanghai County (currently Zhenhai District). From then on until 1951 the land that now belongs to Jiangbei was in the area of three different counties: Cixi, Yin, and Zhenhai.

After the foundation of the PRC, Jiangbei District was founded as well as another new district called Jiao District. In 1984, these two districts were merged into Jiangbei District.

== Administrative regions ==
The district administers seven street offices and one town.

Street offices: Zhongma Street, Baisha Street, Kongpu Street, Wenjiao Street, Yongjiang Street, Zhuangqiao Street, and Hongtang Street.

Town: Cicheng.

== Economy ==
Jiangbei Industrial Zone is an important area of manufacture in Ningbo. Plastic mechanics, dies, and automobile parts are products in massive manufacture in Jiangbei. The district is also featured by its non-ferrous metal industry and shipping.

== Culture and tourism ==
Jiangbei District is rich in history and culture. Cicheng Town was famous for its long history. It was the political center of Cixi County from the Tang dynasty until the foundation of the PRC, hence many historic buildings were kept as they were.

The Old Bund beside Yong River was constructed in 1844, earlier than the famous Shanghai Bund. It oversaw the history when Ningbo opened to foreign trade in 1844 and was characterized by European-styled offices, cathedrals and streets.

Built during the Northern Song dynasty, Baoguo Temple is the second oldest Buddhist temple in south China.

== Education ==
- Ningbo University
- Ningbo University of Technology

== Famous people ==
- Tan Jiazhen
- Feng Jicai
- Ing Chang-ki
- Zhou Xinfang
