= 8th LG Cup =

The 8th LG Cup featured:

- 12 players from South Korea - An Choyoung, An Young-gil, Cho Hanseung, Cho Hunhyun, Hong Jang-sik, Kim Joo-ho, Lee Chang-ho, Lee Sedol, Mok Jin-seok, Won Seong-jin, Yoo Changhyuk
- 5 players from Japan - Cho Chikun, Hane Naoki, O Meien, O Rissei, Ryu Shikun
- 4 players from China - Chang Hao, Wang Lei, Yu Bin, Zhou Heyang
- 1 player from Taiwan - Zhou Junxun
- 1 player from (United States) North America - Michael Redmond
- 1 player from Europe - Alexandre Dinerchtein

Out of the 24 players that participated, the holder of the 7th LG Cup, Lee Sedol, and runner-up Lee Chang-ho were given automatic berths.

Round of 16
(China) Yu Bin | 0
(South Korea) Lee Sedol | 1
(Europe) Alexander Dinerchtein | 0
(South Korea) Cho Hanseung | 0
(Japan) Cho Chikun | 0
(South Korea) Lee Chang-ho | 1
(South Korea) Kim Joo-ho | 1
(China) Zhou Heyang | 0
(China) Wang Lei | 1
(South Korea) Song Tae Kon | 0
(South Korea) Mok Jin-seok | 1
(South Korea) Cho Hunhyun | 0
(South Korea) Won Seong-jin | 1
(United States) Michael Redmond | 0
(South Korea) Yoo Changhyuk | 0
(China) Chang Hao | 1

Quarter-finals
Lee Sedol | 0
Cho Hanseung | 1
Lee Chang-ho | 1
Kim Joo-ho | 0
Wang Lei | 0
Mok Jin-seok | 1
Won Seong-jin | 1
Chang Hao | 0

Semi-finals
Cho Hanseung | 0
Lee Chang-ho | 1
Mok Jin-seok | 1
Won Seong-jin | 0

Final
Lee Chang-ho | 3
Mok Jin-seok | 1

== Final ==
| Player | 1 | 2 | 3 | 4 | 5 | T |
|---|---|---|---|---|---|---|
| (South Korea) Lee Chang-ho | Loss | Won | Won | Won | N.P. | 3 |
| (South Korea) Mok Jin-seok | Won | Loss | Loss | Loss | N.P. | 1 |
