= 29th LG Cup World Baduk Championship final controversy =

The 29th LG Cup World Baduk Championship, held from 2024 to 2025, was marked by several interruptions during the final three-game match due to the implementation of new Korean Go rules. Ke Jie chose to withdraw from the final game to protest the timing of the referee's intervention. The organizers subsequently announced that Byun Sang-il had defeated Ke Jie 2–1 to win the championship, sparking widespread controversy. The Chinese Weiqi Association issued a statement after the match, stating that it did not recognize the result of the third game of the final.

== Background ==
In South Korea and Japan, Go rules use the territory counting method to determine the winner. At the end of the game, captured stones are placed on the board's empty spaces for counting. Players often use these captured stones to assess the game's situation during play. In contrast, Chinese rules employ the area scoring method, where captured stones do not affect the outcome. Historically, there have been instances where Chinese players mistakenly placed captured stones into their opponent's Go bowl during matches against Japanese players. Disputes over the number of dead stones also arose during the 2004 and 2010 Samsung Cup qualifiers between Chinese and Korean players.

In November 2024, the Korean Baduk Association revised its rules, requiring that captured stones be placed on the lid of the Go bowl. A first violation results in a 2-point penalty, while a second violation leads to an automatic loss. These rules were communicated to the Chinese side before the Samsung Cup in November 2024.

One of the major controversies of the 29th LG Cup was the retroactive application of the new rules, which were implemented in November 2024, even though the tournament began in May 2024. According to sports event conventions, rules should not apply retroactively to events that started before their implementation. The penalties imposed during the final were deemed unreasonable by many.

== Incident ==
The final of the 29th LG Cup World Go Championship featured China's Ke Jie, 9-dan, against South Korea's Byun Sang-il, 9-dan. Based on their past match records, Ke Jie held an absolute advantage. In the first game, Ke Jie, playing black, won by 2.5 points. However, during the second game, at the 44th move, the referee ruled that Ke Jie had failed to place a captured stone on the lid of the Go bowl during the 18th move and penalized him by deducting 2 points. The Chinese side immediately raised an objection, arguing that the rules did not specify the timing for placing the stones and that the penalty was too severe, but the Korean side did not agree. At the 80th move, Ke Jie again failed to place a captured stone on the lid of the Go bowl. While Ke Jie was pouring water after making the 82nd move, Byun Sang-il raised a complaint with the referee. Although Ke Jie quickly corrected the mistake, the referee still ruled it a foul, resulting in an automatic loss for Ke Jie. The Chinese side subsequently appealed but was unable to change the outcome. This marked the first time in a Go World Championship final that a game was terminated due to a foul.

In the third game, Byun Sang-il took a clear advantage from the opening. At the 159th move, Ke Jie was warned again for a stone-capturing violation, leading to a two-hour suspension of the game. At this critical moment, Ke Jie had 1 hour and 32 minutes remaining, while Byun Sang-il had 43 minutes. Byun Sang-il was deep in thought, as an inappropriate move could result in the loss of a major group (referred to as the "big dragon"). Ke Jie argued that the referee's decision to pause the game during Byun Sang-il's turn unfairly extended his opponent's thinking time. He requested that the game resume and be paused only after Byun Sang-il made his move, but the referee, Sun Genqi, rejected the suggestion. At this point, Ke Jie signaled to the referee that he did not object to the penalty but asked for the game to resume immediately and be paused after Byun Sang-il's move. However, the referee insisted on maintaining the break. During the match, the referee repeatedly intervened to pause the game during Ke Jie's opponent's turn. Ke Jie expressed frustration, saying, "It's like this every time." He believed the referee's actions had compromised the match's integrity and decided he could not continue. The Korean side argued that Ke Jie had violated the rules by lifting stones twice during moves 155 and 157 but chose to penalize him only once, deducting 2 points and allowing the game to continue. The Chinese side contended that the referee's timing for the suspension was inappropriate and requested a replay, but Byun Sang-il disagreed. The two sides failed to reach an agreement. Ultimately, Ke Jie withdrew from the competition. The organizers declared Byun Sang-il the winner, making him the champion of the LG Cup. This was also the first time in a Go World Championship final that a player was declared the loser due to a withdrawal.

Subsequently, some Go enthusiasts discovered that during the 262nd move of the first game of the final, Byun Sang-il's sleeve accidentally moved another stone, and he reset the stone without consulting the referee. Neither Ke Jie nor the referee commented on this during the game. Additionally, in the second and final rounds, Byun Sang-il engaged in behaviors that may have violated the new rules. For example, during the 52nd move of the final round, Byun Sang-il pressed the Go clock first and then placed the stone on the lid of the Go bowl. Combined with the referee's retroactive penalties for Ke Jie's violations in the second and third games, this "double standard" behavior led some Go fans to question the fairness of the tournament organizers.

The organizers announced that Byun Sang-il had defeated Ke Jie 2–1 to win the LG Cup championship, with two of the wins resulting from Ke Jie's rule violations and subsequent withdrawal. This made Byun Sang-il the first Go world champion in history to win without defeating his opponent on the board, relying solely on the referee's decisions. In fact, this was the first Go game in history to be won with a score of 0–1.

== Responses ==
During the competition, the Korean side was accused of making multiple controversial decisions based on unclear and unreasonable rules. Their selective enforcement of the rules and perceived double standards caused dissatisfaction among players and Go enthusiasts.

Chinese Go player Ding Hao, 9-dan, remarked that the incident signaled a departure from Go's noble cultural attributes, reducing it to a purely competitive sport and deviating from its original intent as a "gentleman's game." Nie Weiping, honorary chairman of the Chinese Go Association, commented, "The LG Cup final was a tragedy for the Go community. This has not happened in so many years. I sympathize with Ke Jie. The Korean side should have done better! Ke Jie's withdrawal was quite dramatic. It takes immense effort to progress from the qualifiers to the finals, and the Korean side did not respect the players' hard work. Chairman Chen Yi once said that although Go is a minor sport, morality is the most respected. Go should remain a gentlemanly sport." Chinese player Lian Xiao, 9-dan, expressed strong sympathy for Ke Jie and criticized Byun Sang-il's reporting behavior during the second game, calling it "deeply shocking" and damaging to the image of Go's predecessors. Tang Weixing, another Chinese player, strongly criticized the referee's double standards. Female Go player Zhan Ying, 2-dan, commented, "This should have been a world-class Go competition, but it ended like this. He won the world championship without winning a single game. This is unprecedented in history." Ni Zhanggen, chairman of Menglily Home Furnishing and sponsor of the Menglily Cup, posted a video on his personal Bilibili account, stating that in this tournament, "the referee eventually became the protagonist," calling it "a sadness for Go and a big joke." He also hinted at banning Byun Sang-il from participating in the sixth Menglily Cup World Go Open.

During the game, staff from the Chinese Weiqi Association made subjective remarks during the live broadcast, such as, "Rules are rules; they were not set today." They also refrained from criticizing the South Korean side in their January 22 statement, leading to widespread criticism of the association. On January 23, the Chinese Go Association issued a statement on its official WeChat account, declaring that it did not accept the result of the third game due to the referee's inappropriate timing in interrupting the match, which excessively disturbed the players and prevented them from completing the game.

At the award ceremony, Byun Sang-il stated that he fully understood Ke Jie's position and expressed regret over the match's unfortunate conclusion. In a later interview, he admitted that his concentration was disrupted when the referee pointed out Ke Jie's failure to place a dead stone on the lid of the Go bowl. He also stated that he was unaware of the rule until the referee announced Ke Jie's foul and believed the rule was unnecessary, as it had no bearing on the game's outcome. In response, Tang Weixing sarcastically remarked, "Even if you feel uncomfortable, it won't stop you from raising your hand to report it. The child can achieve great things."

== Ke Jie's Response ==
On the evening of January 23, after the competition ended, Ke Jie changed his Sina Weibo profile to "World Go Nine-time Champion."

In his first live broadcast after the game on January 26, Ke Jie emotionally recounted the match, describing the mental trauma it caused him. He revealed that since January 22, he had been unable to eat or sleep properly and could hardly believe what had happened. He said, "The first image that came to my mind was that after my opponent reported me, while Coach Yu Bin and I were protesting, my opponent was chatting and laughing with others at the scene." At this point, Ke Jie nearly choked up and could not continue, saying, "We were still protesting... At that moment, I heard the sound of breaking. I don't know if it was my heart that was broken or Go itself."

Ke Jie also recalled the first time he was penalized two points. He stated that he had read the rules, which only required stones to be placed inside the lid of the Go bowl but did not specify when they should be placed. At the time, the referee said, "The right of interpretation belongs to me. I am the referee, and I have the final say." Ke Jie added, "The referee told Coach Yu, 'If you continue to waste time, I will now judge you as the loser.' But he intervened three times during my opponent's thinking time. Why did he say we were wasting time? Why did he use such insulting words to discriminate against us?"

Ke Jie concluded by bowing deeply toward the camera, saying, "You gave me the courage to know that I had not lost, that in fact, he had not won a single game."

== Subsequent Impact ==
After learning about the incident, Ni Zhanggen, chairman of the Menglily Group, stated that Byun Sang-il would be banned from participating in the MLily Cup.

On January 25, Beijing time, the Chinese Go Association issued a notice to all league teams. To cultivate reserve forces, foreign players would be prohibited from participating in Chinese Go leagues and championships at all levels, including the Men's and Women's Leagues, for the season. If implemented, this regulation would primarily affect Korean Go players, significantly impacting their income. In the previous year, Byun Sang-il had played the most games in the Chinese Weiqi League among foreign players.
