= 7th LG Cup =

The 7th LG Cup featured:

- 12 players from South Korea - An Dal-Hoon, Cho Hanseung, Cho Hunhyun, Kim Sungjun, Lee Chang-ho, Lee Sang-Hoon, Lee Sedol, Park Young-Hoon, Won Seong-jin, Yoo Changhyuk, Yun Junsang, Zhujiu Jiang
- 5 players from Japan - Cho Chikun, Hane Naoki, Kobayashi Koichi, O Meien, O Rissei
- 4 players from China - Chang Hao, Ma Xiaochun, Yu Bin, Zhou Heyang
- 1 player from Taiwan - Zhou Junxun
- 1 player from (United States) North America - Mingjiu Jiang
- 1 player from Europe - Cătălin Țăranu

== Tournament ==
Round of 16
(South Korea) Yoo Changhyuk	1
(China) Yu Bin	0
(South Korea) Lee Chang-ho	1
(United States) Zhujiu Jiang	0
(South Korea) Park Young-Hoon	1
(China) Ma Xiaochun	0
(South Korea) Lee Sang-Hoon	0
(South Korea) Lee Sedol	1
(China) Zhou Heyang	1
(South Korea) Yun Junsang	0
(South Korea) Won Seong-jin	1
(China) Chang Hao	0
(Japan) Cho Chikun	0
(South Korea) Cho Hunhyun	1
(Japan) O Rissei	0
(South Korea) Cho Hanseung	1

Quarter-finals
Yoo Changhyuk	0
Lee Chang-ho	1
Park Young-Hoon	0
Lee Sedol	1
Zhou Heyang	0
Won Seong-jin	1
Cho Hunhyun	0
Cho Hanseung	1

Semi-finals
Lee Chang-ho	1
Won Seong-jin	0
Lee Sedol	1
Cho Hanseung	0

Final
Lee Sedol	3
Lee Chang-ho	1

== Final ==
Player	1	2	3	4	5	T
(South Korea) Lee Sedol	Won	Loss	Won	Won	N.P.	3
(South Korea) Lee Chang-ho	Loss	Won	Loss	Loss	N.P.	1
