= Japan at the 2010 Asian Games (A–B) =

- IOC code: JPN
- NOC: Japanese Olympic Committee

in Guangzhou
- Competitors: 729 in 42 sports
- Medals Ranked 3rd: Gold 48 Silver 74 Bronze 94 Total 216

Asian Games appearances (overview)
- 1951; 1954; 1958; 1962; 1966; 1970; 1974; 1978; 1982; 1986; 1990; 1994; 1998; 2002; 2006; 2010; 2014; 2018; 2022; 2026

Japan participated in the 2010 Asian Games in Guangzhou, China on 12–27 November 2010.

== Archery ==
=== Men ===
Athlete	Event	Ranking Round		Round of 64	Round of 32	Round of 16	Quarterfinals	Semifinals	Final
Athlete	Event	Score	Seed	Opposition Score	Opposition Score	Opposition Score	Opposition Score	Opposition Score	Opposition Score
Takaharu Furukawa	Individual	1348	6th Q	BYE	Delfin Adriano (PHI); W 4-2 (56-51, 52-53, 56-51)	Keivan Riazimehr (IRI); W 7-3 (27-27, 27-26, 28-26, 26-27, 28-24)	Xing Yu (CHN); L 2-6 (29-27, 26-28, 27-29, 26-30)	did not advance	
Ryota Amano	Individual	1331	11th Q	BYE	Emdadul Haque Milon (BAN); W 4-0 (56-55, 58-55)	Kuo Cheng-wei (TPE); W 6-2 (28-28, 27-27, 29-27, 29-26)	Kim Woo-Jin (KOR); L 0-6 (29-30, 28-29, 26-30)	did not advance	
Hideki Kikuchi	Individual	1324	18th	did not advance					
Masashi Miyahara	Individual	1270	40th	did not advance					
Ryota Amano; Hideki Kikuchi; Takaharu Furukawa	Team	4003	3rd Q			Vietnam (VIE); W 226-199	Chinese Taipei (TPE); L 218-222	did not advance	

=== Women ===
Athlete	Event	Ranking Round		Round of 32	Round of 16	Quarterfinals	Semifinals	Final
Athlete	Event	Score	Seed	Opposition Score	Opposition Score	Opposition Score	Opposition Score	Opposition Score
Sayami Matsushita	Individual	1309	15th Q	Zuhro Tagoeva (TJK); W 4-2 (51-52, 51-49, 51-43)	Le Chien-ying (TPE); W 7-1 (28-24, 28-28, 29-28, 27-26)	Kwon Un-Sil (PRK); L 2-6 (27-28, 25-24, 25-26, 24-29)	did not advance	
Ayaka Saito	Individual	1299	17th Q	Erwina Safitri (INA); L 0-4 (47-51, 50-52)	did not advance			
Yuki Hayashi	Individual	1290	22nd	did not advance				
Kaori Kawanaka	Individual	1258	33rd	did not advance				
Yuki Hayashi; Kaori Kawanaka; Sayami Matsushita	Team	3857	7th Q		Iran (IRI); W 219-193	Chinese Taipei (TPE); L 205-207	did not advance	

== Athletics ==
=== Men ===
Track events

Event	Athletes	Heat Round 1		Semifinal		Final	
Event	Athletes	Result	Rank	Result	Rank	Result	Rank
100 m	Masashi Eriguchi	10.57	2nd QS	10.56	3rd	did not advance	
100 m	Naoki Tsukahara	DNS		did not advance			
200 m	Mitsuhiro Abiko	21.28	4th			did not advance	
200 m	Kenji Fujimitsu	20.80	2nd QF			20.74	2nd place, silver medalist(s)
400 m	Yusuke Ishitsuka	46.66	3rd QF			47.49	8th
400 m	Yuzo Kanemaru	46.33	1st QF			45.32 SB	2nd place, silver medalist(s)
800 m	Masato Yokota	1:49.26	2nd QF			1:46.48	4th
1500 m	Yasunori Murakami	3:46.72	5th QF			3:46.14	9th
5000 m	Kensuke Takezawa					13:54.11	6th
5000 m	Yuki Matsuoka					14:03.62	9th
10000 m	Satoru Kitamura					28:54.71	6th
110 m hurdles	Yuto Aoki	14.01	3rd QF			14.03	7th
110 m hurdles	Tasuku Tanonaka	13.90	4th QF			13.81	5th
400 m hurdles	Naohiro Kawakita	51.01	1st QF			50.37	3rd place, bronze medalist(s)
400 m hurdles	Kenji Narisako	50.15	1st QF			DSQ	
3000 m steeplechase	Tsuyoshi Takeda					8:41.26 SB	5th
4x100 m relay	Masashi Eriguchi; Shinji Takahira; Mitsuhiro Abiko; Kenji Fijimitsu	47.14	5th			did not advance	
4x400 m relay	Yusuke Ishitsuka; Kenji Fujimitsu; Hideyuki Hirose; Yuzo Kanemaru; Naohiro Kawakita*	3:06.53	1st QF			3:02.43 SB	2nd place, silver medalist(s)

* Participated in the heats only.

Field events

Event	Athletes	Qualification		Final	
Event	Athletes	Result	Rank	Result	Rank
High jump	Hiromi Takahari	2.15 m.	5th QF	2.23 m. PB	2nd place, silver medalist(s)
Long jump	Yohei Sugai			7.63 m.	4th
Pole vault	Takafumi Suzuki			5.20 m.	5th
Discus throw	Shigeo Hatakeyama			56.89 m.	5th
Javelin throw	Yukifumi Murakami			83.15 m. PB	1st place, gold medalist(s)
Hammer throw	Hiroaki Doi			68.72 m.	3rd place, bronze medalist(s)

Road events

Event	Athletes		
Event	Athletes	Final	
Event	Athletes	Result	Rank
20 km walk	Isamu Fujisawa	1:24:00	4th
20 km walk	Yusuke Suzuki	1:25:50	5th
50 km walk	Koichiro Morioka	3:47:41 PB	3rd place, bronze medalist(s)
Marathon	Yukihiro Kitaoka	2:12:46	2nd place, silver medalist(s)
Marathon	Tomoyuki Sato	2:18:24	7th

Combined events

Decathlon
Event	Keisuke Ushiro		
Event	Results	Points	Rank
100 m	11.37	780	10th
Long jump	6.74 m.	753	9th
Shot put	13.93 m.	724	5th
High jump	1.94 m.	749	5th
400 m	51.14	763	7th
110 m hurdles	15.39	803	7th
Discus throw	43.44 m.	735	3rd
Pole vault	4.70 m.	819	4th
Javelin throw	68.57 m.	868	1st
1500 m	4:35.66	708	3rd
Final Total		7702	4th

=== Women ===
Track events

Event	Athletes	Heat Round 1		Semifinal		Final	
Event	Athletes	Result	Rank	Result	Rank	Result	Rank
100 m	Chisato Fukushima	11.41	1st QS	11.32	1st QF	11.33	1st place, gold medalist(s)
100 m	Momoko Takahashi	11.78	2nd QS	11.59	2nd QF	11.50	4th
200 m	Chisato Fukushima	23.75	1st QF			23.62	1st place, gold medalist(s)
200 m	Momoko Takahashi	24.13	2nd QF			23.97	6th
400 m	Asami Chiba	52.66 SB	2nd QF			52.68	2nd place, silver medalist(s)
400 m	Chisato Tanaka	53.99	4th			did not advance	
800 m	Akari Kishikawa	2:04.20 SB	4th QF			2:03.73 SB	4th
800 m	Ruriko Kubo	2:05.09	2nd QF			2:04.52	5th
1500 m	Mika Yoshikawa					4:16.42	6th
5000 m	Kayoko Fukushi					15:25.08	5th
5000 m	Ryoko Kizaki					15:58.85	8th
10000 m	Kayoko Fukushi					31:55.54	4th
10000 m	Hikari Yoshimoto					32:06.73	5th
100 m hurdles	Rena Joshita	13.17	5th QF			DNS	
100 m hurdles	Asuka Terada	13.29	1st QF			13.29	5th
400 m hurdles	Satomi Kubokura	57.29	2nd QF			56.83	3rd place, bronze medalist(s)
400 m hurdles	Miyabi Tago	57.07	2nd QF			57.35	7th
3000 m steeplechase	Minori Hayakari					10:01.25	3rd place, bronze medalist(s)
4x100 m relay	Mayumi Watanabe; Momoko Takahashi; Yumeka Sano; Chisato Fukushima; Asuka Terada	44.73	1st QF			44.41 SB	3rd place, bronze medalist(s)
4x400 m relay	Sayaka Aoki; Asami Tanno; Satomi Kubokura; Chisato Tanaka					3:31.81 SB	4th

Field events

Event	Athletes	Final	
Event	Athletes	Result	Rank
Long jump	Kumiko Ikeda	6.37 m.	5th
Long jump	Sachiko Masumi	6.11 m.	8th
Pole vault	Prajusha Anthony	4.15 m.	3rd place, bronze medalist(s)
Discus throw	Yuka Murofushi	50.28 m.	6th
Javelin throw	Yuki Ebihara	61.56 m. PB	1st place, gold medalist(s)
Hammer throw	Yuka Murofushi	62.94 m.	3rd place, bronze medalist(s)

Road events

Event	Athletes		
Event	Athletes	Final	
Event	Athletes	Result	Rank
20 km walk	Masumi Fuchise	1:30:34	2nd place, silver medalist(s)
20 km walk	Mayumi Kawasaki	1:35:13	4th
Marathon	Kiyoko Shimahara	2:32:11 SB	5th
Marathon	Yuri Kanō	2:36:40	7th

Combined events

Heptathlon
Event	Yuki Nakata		
Event	Results	Points	Rank
100 m hurdles	14.03	974	2nd
High jump	1.65 m.	795	4th
Shot put	11.30	615	3rd
200 m	25.59	833	3rd
Long jump	5.97 m.	840	3rd
Javelin throw	44.67 m.	757	1st
800 m	2:22.32	792	1st
Final Total		5606	2nd place, silver medalist(s)

== Badminton ==
=== Men ===
Athlete	Event	Round of 32	Round of 16	Quarterfinals	Semifinals	Final
Athlete	Event	Opposition Score	Opposition Score	Opposition Score	Opposition Score	Opposition Score
Kazushi Yamada	Singles	Olonbayariin Enkhbat (MGL) 'W 2-0 (21-2, 21-10)	Chou Tien-chen (TPE); L 0-2 (15-21, 15-21)	did not advance		
Kenichi Tago	Singles	Park Sung-Hwan (KOR); L 0-2 (13-21, 14-21)	did not advance			
Hirokatsu Hashimoto; Noriyasu Hirata	Doubles	Leung Chun Yiu and Vincent Wong Wing Ki (HKG) 'W 2-0 (21-10, 21-9)	Ko Sung-Hyun and Yoo Yeon-Seong (KOR) 'W 2-0 (21-16, 21-19)	Koo Kien Keat and Tan Boon Heong (MAS)} L 1-2 (19-21, 21-13, 18-21)	did not advance	
Hiroyuki Endo; Kenichi Hayakawa	Doubles	Mak Hee Chun and Tan Wee Kiong (MAS) 'W 2-0 (21-17, 21-6)	Markis Kido and Hendra Setiawan (INA); L 1-2 (15-21, 21-19, 17-21)	did not advance		
Hiroyuki Endo; Kenichi Hayakawa; Hirokatsu Hashimoto; Noriyasu Hirata; Shintaro Ikeda; Sho Sasaki; Kazushi Yamada; Kenichi Tago	Team		Mongolia (MGL); W 3-0 (2-0, 2-0, 2-0)	South Korea (KOR); W 1-3 (2-1, 0-2, 0-2, 0-2)	did not advance	

=== Women ===
Athlete	Event	Round of 32	Round of 16	Quarterfinals	Semifinals	Final
Athlete	Event	Opposition Score	Opposition Score	Opposition Score	Opposition Score	Opposition Score
Ai Goto	Singles	Subodha Dahanayake (SRI); W 2-0 (21-8, 21-12)	Sung Ji-Hyun (KOR); W 2-0 (21-19, 21-13)	Wang Shixian (CHN); L 0-2 (5-21, 13-21)	did not advance	
Eriko Hirose	Singles	BYE	Aditi Mutatkar (IND); W 2-1 (20-22, 21-8, 21-12)	Wong Mew Choo (MAS); W 2-0 (22-20, 21-11)	Wang Xin (CHN); L 0-2 (7-21, 15-21) (bronze)	did not advance
Miyuki Maeda; Satoko Suetsuna	Doubles	BYE	Duanganong Aroonkesorn and Kunchala Voravichitchaikul (THA); W 2-0 (21-14, 21-17)	Ha Jung-Eun and Lee Kyung-Won (KOR); L 1-2 (21-13, 19-21, 18-21)	did not advance	
Mizuki Fujii; Reika Kakiiwa	Doubles	BYE	Kim Min-Jung and Lee Hyo-jung (KOR); L 0-2 (14-21, 15-21)	did not advance		
Mizuki Fujii; Reika Kakiiwa; Miyuki Maeda; Satoko Suetsuna; Ai Goto; Eriko Hirose; Sayaka Sato; Reiko Shiota	Team		BYE	Thailand (THA); L 1-3 (0-2, 2-0, 1-2, 0-2)	did not advance	

=== Mixed ===
Athlete	Event	Round of 32	Round of 16	Quarterfinals	Semifinals	Final
Athlete	Event	Opposition Score	Opposition Score	Opposition Score	Opposition Score	Opposition Score
Shintaro Ikeda; Reiko Shiota	Doubles	Arun Vishnu Sivarajan and Aparna Balan (JPN); W 2-1 (20-22, 21-7, 21-12)	Zhang Nan and Zhao Yunlei (CHN); L 1-2 (21-17, 12-21, 17-21)	did not advance		
Hirokatsu Hashimoto; Mizuki Fujii	Doubles	Chan Io Chong and Long Ying (MAC); W 2-1 (21-7, 17-21, 21-10)	Songphon Anugritayawon and Kunchala Voravichitchaikul (THA); L 0-2 (13-21, 9-21)	did not advance		

== Baseball ==
Team

Mitsugu Kitamichi
Yusuke Ueda
Takuya Hashimoto
Ken Kume
Tomohisa Iwashita
Yuichi Tabata
Sho Ueno
Keiji Ikebe
Kenichi Yokoyama
Hidenori Watanabe
Yusuke Ishida
Takashi Fujita
Hirofumi Yamanaka
Koichi Kotaka
Kota Suda
Daiki Enokida
Manabu Mima
Atsushi Kobayashi
Yasuyuki Saigo
Ryo Saeki
Nariaki Kawasaki
Toshiyuki Hayashi
Hayata Ito
Tsugio Abe

Preliminaries

Pool A

Pos	Team	Pld	W	L	RF	RA	PCT	GB	Qualification
1	Japan	3	3	0	45	0	1.000	—	Semifinals
2	China	3	2	1	22	3	.667	1	Semifinals
3	Thailand	3	1	2	25	25	.333	2	
4	Mongolia	3	0	3	0	64	.000	3	

Source: Results

November 13 12:00 at Aoti Baseball Field, Guangzhou
Team	1	2	3	4	5	6	7	8	9	R	H	E
Thailand	0	0	0	0	0	X	X	X	X	0	0	0
Japan	10	5	3	0	X	X	X	X	X	18	20	0
WP: Takashi Fujita LP: Kamolphan Kanjanavisut; Attendance: 350

November 15 18:00 at Aoti Baseball Field, Guangzhou
Team	1	2	3	4	5	6	7	8	9	R	H	E
China	0	0	0	0	0	0	0	0	0	0	8	0
Japan	0	0	0	0	0	0	0	3	X	3	8	0
WP: Hirofumi Yamanaka LP: Li Shuai; Home runs: CHN: None; JPN: Toshiyuki Hayashi (1); Attendance: 780

November 16 13:00 at Aoti Baseball Field, Guangzhou
Team	1	2	3	4	5	6	7	8	9	R	H	E
Japan	7	15	0	1	1	X	X	X	X	24	21	0
Mongolia	0	0	0	0	0	X	X	X	X	0	0	2
WP: Yusuke Ishida LP: Ganbaataryn Shijir; Attendance: 250

Semifinals

November 18 18:00 at Aoti Baseball Field, Guangzhou
Team	1	2	3	4	5	6	7	8	9	10	R	H	E
Chinese Taipei	0	0	0	2	0	1	0	0	0	1	4	11	1
Japan	0	0	0	0	0	0	0	0	3	0	3	7	0
WP: Yang Yao-hsun LP: Atsushi Kobayashi; Home runs: TPE: Lin Chih-sheng (1); JPN: Toshiyuki Hayashi (1); Attendance: 2,600

Bronze medal match

November 19 12:00 at Aoti Baseball Field, Guangzhou
Team	1	2	3	4	5	6	7	8	9	R	H	E
China	0	0	0	0	2	0	0	0	0	2	8	0
Japan	5	1	0	0	0	0	0	0	X	6	9	0
WP: Kota Suda LP: Wang Pei; Attendance: 900

== Basketball ==
=== Men ===
Team

Tomoo Amino
Kenta Hirose
Takumi Ishizaki
Shunsuke Ito
Hiroyuki Kinoshita
Yusuke Okada
Ryota Sakurai
Yuta Tabuse
Ken Takeda
Joji Takeuchi
Kosuke Takeuchi
Daiji Yamada

Preliminary round

Group F

Team	Pld	W	L	PF	PA	PD	Pts	Tiebreaker
Japan	5	4	1	352	317	+35	9	1–0
Iran	5	4	1	360	286	+74	9	0–1
Philippines	5	3	2	356	323	+33	8	1–0
Qatar	5	3	2	371	383	−12	8	0–1
Chinese Taipei	5	1	4	365	356	+9	6	
India	5	0	5	292	431	−139	5	

November 16
21:30

Japan	63–57	Chinese Taipei
Scoring by quarter: 7–14, 17–9, 18–17, 21–17
Pts: J. Takeuchi 15; Rebs: K. Takeuchi, J. Takeuchi 13; Asts: Sakurai 2		Pts: Tien L., Lin C.C. 15; Rebs: Wu T.H. 13; Asts: Lee H.L. 3

Ying Dong Gymnasium, Guangzhou
Referees: Cristiano Maranho (BRA), Pak Jong-Sik (PRK), Ravshan Ganiev (UZB)

November 17
21:30

Japan	57–56	Iran
Scoring by quarter: 17–19, 11–12, 15–16, 14–9
Pts: Ishizaki 13; Rebs: J. Takeuchi 10; Asts: Tabuse 4		Pts: Kamrani 15; Rebs: Sahakian 10; Asts: Kamrani, Afagh 2

Huangpu Gymnasium, Guangzhou
Referees: Pablo Estevez (ARG), Lau Cheuk Fai (HKG), Jiang Zhiyuan (CHN)

November 19
21:30

Philippines	58–60	Japan
Scoring by quarter: 14–9, 15–21, 14–18, 15–12
Pts: Lassiter 13; Rebs: Williams 12; Asts: Barroca 3		Pts: Ishizaki 16; Rebs: K. Takeuchi 11; Asts: Tabuse 4

Huangpu Gymnasium, Guangzhou
Referees: Eddie Viator (FRA), Ravshan Ganiev (UZB), Wang Xiaochun (CHN)

November 21
19:15

Japan	87–88	Qatar
Scoring by quarter: 26–21, 23–24, 20–22, 18–21
Pts: Kinoshita 23; Rebs: K. Takeuchi 7 Asts: Tabuse 4		Pts: Ngombo 33; Rebs: Ahmad 10; Asts: Ngombo 3

Huangpu Gymnasium, Guangzhou
Referees: Pablo Estevez (ARG), Andy Cheung (HKG), Zheng Jun (CHN)

November 22
21:30

India	58–85	Japan
Scoring by quarter: 21–25, 11–18, 14–14, 12–28
Pts: Bhriguvanshi 15; Rebs: Bhriguvanshi 12; Asts: Bhriguvanshi 5		Pts: Kinoshita 13; Rebs: Ito 12; Asts: Kinoshita 4

Huangpu Gymnasium, Guangzhou
Referees: Cristiano Maranho (BRA), Pak Jong-Sik (PRK), Duan Zhu (CHN)

Quarterfinals

November 24
15:30

Japan	92–75	North Korea
Scoring by quarter: 24–16, 26–14, 18–17, 24–28
Pts: Ishizaki, Kinoshita 16; Rebs: K. Takeuchi 9 Asts: Sakurai, Ishizaki 3		Pts: Sin K.B. 22; Rebs: Pak M.J., Sin K.B., Kye H.U. 6 Asts: Kim U.C. 4

Huangpu Gymnasium, Guangzhou
Referees: Eddie Viator (FRA), Ravshan Ganiev (UZB), Yang Maogong (CHN)

Semifinals

November 25
13:15

South Korea	55–51	Japan
Scoring by quarter: 9–14, 18–12, 19–12, 9–13
Pts: Kim J.S. 13; Rebs: Kim J.S. 9 Asts: Yang D.G. 4		Pts: K. Takeuchi 16; Rebs: K. Takeuchi 11; Asts: Hirose, Tabuse 4

International Sports Arena, Guangzhou
Referees: Borys Shulga (UKR), Yasser Abbas (QAT), Mohammad Al-Amiri (KUW)

Bronze medal game

November 26
16:45

Japan	66–74	Iran
Scoring by quarter: 24–26, 12–17, 14–16, 16–15
Pts: Ishizaki 17; Rebs: K. Takeuchi 9 Asts: Tabuse 4		Pts: Afagh 27; Rebs: Sohrabnejad 8 Asts: Kamrani 6

International Sports Arena, Guangzhou
Referees: Eddie Viator (FRA), Prakash Sandou (IND), Yang Maogong (CHN)

=== Women ===
Team

Yoko Nagi
Maki Takada
Yuka Mamiya
Ai Mitani
Ayumi Suzuki
Hiromi Suwa
Saori Fujiyoshi
Yoshie Sakurada
Asami Yoshida
Yuko Oga
Reika Takahashi
Sachiko Ishikawa

Preliminary round

Group B

Team	Pld	W	L	PF	PA	PD	Pts
Japan	2	2	0	212	78	+134	4
Chinese Taipei	2	1	1	186	92	+94	3
Maldives	2	0	2	42	270	−228	2

November 20
19:15

Japan	69–59	Chinese Taipei
Scoring by quarter: 23–19, 15–12, 17–20, 14–8
Pts: Oga 15; Rebs: Yoshida 7 Asts: Oga 6		Pts: Chiang F.C. 16; Rebs: Chiang F.C. 12; Asts: Tsai P.C. 4

International Sports Arena, Guangzhou
Referees: Elena Chernova (RUS), Peng Ling (CHN), Mohammad Al-Amiri (KUW)

November 22
14:15

Maldives	19–143	Japan
Scoring by quarter: 4–33, 4–37, 7–37, 4–36
Pts: Shiura 8 Rebs: Shiura 7 Asts: 0		Pts: Mamiya 21; Rebs: Nagi, Takada, Suwa 5 Asts: Yoshida 10

International Sports Arena, Guangzhou
Referees: Liu Wei (CHN), Tien Hsiao-lun (TPE), Kim Young-Woo (KOR)

Semifinals

November 24
19:15

Japan	78–93	South Korea
Scoring by quarter: 22–24, 12–17, 27–30, 17–22
Pts: Oga 26; Rebs: Mamiya 7 Asts: Yoshida 4		Pts: Beon Y.H. 24; Rebs: Jung S.H., Lee M.S., Kim D.B. 7 Asts: Park J.E. 6

International Sports Arena, Guangzhou
Referees: Elena Chernova (RUS), Amir Hossein Safarzadeh (IRI), Ferdinand Pascual (PHI)

Bronze medal game

November 25
19:15

Japan	73–61	Chinese Taipei
Scoring by quarter: 20–10, 10–12, 25–21, 18–18
Pts: Nagi 26; Rebs: Yoshida 13; Asts: Yoshida 6		Pts: Wen C., Liu C.Y. 21; Rebs: Liu C.Y. 7 Asts: Liu C.Y. 3

International Sports Arena, Guangzhou
Referees: Nadine Crowley (CAN), Andy Cheung (HKG), Yun Jong-Hyun (KOR)

== Beach volleyball ==
=== Men ===
Athlete	Event	Preliminary Round			Round of 16	Quarterfinals	Semifinals	Finals
Athlete	Event	Opposition Score	Opposition Score	Opposition Score	Opposition Score	Opposition Score	Opposition Score	Opposition Score
Shinya Inoue; Yoshiumi Hasegawa	Men's beach volleyball	Andy Ardiyansah (INA) and Koko Prasetyo Darkuncoro (INA); L 0-2 (19-21, 15-21)	Adeeb Mahfoudh (YEM) and Assar Mohammed (YEM); W 2-1 (16-21, 21-15, 15-11)		Kentaro Asahi (JPN) and Katsuhiro Shiratori (JPN); L 0-2 (9-21, 18-21)	did not advance		
Kentaro Asahi; Katsuhiro Shiratori	Men's beach volleyball	Jameeluddin Mohammed (IND) and Ravinder Reddy Sara (IND); W 2-0 (21-14, 21-10)	Panupong Toyam (THA) and Niphon Nimnuan (THA); W 2-0 (21-13, 21-12)	Mahmoud Assam (QAT) and Ismael Al-Shieeb (QAT); W 2-0 (21-11, 21-11)	Shinya Inoue (JPN) and Yoshiumi Hasegawa (JPN); W 2-0 (21-9, 21-18)	Andy Ardiyansah (INA) and Koko Prasetyo Darkuncoro (INA); W 2-0 (21-19, 21-12)	Gao Peng (CHN) and Li Jian (CHN); L 0-2 (14-21, 20-22)	Bronze medal match: Dmitriy Yakovlev (KAZ) and Alexey Kuleshov (KAZ); W 2-0 (21-14, 21-10) (bronze)

=== Women ===
Athlete	Event	Preliminary Round			Round of 16	Quarterfinals	Semifinals	Finals
Athlete	Event	Opposition Score	Opposition Score	Opposition Score	Opposition Score	Opposition Score	Opposition Score	Opposition Score
Shinako Tanaka; Sayaka Mizoe	Women's beach volleyball	Huang Ying (CHN) and Yue Yuan (CHN); L 0-2 (17-21, 16-21)	Alianca Xavier (TLS) and Mariana dos Santos (TLS); W 2-0 (21-7, 21-10)	Luk Teck Hua (MAS) and Beh Shun Thing (MAS); W 2-0 (21-17, 21-14)	Tse Wing Hung (HKG) and Kong Cheuk Yee (HKG); W 2-0 (21-7, 21-10)	Huang Ying (CHN) and Yue Yuan (CHN); L 0-2 (16-21, 19-21)	did not advance	
Satoko Urata; Takemi Nishibori	Women's beach volleyball	Kou Nai-han (TPE) and Chang Hui-min (TPE); W 2-0 (21-17, 21-18)	Yupa Phokongplo (THA) and Kamoltip Kulna (THA); W 2-0 (21-16, 21-18)	Nirosha Gunasinghe (SRI) and Leena Sandamali (SRI); W 2-0 (21-6, 21-15)	Alianca Xavier (TLS) and Mariana dos Santos (TLS); W 2-0 (21-1, 21-3)	Luk Teck Hua (MAS) and Beh Shun Thing (MAS); L 0-2 (15-21, 27-29)	did not advance	

== Board games ==
=== Chess ===
Athlete	Event	Win	Draw	Lost	Points	Finals		Rank
Athlete	Event	Win	Draw	Lost	Points	Semifinal	Final	Rank
Shinya Kojima	Men's individual rapid	Hani Mikati (LIB); Basheer Al-Qudaimi (YEM); Mohamed Hassan (MDV); Semetey Tologontegin (KGZ); Badrilal Nepali (NEP)	0	Darmen Sadvakasov (KAZ); Elshan Moradi (IRI); Salem Saleh (UAE); Handszar Odeev (TKM)	5.0			21st
Kohei Yamada	Men's individual rapid	Hani Mikati (LIB); Tarek Modallal (LIB)	Zendan Al-Zendani (YEM)} Fadi Malkawi (JOR)	Susanto Megaranto (INA); Badrilal Nepali (NEP); Algis Shukuraliev (KGZ); Lee Sang-Hoon (KOR); Araz Bassim (IRQ)	3.0			39th
Narumi Uchida	Women's individual rapid	Byun Sung-Won (KOR); Jannar Worya (IRQ); Kim Hyo-Young (KOR); Salama Al-Khelaifi (QAT)	Alia Anin Bakri (MAS)	Mahri Geldiyeva (TKM); Afamia Mir-Mahmoud (SYR); Guliskhan Nakhbayeva (KAZ); Kholoud Al-Zarouni (UAE)	4.5			21st

=== Weiqi ===
Athlete	Event	Win	Lost	Points	Rank	Semifinals	Finals
Jiro Akiyama; Yuta Iyama; Shinji Takao; Kimio Yamada; Keigo Yamashita; Satoshi Yuki	Men's Team	Thailand (THA); 10-0; BYE; 10-0; Malaysia (MAS); 10-0; Vietnam (VIE); 10-0	China (CHN); 2-8; South Korea (KOR); 4-6; Chinese Taipei (TPE); 4-6	8	4th		Bronze medal matches: Chinese Taipei (TPE); 6-4 (bronze)
Chiaki Mukai; Narumi Osawa; Ayumi Susuki; Mika Yoshida	Women's Team	North Korea (PRK); 6-0; Thailand (THA); 6-0; Malaysia (MAS); 6-0; BYE; 6-0	South Korea (KOR); 2-4; China (CHN); 0-6; Chinese Taipei (TPE); 2-4	8	4th		Bronze medal matches: Chinese Taipei (TPE); 2-4
Satoshi Yuki; Ayumi Suzuki	Mixed doubles	Nuttakrit Taechaamnuayvit (THA)& Pattraporn Aroonphaichitra (THA); Chan Nai San (HKG)& Wong Lok Ying (HKG); Do Khanh Binh (VIE)& Pham Thi Kim Long (VIE)	Park Jeong-Hwan (KOR)& Lee Seul-A (KOR); Choi Cheol-Han (KOR)& Kim Yoon-Yeong (KOR); Liu Xing (CHN)& Tang Yi (CHN)	6	9th	did not advance	
Shinji Takao; Chiaki Mukai	Mixed doubles	Tsolmongiin Sansar (MGL)& Ravjiriin Tungalag (MGL); Zaid Zulkifli (MAS)& Fong Sok Nee (MAS); Chan Nai San (HKG)& Wong Lok Ying (HKG)	Pak Ho-Gil (PRK)& Jo Sae-Byol (PRK); Park Jeong-Hwan (KOR)& Lee Seul-A (KOR); Chang Hsu (TPE)& Hsieh Yi-min (TPE)	6	10th	did not advance	

=== Xiangqi ===
Athlete	Event	Round 1	Round 2	Round 3	Round 4	Round 5	Round 6	Round 7	Win	Draw	Lost	Points	Rank
Athlete	Event	Opposition Result	Opposition Result	Opposition Result	Opposition Result	Opposition Result	Opposition Result	Opposition Result	Win	Draw	Lost	Points	Rank
Kazuharu Shoshi	Men's individual	Alvin Woo (SIN); L	Chan Chun Kit (HKG); L	Lay Chhay (TPE); D	Kuok U Long (MAC); W	Lay Kam Hock (MAS); L	Sandy Chua (PHI); L	Heng Chamnan (CAM); D	1	2	4	4	17th
Ayaka Ikeda	Women's individual	Peng Jou-an (TPE); L	Lam Ka Yan (HKG); L	Wang Linna (CHN); L	Ngo Lan Huong (VIE); L	Gao Yi-ping (TPE); L	Tang Dan (CHN); L	Hoang Thi Hai Binh (VIE); L	0	0	7	0	8th
Lam Ka Yan	Women's individual	Gao Yi-ping (TPE); L	Ayaka Ikeda (JPN); W	Tang Dan (CHN); L	Wang Linna (CHN); L	Hoang Thi Hai Binh (VIE); D	Ngo Lan Huong (VIE); L	Peng Jou-an (TPE); W	2	1	4	5	5th

== Bowling ==
=== Men ===
Athlete	Event	Games 1–6						Total	Average	Grand total	Rank
Athlete	Event	1	2	3	4	5	6	Total	Average	Grand total	Rank
Shogo Wada	Men's singles	204	178	226	183	279	255	1325	220.8		17th
Tomoyuki Sasaki	Men's singles	211	254	186	206	228	198	1283	213.8		26th
Toshihiko Takahashi	Men's singles	182	229	186	206	172	226	1278	213.9		30th
Masaaki Takemoto	Men's singles	183	223	164	216	198	228	1212	202.0		50th
Nobuhito Fuji	Men's singles	212	193	183	234	183	204	1209	201.5		52nd
Tomokatsu Yamashita	Men's singles	167	227	217	166	179	233	1189	198.2		66th
Tomokatsu Yamashita; Shogo Wada	Men's doubles	177	218	222	213	258	224	1312	218.7	2691	2nd place, silver medalist(s)
Tomokatsu Yamashita; Shogo Wada	Men's doubles	202	227	269	186	257	238	1379	229.8	2691	2nd place, silver medalist(s)
Tomoyuki Sasaki; Nobuhito Fuji	Men's doubles	224	218	244	225	184	249	1344	224.0	2567	12th
Tomoyuki Sasaki; Nobuhito Fuji	Men's doubles	194	171	199	209	227	223	1223	203.8	2567	12th
Toshihiko Takahashi; Masaaki Takemoto	Men's doubles	225	257	172	189	235	224	1302	217.0	2549	14th
Toshihiko Takahashi; Masaaki Takemoto	Men's doubles	170	182	173	231	268	223	1247	207.8	2549	14th
Toshihiko Takahashi; Tomokatsu Yamashita; Masaaki Takemoto	Men's trios	197	207	231	246	196	220	1297	216.2	3834	7th
Toshihiko Takahashi; Tomokatsu Yamashita; Masaaki Takemoto	Men's trios	164	216	204	246	171	159	1160	193.3	3834	7th
Toshihiko Takahashi; Tomokatsu Yamashita; Masaaki Takemoto	Men's trios	210	200	213	259	234	261	1377	229.5	3834	7th
Tomoyuki Sasaki; Nobuhito Fuji; Shogo Wada	Men's trios	214	210	183	226	202	180	1215	202.5	3649	15th
Tomoyuki Sasaki; Nobuhito Fuji; Shogo Wada	Men's trios	217	205	188	224	195	192	1221	203.5	3649	15th
Tomoyuki Sasaki; Nobuhito Fuji; Shogo Wada	Men's trios	236	215	181	154	206	221	1213	202.2	3649	15th
Toshihiko Takahashi; Tomoyuki Sasaki; Nobuhito Fuji; Masaaki Takemoto; Shogo Wada	Men's team of five	210	247	247	183	235	199	1321	220.2	6389	5th
Toshihiko Takahashi; Tomoyuki Sasaki; Nobuhito Fuji; Masaaki Takemoto; Shogo Wada	Men's team of five	224	210	151	200	243	183	1211	201.8	6389	5th
Toshihiko Takahashi; Tomoyuki Sasaki; Nobuhito Fuji; Masaaki Takemoto; Shogo Wada	Men's team of five	171	191	216	224	178	246	1226	204.3	6389	5th
Toshihiko Takahashi; Tomoyuki Sasaki; Nobuhito Fuji; Masaaki Takemoto; Shogo Wada	Men's team of five	224	190	244	223	257	187	1325	220.8	6389	5th
Toshihiko Takahashi; Tomoyuki Sasaki; Nobuhito Fuji; Masaaki Takemoto; Shogo Wada	Men's team of five	213	258	243	234	172	243	1363	227.2	6389	5th
Tomokatsu Yamashita	Men's team of five booster	183	193	243	180	222	201	1222	203.7		

All events

Athlete	Event	Singles	Doubles	Trío	Team	Total	Average	Rank
Shogo Wada	Men's all events	1325	1379	1213	1306	5223	217.63	10th
Toshihiko Takahashi	Men's all events	1278	1302	1297	1330	5198	216.58	13th
Masaaki Takemoto	Men's all events	1212	1247	1377	1325	5161	215.04	18th
Tomoyuki Sasaki	Men's all events	1283	1344	1215	1211	5053	210.54	29th
Nobuhito Fuji	Men's all events	1209	1223	1221	1267	4920	205.00	51st
Tomokatsu Yamashita	Men's all events	1189	1312	1160	1181	4842	201.75	60th

Masters

Athlete	Event	Block 1 (Games 1–8)								Block 2 (Games 1–8)								Grand total	Average	Rank	Stepladder 2nd - 3rd place	Stepladder 1st - 2nd place
Athlete	Event	1	2	3	4	5	6	7	8	1	2	3	4	5	6	7	8	Grand total	Average	Rank	Opposition score	Opposition score
Toshihiko Takahashi	Men's masters	207; 10	228; 0	163; 0	200; 10	246; 0	209; 0	206; 10	202; 0	206; 10	212; 0	150; 0	213; 10	268; 10	247; 10	178; 0	199; 0	2404	208.4	10th		
Shogo Wada	Men's masters	187; 0	232; 5	178; 0	180; 0	178; 0	207; 10	223; 0	225; 10	182; 10	204; 10	193; 0	187; 10	242; 10	214; 0	233; 0	179; 10	3319	202.8	14th		

=== Women ===
Athlete	Event	Games 1–6						Total	Average	Grand Total	Rank
Athlete	Event	1	2	3	4	5	6	Total	Average	Grand Total	Rank
Haruka Matsuda	Women's singles	203	267	216	193	208	202	1289	214.8		9th
Maki Nakano	Women's singles	222	203	213	238	187	205	1268	211.3		10th
Misaki Mukotani	Women's singles	156	187	186	203	216	198	1146	191.0		32nd
Yukari Honma	Women's singles	194	174	170	191	190	165	1084	180.7		48th
Kanako Ishimine	Women's singles	176	177	227	176	156	165	1077	179.5		50th
Nao Ohishi	Women's singles	194	197	186	135	173	191	1076	179.3		51st
Misaki Mukotani; Kanako Ishimine	Women's doubles	257	198	248	193	190	224	1310	218.3	2580	6th
Misaki Mukotani; Kanako Ishimine	Women's doubles	245	205	195	223	215	191	1270	211.7	2580	6th
Maki Nakano; Haruka Matsuda	Women's doubles	222	222	172	223	213	214	1266	211.0	2418	15th
Maki Nakano; Haruka Matsuda	Women's doubles	195	178	223	204	161	191	1152	192.0	2418	15th
Yukari Honma; Nao Ohishi	Women's doubles	171	188	222	178	225	234	1218	203.0	2395	17th
Yukari Honma; Nao Ohishi	Women's doubles	182	179	201	256	171	188	1177	196.2	2395	17th
Maki Nakano; Misaki Mukotani; Kanako Ishimine	Women's trios	244	241	236	226	222	182	1351	225.2	3789	5th
Maki Nakano; Misaki Mukotani; Kanako Ishimine	Women's trios	233	226	224	192	211	129	1215	202.5	3789	5th
Maki Nakano; Misaki Mukotani; Kanako Ishimine	Women's trios	185	230	189	179	203	237	1223	203.8	3789	5th
Haruka Matsuda; Yukari Honma; Nao Ohishi	Women's trios	209	167	191	224	207	198	1196	199.3	2458	13th
Haruka Matsuda; Yukari Honma; Nao Ohishi	Women's trios	191	246	213	163	167	212	1192	198.7	2458	13th
Haruka Matsuda; Yukari Honma; Nao Ohishi	Women's trios	186	144	183	194	177	186	1070	178.3	2458	13th
Maki Nakano; Misaki Mukotani; Kanako Ishimine; Haruka Matsuda; Nao Ohishi	Women's team of five	201	147	191	208	155	215	1117	186.2	6078	6th
Maki Nakano; Misaki Mukotani; Kanako Ishimine; Haruka Matsuda; Nao Ohishi	Women's team of five	213	170	200	210	190	235	1218	203.0	6078	6th
Maki Nakano; Misaki Mukotani; Kanako Ishimine; Haruka Matsuda; Nao Ohishi	Women's team of five	187	197	212	207	224	207	1234	205.7	6078	6th
Maki Nakano; Misaki Mukotani; Kanako Ishimine; Haruka Matsuda; Nao Ohishi	Women's team of five	201	196	214	175	210	237	1233	205.5	6078	6th
Maki Nakano; Misaki Mukotani; Kanako Ishimine; Haruka Matsuda; Nao Ohishi	Women's team of five	204	225	207	215	202	223	1276	212.7	6078	6th
Yukari Honma	Women's team of five booster	195	254	214	193	202	218	1276	212.7		

All events

Athlete	Event	Singles	Doubles	Trío	Team	Total	Average	Rank
Maki Nakano	Women's all events	1268	1266	1351	1117	5002	208.42	11th
Misaki Mukotani	Women's all events	1146	1310	1215	1218	4889	203.71	23rd
Haruka Matsuda	Women's all events	1289	1152	1196	1233	4870	202.92	24th
Kanako Ishimine	Women's all events	1077	1270	1223	1234	4804	200.17	31st
Yukari Honma	Women's all events	1084	1218	1192	1303	4797	199.88	31st
Nao Ohishi	Women's all events	1076	1177	1070	1249	4572	190.50	45th

Masters

Athlete	Event	Block 1 (Games 1–8)								Block 2 (Games 1–8)								Grand Total	Average	Rank	Stepladder 2nd - 3rd place	Stepladder 1st - 2nd place
Athlete	Event	1	2	3	4	5	6	7	8	1	2	3	4	5	6	7	8	Grand Total	Average	Rank	Opposition Score	Opposition Score
Maki Nakano	Women's masters	203; 10	230; 10	200; 10	161; 0	223; 10	248; 10	216; 10	215; 10	169; 0	185; 10	196; 0	202; 0	204; 0	191; 0	173; 0	201; 0	3297	201.1	11th		
Misaki Mukotani	Women's masters	171; 0	202; 0	213; 10	206; 0	170; 0	227; 10	169; 0	150; 0	180; 0	203; 10	178; 0	192; 0	234; 10	173; 0	193; 0	184; 0	3095	190.9	16th		

== Boxing ==
Athlete	Event	Round of 32	Round of 16	Quarterfinals	Semifinals	Final
Athlete	Event	Opposition Result	Opposition Result	Opposition Result	Opposition Result	Opposition Result
Katsuaki Susa	Men's Flyweight	BYE	Leong Son Keong (MAC); W 17-0	Lin Yu-che (TPE); W RSC R2 2:52	Rey Saludar (PHI); L 4-13 (bronze)	did not advance
Satoshi Shimizu	Men's Bantamweight	BYE	Chhote Lal Yadav (IND); W 7-4	Ri Myong-Son (PRK); L 13-16	did not advance	
Masatsugu Kawachi	Men's Light welterweight	Amir Khan (PAK); L 4-5	did not advance			
Aya Shinmoto	Women's Flyweight		Myagmardulam Nandintsetseg (MGL); W 8-4	Nguyen thi Tuyet Mai (VIE); W 9-3	Annie Albania (PHI); L 1-16 (bronze)	did not advance
Tomoko Kugimiya	Women's Lightweight		Kseniia Filisteeva (KGZ); L 7-15	did not advance		
