= Baseball at the 2010 Asian Games =

- Venue: Aoti Baseball Field
- Dates: 13–19 November 2010
- Competitors: 171 from 8 nations

Baseball at the 2010 Asian Games was held in Guangzhou, Guangdong, China from November 13 to 19, 2010. Only a men's competition was held. All games were played at the Aoti Baseball Field. South Korea beat Chinese Taipei 9–3 in the final to win the gold medal.

== Schedule ==
P	Preliminary round	½	Semifinals	F	Finals

Event↓/Date →	13th Sat	14th Sun	15th Mon	16th Tue	17th Wed	18th Thu	19th Fri
Men	P	P	P	P		½	F

== Medalists ==
Event	Gold	Silver	Bronze
Men	South Korea; An Ji-man; Cho Dong-chan; Jeong Keun-woo; Kim Kang-min; Lee Dae-ho; Son Si-hyun; Choi Jeong; Lee Yong-kyu; Kang Jung-ho; Choo Shin-soo; Chong Tae-hyon; Park Kyung-oan; Kim Myung-sung; Yoon Suk-min; Im Tae-hoon; Ko Chang-seong; Lee Jong-wook; Song Eun-beom; Kang Min-ho; Kim Hyun-soo; Bong Jung-keun; Kim Tae-kyun; Yang Hyeon-jong; Ryu Hyun-jin	Chinese Taipei; Hu Chin-lung; Lee Bing-yen; Lin Yi-chuan; Chen Yung-chi; Lin Ying-chieh; Lo Ching-lung; Pan Wei-lun; Hsiao Yi-chieh; Lin Kun-sheng; Kuo Yen-wen; Peng Cheng-min; Lin Che-hsuan; Lo Kuo-hui; Chen Chun-hsiu; Lin Chih-sheng; Kao Chih-kang; Yang Chien-fu; Chen Kuan-yu; Chang Tai-shan; Chang Chien-ming; Yang Yao-hsun; Lin Yi-hao; Huang Chih-lung; Chen Hung-wen	Japan; Mitsugu Kitamichi; Yusuke Ueda; Takuya Hashimoto; Ken Kume; Tomohisa Iwashita; Yuichi Tabata; Sho Ueno; Keiji Ikebe; Kenichi Yokoyama; Hidenori Watanabe; Yusuke Ishida; Takashi Fujita; Hirofumi Yamanaka; Koichi Kotaka; Kota Suda; Daiki Enokida; Manabu Mima; Atsushi Kobayashi; Yasuyuki Saigo; Ryo Saeki; Nariaki Kawasaki; Toshiyuki Hayashi; Hayata Ito; Tsugio Abe

== Draw ==
Pool A

- China
- Japan
- Mongolia
- ~~Sri Lanka~~*
- Thailand

Pool B

- Chinese Taipei
- South Korea
- Hong Kong
- Pakistan

* Withdrew.

== Squads ==
Squads

China	Chinese Taipei	Hong Kong	Japan
Yang Yang; Chen Junyi; Li Lei; Dong Shi; Zhang Yufeng; Bu Tao; Hou Fenglian; Lü Jiangang; Wang Pei; Li Ziliang; Li Hongrui; Li Shuai; Wang Chao; Cui Xiao; Hao Guochen; Chu Fujia; Jia Delong; Chen Kun; Zhang Deyang; Wang Wei; Zhang Hongbo; Lai Guojun; Lin Xiaofan; Feng Fei	Hu Chin-lung; Lee Bing-yen; Lin Yi-chuan; Chen Yung-chi; Lin Ying-chieh; Lo Ching-lung; Pan Wei-lun; Hsiao Yi-chieh; Lin Kun-sheng; Kuo Yen-wen; Peng Cheng-min; Lin Che-hsuan; Lo Kuo-hui; Chen Chun-hsiu; Lin Chih-sheng; Kao Chih-kang; Yang Chien-fu; Chen Kuan-yu; Chang Tai-shan; Chang Chien-ming; Yang Yao-hsun; Lin Yi-hao; Huang Chih-lung; Chen Hung-wen	Tsang Kai Kong; Gabriel Colina Au; Enroy Chiu; Nau Ching Nam; Chan Chun Wah; Ng Yuk Ming; Au Wing Leung; Wu Tsz Fung; Duncan Chau; Leung Yu Chung; Yeung Kun Hin; Kenneth Chiu; Yung Tsun Wai; Tang Shu Nin; Colin Ip; Chan Kei Wa; Li Wing Sing; Leung Ho Nam; Wu Chun Yeung; Chu Ho Yuen; Tony Wu; Tsang Kin Chung	Mitsugu Kitamichi; Yusuke Ueda; Takuya Hashimoto; Ken Kume; Tomohisa Iwashita; Yuichi Tabata; Sho Ueno; Keiji Ikebe; Kenichi Yokoyama; Hidenori Watanabe; Yusuke Ishida; Takashi Fujita; Hirofumi Yamanaka; Koichi Kotaka; Kota Suda; Daiki Enokida; Manabu Mima; Atsushi Kobayashi; Yasuyuki Saigo; Ryo Saeki; Nariaki Kawasaki; Toshiyuki Hayashi; Hayata Ito; Tsugio Abe
Mongolia	Pakistan	South Korea	Thailand
Tsogttsembeliin Javkhlan; Batboldyn Khatanbaatar; Tömörkhuyagiin Davaa-Ochir; Battulgyn Uuganmyagmar; Nergüin Baasandorj; Gankhuyagiin Khüreltulga; Oyuunbaataryn Tamir; Saintsogtyn Chinbat; Ganbaataryn Shijir; Batsükhiin Baasandorj; Shagdaryn Otgonbayar; Chültemiin Mönkhsaikhan	Zaheer Bashir; Muhammad Usman Azam; Zubair Nawaz; Muhammad Asif Mushtaq; Muhammad Asif; Muhammad Sumair Zawar; Mussdiq Hanif; Imtiaz Ali; Muhammad Usman; Zafar Iqbal; Muhammad Iftikhar; Sarfraz Ahmed; Arshad Khan; Saleem Haider; Ihsanullah; Dur-i-Hussain; Umair Imdad Bhatti; Muhammad Farooq Khan	An Ji-man; Cho Dong-chan; Jeong Keun-woo; Kim Kang-min; Lee Dae-ho; Son Si-hyun; Choi Jeong; Lee Yong-kyu; Kang Jung-ho; Choo Shin-soo; Chong Tae-hyon; Park Kyung-oan; Kim Myung-sung; Yoon Suk-min; Im Tae-hoon; Ko Chang-seong; Lee Jong-wook; Song Eun-beom; Kang Min-ho; Kim Hyun-soo; Bong Jung-keun; Kim Tae-kyun; Yang Hyeon-jong; Ryu Hyun-jin	Putiporn Chawala; Bongkot Ananthanasan; Jittiphong Chong-on; Adichat Wongvichit; Sek Sitthikaew; Apichat Ngamying; Nirun Jaroenkitsiriwong; Somsak Sarnwit; Jirapod Srisaipet; Chidsanu Janrak; Anukul Sudsawad; Siraphop Nadee; Nattapong Sampahangsit; Teerasak Kongsabai; Sanyalak Pipatpinyo; Chanatip Thongbai; Nattapong Meeboonrod; Thongthana Siraputtidech; Suratit Faengsup; Yannapat Arpornsiri; Wissaroot Sihamat; Kamolphan Kanjanavisut; Chaiyot Sirintharanon

== Results ==
All times are China Standard Time (UTC+08:00)

=== Preliminaries ===
==== Pool A ====
Pos	Team	Pld	W	L	RF	RA	PCT	GB	Qualification
1	Japan	3	3	0	45	0	1.000	—	Semifinals
2	China	3	2	1	22	3	.667	1	Semifinals
3	Thailand	3	1	2	25	25	.333	2	
4	Mongolia	3	0	3	0	64	.000	3	

Source: Results

13 November; 12:00	Japan	18–0 (F/5)	Thailand	Aoti Baseball Field, Guangzhou; Attendance: 350; Umpires: Yang Jianxiang (CHN)
13 November; 12:00	WP: Takashi Fujita		LP: Kamolphan Kanjanavisut	Aoti Baseball Field, Guangzhou; Attendance: 350; Umpires: Yang Jianxiang (CHN)

Team	1	2	3	4	5	6	7	8	9	R	H	E
Thailand	0	0	0	0	0	—	—	—	—	0	0	0
Japan	10	5	3	0	X	—	—	—	—	18	20	0

14 November; 12:00	China	15–0 (F/5)	Mongolia	Aoti Baseball Field, Guangzhou; Attendance: 300; Umpires: Kim Chan-kyun (KOR)
14 November; 12:00	WP: Lü Jiangang		LP: Batboldyn Khatanbaatar	Aoti Baseball Field, Guangzhou; Attendance: 300; Umpires: Kim Chan-kyun (KOR)

Team	1	2	3	4	5	6	7	8	9	R	H	E
Mongolia	0	0	0	0	0	—	—	—	—	0	1	4
China	4	9	1	0	1	—	—	—	—	15	10	0

15 November; 13:00	Thailand	25–0 (F/5)	Mongolia	Aoti Baseball Field, Guangzhou; Attendance: 103; Umpires: Hung Fan-chung (TPE)
15 November; 13:00	WP: Siraphop Nadee		LP: Chültemiin Mönkhsaikhan	Aoti Baseball Field, Guangzhou; Attendance: 103; Umpires: Hung Fan-chung (TPE)

Team	1	2	3	4	5	6	7	8	9	R	H	E
Mongolia	0	0	0	0	0	—	—	—	—	0	2	4
Thailand	1	5	4	15	X	—	—	—	—	25	20	1

15 November; 18:00	Japan	3–0	China	Aoti Baseball Field, Guangzhou; Attendance: 780; Umpires: Hsieh Liang-kuei (TPE)
15 November; 18:00	WP: Hirofumi Yamanaka		LP: Li Shuai	Aoti Baseball Field, Guangzhou; Attendance: 780; Umpires: Hsieh Liang-kuei (TPE)
15 November; 18:00	HR: Toshiyuki Hayashi (1)			Aoti Baseball Field, Guangzhou; Attendance: 780; Umpires: Hsieh Liang-kuei (TPE)

Team	1	2	3	4	5	6	7	8	9	R	H	E
China	0	0	0	0	0	0	0	0	0	0	8	0
Japan	0	0	0	0	0	0	0	3	X	3	8	0

16 November; 13:00	Mongolia	0–24 (F/5)	Japan	Aoti Baseball Field, Guangzhou; Attendance: 250; Umpires: Li Weigeng (CHN)
16 November; 13:00	LP: Ganbaataryn Shijir		WP: Yusuke Ishida	Aoti Baseball Field, Guangzhou; Attendance: 250; Umpires: Li Weigeng (CHN)

Team	1	2	3	4	5	6	7	8	9	R	H	E
Japan	7	15	0	1	1	—	—	—	—	24	21	0
Mongolia	0	0	0	0	0	—	—	—	—	0	0	2

16 November; 18:00	China	7–0	Thailand	Aoti Baseball Field, Guangzhou; Attendance: 680; Umpires: Jonathan Wong (HKG)
16 November; 18:00	WP: Bu Tao		LP: Nattapong Meeboonrod	Aoti Baseball Field, Guangzhou; Attendance: 680; Umpires: Jonathan Wong (HKG)

Team	1	2	3	4	5	6	7	8	9	R	H	E
Thailand	0	0	0	0	0	0	0	0	0	0	5	1
China	0	2	3	2	0	0	0	0	X	7	12	0

==== Pool B ====
Pos	Team	Pld	W	L	RF	RA	PCT	GB	Qualification
1	South Korea	3	3	0	38	1	1.000	—	Semifinals
2	Chinese Taipei	3	2	1	28	7	.667	1	Semifinals
3	Pakistan	3	1	2	6	31	.333	2	
4	Hong Kong	3	0	3	3	36	.000	3	

Source: Results

13 November; 13:00	Hong Kong	3–5	Pakistan	Aoti Baseball Field, Guangzhou; Attendance: 450; Umpires: Kwon Young-ik (KOR)
13 November; 13:00	LP: Leung Yu Chung		WP: Ihsanullah	Aoti Baseball Field, Guangzhou; Attendance: 450; Umpires: Kwon Young-ik (KOR)

Team	1	2	3	4	5	6	7	8	9	R	H	E
Pakistan	0	0	0	0	0	1	1	0	3	5	11	1
Hong Kong	0	0	1	0	2	0	0	0	0	3	5	4

13 November; 18:00	South Korea	6–1	Chinese Taipei	Aoti Baseball Field, Guangzhou; Attendance: 665; Umpires: Seiichi Hayashi (JPN)
13 November; 18:00	WP: Ryu Hyun-jin		LP: Lin Yi-hao	Aoti Baseball Field, Guangzhou; Attendance: 665; Umpires: Seiichi Hayashi (JPN)
13 November; 18:00	HR: Choo Shin-soo (2)			Aoti Baseball Field, Guangzhou; Attendance: 665; Umpires: Seiichi Hayashi (JPN)

Team	1	2	3	4	5	6	7	8	9	R	H	E
Chinese Taipei	0	0	0	0	0	1	0	0	0	1	7	1
South Korea	2	0	2	0	0	2	0	0	X	6	10	0

14 November; 13:00	Chinese Taipei	11–1 (F/8)	Pakistan	Aoti Baseball Field, Guangzhou; Attendance: 350; Umpires: Chen Minggao (CHN)
14 November; 13:00	WP: Pan Wei-lun		LP: Muhammad Asif	Aoti Baseball Field, Guangzhou; Attendance: 350; Umpires: Chen Minggao (CHN)
14 November; 13:00	HR: Chen Yung-chi (1)			Aoti Baseball Field, Guangzhou; Attendance: 350; Umpires: Chen Minggao (CHN)

Team	1	2	3	4	5	6	7	8	9	R	H	E
Pakistan	0	0	0	0	0	0	0	1	—	1	4	7
Chinese Taipei	0	1	2	3	0	3	0	2	—	11	12	0

14 November; 18:00	South Korea	15–0 (F/6)	Hong Kong	Aoti Baseball Field, Guangzhou; Attendance: 400; Umpires: Takanori Suzuki (JPN)
14 November; 18:00	WP: Im Tae-hoon		LP: Duncan Chau]	Aoti Baseball Field, Guangzhou; Attendance: 400; Umpires: Takanori Suzuki (JPN)
14 November; 18:00	HR: Kang Jung-ho (1)			Aoti Baseball Field, Guangzhou; Attendance: 400; Umpires: Takanori Suzuki (JPN)

Team	1	2	3	4	5	6	7	8	9	R	H	E
Hong Kong	0	0	0	0	0	0	—	—	—	0	3	2
South Korea	0	3	0	2	4	6	—	—	—	15	12	0

15 November; 12:00	Chinese Taipei	16–0 (F/5)	Hong Kong	Aoti Baseball Field, Guangzhou; Attendance: 420; Umpires: Li Yulu (CHN)
15 November; 12:00	WP: Lin Ying-chieh		LP: Kenneth Chiu	Aoti Baseball Field, Guangzhou; Attendance: 420; Umpires: Li Yulu (CHN)
15 November; 12:00	HR: Lin Yi-chuan (1)			Aoti Baseball Field, Guangzhou; Attendance: 420; Umpires: Li Yulu (CHN)

Team	1	2	3	4	5	6	7	8	9	R	H	E
Hong Kong	0	0	0	0	0	—	—	—	—	0	4	1
Chinese Taipei	3	3	4	6	X	—	—	—	—	16	11	0

16 November; 12:00	Pakistan	0–17 (F/5)	South Korea	Aoti Baseball Field, Guangzhou; Attendance: 450; Umpires: Zhu Sheng (CHN)
16 November; 12:00	LP: Saleem Haider		WP: Kim Myung-sung	Aoti Baseball Field, Guangzhou; Attendance: 450; Umpires: Zhu Sheng (CHN)

Team	1	2	3	4	5	6	7	8	9	R	H	E
South Korea	3	4	1	0	9	—	—	—	—	17	15	1
Pakistan	0	0	0	0	0	—	—	—	—	0	2	4

=== Final round ===
Semifinals
18 November
Japan	3
Chinese Taipei (F/10)	4
18 November
South Korea	7
China	1

Gold medal match
19 November
Chinese Taipei	3
South Korea	9
Bronze medal match
19 November
Japan	6
China	2

==== Semifinals ====
18 November; 12:00	South Korea	7–1	China	Aoti Baseball Field, Guangzhou; Attendance: 1,350; Umpires: Takanori Suzuki (JPN)
18 November; 12:00	WP: Yang Hyeon-jong		LP: Lü Jiangang	Aoti Baseball Field, Guangzhou; Attendance: 1,350; Umpires: Takanori Suzuki (JPN)
18 November; 12:00	HR: Choo Shin-soo (1)			Aoti Baseball Field, Guangzhou; Attendance: 1,350; Umpires: Takanori Suzuki (JPN)

Team	1	2	3	4	5	6	7	8	9	R	H	E
China	0	0	1	0	0	0	0	0	0	1	4	1
South Korea	0	2	1	0	3	0	1	0	X	7	10	0

18 November; 18:00	Japan	3–4 (F/10)	Chinese Taipei	Aoti Baseball Field, Guangzhou; Attendance: 2,600; Umpires: Kim Chan-kyun (KOR)
18 November; 18:00	LP: Atsushi Kobayashi		WP: Yang Yao-hsun	Aoti Baseball Field, Guangzhou; Attendance: 2,600; Umpires: Kim Chan-kyun (KOR)
18 November; 18:00	HR: Toshiyuki Hayashi (1)		HR: Lin Chih-sheng (1)	Aoti Baseball Field, Guangzhou; Attendance: 2,600; Umpires: Kim Chan-kyun (KOR)

Team	1	2	3	4	5	6	7	8	9	10	R	H	E
Chinese Taipei	0	0	0	2	0	1	0	0	0	1	4	11	1
Japan	0	0	0	0	0	0	0	0	3	0	3	7	0

==== Bronze medal match ====
19 November; 12:00	Japan	6–2	China	Aoti Baseball Field, Guangzhou; Attendance: 900; Umpires: Hsieh Liang-kuei (TPE)
19 November; 12:00	WP: Kota Suda		LP: Wang Pei	Aoti Baseball Field, Guangzhou; Attendance: 900; Umpires: Hsieh Liang-kuei (TPE)

Team	1	2	3	4	5	6	7	8	9	R	H	E
China	0	0	0	0	2	0	0	0	0	2	8	0
Japan	5	1	0	0	0	0	0	0	X	6	9	0

==== Gold medal match ====
19 November; 18:00	Chinese Taipei	3–9	South Korea	Aoti Baseball Field, Guangzhou; Attendance: 3,500; Umpires: Seiichi Hayashi (JPN)
19 November; 18:00	LP: Pan Wei-lun		WP: Yoon Suk-min	Aoti Baseball Field, Guangzhou; Attendance: 3,500; Umpires: Seiichi Hayashi (JPN)
19 November; 18:00			HR: Lee Dae-ho (1), Kang Jung-ho (2)	Aoti Baseball Field, Guangzhou; Attendance: 3,500; Umpires: Seiichi Hayashi (JPN)

Team	1	2	3	4	5	6	7	8	9	R	H	E
South Korea	1	1	4	0	0	0	1	0	2	9	17	2
Chinese Taipei	1	0	0	2	0	0	0	0	0	3	8	1

== Final standing ==
Rank	Team	Pld	W	L
1st place, gold medalist(s)	South Korea	5	5	0
2nd place, silver medalist(s)	Chinese Taipei	5	3	2
3rd place, bronze medalist(s)	Japan	5	4	1
4	China	5	2	3
5	Pakistan	3	1	2
5	Thailand	3	1	2
7	Hong Kong	3	0	3
7	Mongolia	3	0	3
