= List of Nippon Professional Baseball players (L) =

The following is a list of Nippon Professional Baseball players with the last name starting with L, retired or active.

== L ==
Name	Debut	Final Game	Position	Teams	Ref
Greg LaRocca					
Chris Latham					
Byung-Kyu Lee					
Corey Lee					
Jong-Beom Lee					
Leon Lee					
Samson Lee					
Seung-Yeop Lee					
Tu-Hsuan Lee					
Phil Leftwich					
Donald Lemon					
Colby Lewis					
Jeff Liefer					
Chang-Yong Lim					
En-Yu Lin					
In-Che Lin					
Wei-Chu Lin					
Yi-Hao Lin					
Omar Linares					
Doug Loman					
Luis Lopez born 1964					
Luis Lopez born 1973					
Torey Lovullo					
Chengan Lu					
Eric Ludwick					
David Lundquist					
Joe Lutz					
Scott Lydy					
