= Go at the 2010 Asian Games – Men's team =

Men's team at the 2010 Asian Games
- Venue: Guangzhou Chess Institute
- Date: 23–26 November 2010
- Competitors: 41 from 7 nations

Medalists
gold medal	South Korea; Lee Chang-ho, Kang Dong-yun, Lee Se-dol, Cho Han-seung, Park Jeong-hwan, Choi Cheol-han
silver medal	China; Chang Hao, Gu Li, Liu Xing, Kong Jie, Xie He, Zhou Ruiyang
bronze medal	Japan; Keigo Yamashita, Yuta Iyama, Shinji Takao, Satoshi Yuki, Kimio Yamada, Jiro Akiyama

The men's team competition at the 2010 Asian Games in Guangzhou, China was held from 23 November to 26 November at the Guangzhou Chess Institute. The time was one hour for each side and 30 seconds byoyomi for three times.

== Schedule ==
All times are China Standard Time (UTC+08:00)

Date	Time	Event
Tuesday, 23 November 2010	09:30	Round 1
Tuesday, 23 November 2010	15:00	Round 2
Wednesday, 24 November 2010	09:30	Round 3
Wednesday, 24 November 2010	15:00	Round 4
Thursday, 25 November 2010	09:30	Round 5
Thursday, 25 November 2010	15:00	Round 6
Friday, 26 November 2010	09:30	Round 7
Friday, 26 November 2010	15:00	Finals

== Results ==
=== Preliminary round ===
==== Round 1 ====
	Score	
China	10–0	Bye
Chang Hao	2–0	
Gu Li	2–0	
Liu Xing	2–0	
Kong Jie	2–0	
Xie He	2–0	
South Korea	10–0	Vietnam
Kang Dong-yun	2–0	Hoàng Nam Thắng
Lee Se-dol	2–0	Phạm Minh Quang
Cho Han-seung	2–0	Nguyễn Mạnh Linh
Park Jeong-hwan	2–0	Bùi Lê Khánh Lâm
Choi Cheol-han	2–0	Đỗ Khánh Bình
Chinese Taipei	10–0	Malaysia
Cho U	2–0	Teng Boon Ping
Wang Ming-wan	2–0	Zaid Zulkifli
Chen Shih-yuan	2–0	Tiong Kee Soon
Lin Chih-han	2–0	Orpheus Leong
Hsiao Cheng-hao	2–0	Kew Chien Chong
Thailand	0–10	Japan
Vorawat Charoensitthisathien	0–2	Keigo Yamashita
Nuttakrit Taechaamnuayvit	0–2	Yuta Iyama
Rit Bencharit	0–2	Shinji Takao
Ruechagorn Trairatananusorn	0–2	Kimio Yamada
Apidet Jirasophin	0–2	Jiro Akiyama

==== Round 2 ====
	Score	
Bye	0–10	Japan
	0–2	Keigo Yamashita
	0–2	Yuta Iyama
	0–2	Shinji Takao
	0–2	Kimio Yamada
	0–2	Jiro Akiyama
Malaysia	2–8	Thailand
Teng Boon Ping	2–0	Vorawat Charoensitthisathien
Zaid Zulkifli	0–2	Rit Bencharit
Tiong Kee Soon	0–2	Ruechagorn Trairatananusorn
Orpheus Leong	0–2	Apidet Jirasophin
Kew Chien Chong	0–2	Theera Rungruangtaweepong
Vietnam	0–10	Chinese Taipei
Hoàng Nam Thắng	0–2	Cho U
Phạm Minh Quang	0–2	Wang Ming-wan
Nguyễn Mạnh Linh	0–2	Chen Shih-yuan
Bùi Lê Khánh Lâm	0–2	Lin Chih-han
Đỗ Khánh Bình	0–2	Hsiao Cheng-hao
China	2–8	South Korea
Chang Hao	0–2	Lee Chang-ho
Gu Li	0–2	Kang Dong-yun
Kong Jie	2–0	Lee Se-dol
Xie He	0–2	Cho Han-seung
Zhou Ruiyang	0–2	Park Jeong-hwan

==== Round 3 ====
	Score	
South Korea	10–0	Bye
Lee Chang-ho	2–0	
Kang Dong-yun	2–0	
Lee Se-dol	2–0	
Cho Han-seung	2–0	
Park Jeong-hwan	2–0	
Chinese Taipei	2–8	China
Cho U	2–0	Chang Hao
Wang Ming-wan	0–2	Gu Li
Chen Shih-yuan	0–2	Liu Xing
Lin Chih-han	0–2	Kong Jie
Hsiao Cheng-hao	0–2	Zhou Ruiyang
Thailand	6–4	Vietnam
Vorawat Charoensitthisathien	0–2	Hoàng Nam Thắng
Nuttakrit Taechaamnuayvit	2–0	Phạm Minh Quang
Rit Bencharit	2–0	Nguyễn Mạnh Linh
Ruechagorn Trairatananusorn	2–0	Bùi Lê Khánh Lâm
Apidet Jirasophin	0–2	Đỗ Khánh Bình
Japan	10–0	Malaysia
Keigo Yamashita	2–0	Teng Boon Ping
Yuta Iyama	2–0	Zaid Zulkifli
Satoshi Yuki	2–0	Tiong Kee Soon
Kimio Yamada	2–0	Orpheus Leong
Jiro Akiyama	2–0	Kew Chien Chong

==== Round 4 ====
	Score	
Bye	0–10	Malaysia
	0–2	Teng Boon Ping
	0–2	Zaid Zulkifli
	0–2	Tiong Kee Soon
	0–2	Orpheus Leong
	0–2	Kew Chien Chong
Vietnam	0–10	Japan
Hoàng Nam Thắng	0–2	Keigo Yamashita
Phạm Minh Quang	0–2	Yuta Iyama
Nguyễn Mạnh Linh	0–2	Satoshi Yuki
Bùi Lê Khánh Lâm	0–2	Kimio Yamada
Đỗ Khánh Bình	0–2	Jiro Akiyama
China	8–2	Thailand
Chang Hao	2–0	Vorawat Charoensitthisathien
Gu Li	2–0	Nuttakrit Taechaamnuayvit
Liu Xing	0–2	Rit Bencharit
Kong Jie	2–0	Ruechagorn Trairatananusorn
Zhou Ruiyang	2–0	Theera Rungruangtaweepong
South Korea	8–2	Chinese Taipei
Kang Dong-yun	0–2	Cho U
Lee Se-dol	2–0	Chen Shih-yuan
Cho Han-seung	2–0	Lin Chih-han
Park Jeong-hwan	2–0	Hsiao Cheng-hao
Choi Cheol-han	2–0	Chou Chun-hsun

==== Round 5 ====
	Score	
Chinese Taipei	10–0	Bye
Cho U	2–0	
Wang Ming-wan	2–0	
Chen Shih-yuan	2–0	
Lin Chih-han	2–0	
Hsiao Cheng-hao	2–0	
Thailand	0–10	South Korea
Vorawat Charoensitthisathien	0–2	Kang Dong-yun
Nuttakrit Taechaamnuayvit	0–2	Lee Se-dol
Rit Bencharit	0–2	Cho Han-seung
Apidet Jirasophin	0–2	Park Jeong-hwan
Theera Rungruangtaweepong	0–2	Choi Cheol-han
Japan	2–8	China
Keigo Yamashita	2–0	Gu Li
Yuta Iyama	0–2	Liu Xing
Shinji Takao	0–2	Kong Jie
Satoshi Yuki	0–2	Xie He
Kimio Yamada	0–2	Zhou Ruiyang
Malaysia	4–6	Vietnam
Teng Boon Ping	0–2	Hoàng Nam Thắng
Zaid Zulkifli	2–0	Phạm Minh Quang
Tiong Kee Soon	0–2	Nguyễn Mạnh Linh
Orpheus Leong	0–2	Bùi Lê Khánh Lâm
Kew Chien Chong	2–0	Đỗ Khánh Bình

==== Round 6 ====
	Score	
Bye	0–10	Vietnam
	0–2	Hoàng Nam Thắng
	0–2	Phạm Minh Quang
	0–2	Nguyễn Mạnh Linh
	0–2	Bùi Lê Khánh Lâm
	0–2	Đỗ Khánh Bình
China	10–0	Malaysia
Chang Hao	2–0	Teng Boon Ping
Gu Li	2–0	Zaid Zulkifli
Kong Jie	2–0	Tiong Kee Soon
Xie He	2–0	Orpheus Leong
Zhou Ruiyang	2–0	Kew Chien Chong
South Korea	6–4	Japan
Lee Chang-ho	0–2	Keigo Yamashita
Lee Se-dol	0–2	Yuta Iyama
Cho Han-seung	2–0	Shinji Takao
Park Jeong-hwan	2–0	Satoshi Yuki
Choi Cheol-han	2–0	Kimio Yamada
Chinese Taipei	10–0	Thailand
Cho U	2–0	Vorawat Charoensitthisathien
Chen Shih-yuan	2–0	Nuttakrit Taechaamnuayvit
Lin Chih-han	2–0	Rit Bencharit
Hsiao Cheng-hao	2–0	Ruechagorn Trairatananusorn
Chou Chun-hsun	2–0	Apidet Jirasophin

==== Round 7 ====
	Score	
Thailand	10–0	Bye
Vorawat Charoensitthisathien	2–0	
Nuttakrit Taechaamnuayvit	2–0	
Rit Bencharit	2–0	
Ruechagorn Trairatananusorn	2–0	
Apidet Jirasophin	2–0	
Japan	4–6	Chinese Taipei
Keigo Yamashita	0–2	Cho U
Yuta Iyama	2–0	Wang Ming-wan
Satoshi Yuki	2–0	Lin Chih-han
Kimio Yamada	0–2	Hsiao Cheng-hao
Jiro Akiyama	0–2	Chou Chun-hsun
Malaysia	0–10	South Korea
Teng Boon Ping	0–2	Kang Dong-yun
Tiong Kee Soon	0–2	Lee Se-dol
Orpheus Leong	0–2	Cho Han-seung
Kew Chien Chong	0–2	Park Jeong-hwan
Koh Song Sang	0–2	Choi Cheol-han
Vietnam	0–10	China
Hoàng Nam Thắng	0–2	Chang Hao
Phạm Minh Quang	0–2	Liu Xing
Nguyễn Mạnh Linh	0–2	Kong Jie
Bùi Lê Khánh Lâm	0–2	Xie He
Đỗ Khánh Bình	0–2	Zhou Ruiyang

==== Summary ====
Rank	Team	Round							Total	GP
Rank	Team	1	2	3	4	5	6	7	Total	GP
1	South Korea (KOR)	2	2	2	2	2	2	2	14	62
2	China (CHN)	2	0	2	2	2	2	2	12	56
3	Chinese Taipei (TPE)	2	2	0	0	2	2	2	10	50
4	Japan (JPN)	2	2	2	2	0	0	0	8	50
5	Thailand (THA)	0	2	2	0	0	0	2	6	26
6	Vietnam (VIE)	0	0	0	0	2	2	0	4	20
7	Malaysia (MAS)	0	0	0	2	0	0	0	2	16

=== Final round ===
==== Bronze medal match ====
	Score	
Chinese Taipei	4–6	Japan
Cho U	2–0	Keigo Yamashita
Chen Shih-yuan	0–2	Yuta Iyama
Lin Chih-han	2–0	Shinji Takao
Hsiao Cheng-hao	0–2	Satoshi Yuki
Chou Chun-hsun	0–2	Jiro Akiyama

==== Gold medal match ====
	Score	
South Korea	8–2	China
Lee Chang-ho	2–0	Gu Li
Kang Dong-yun	2–0	Liu Xing
Lee Se-dol	0–2	Kong Jie
Park Jeong-hwan	2–0	Xie He
Choi Cheol-han	2–0	Zhou Ruiyang
