= Kweon Kab-yong =

South Korean Go player (1957–2023)

Personal information
- Native name: 권갑용 (Korean); 権甲龍 (Korean)
- Born: 3 October 1957 South Korea
- Died: 23 January 2023 (aged 65) South Korea

Sport
- Turned pro: 1975
- Pupil: Lee Sedol, Choi Cheol-han, Won Seong-jin, Chen Shiyuan, Park Junghwan, Lee Younggu, Yun Junsang, Kim Jiseok
- Rank: 9 dan

Kweon Kab-yong (3 October 1957 – 23 January 2023) was a South Korean 9 dan professional Go player. Kweon turned professional in 1975. He started a Go school in Korea in 1989 that is often compared to Kitani Minoru's school. As of 2003, his school had produced over 100 total dans.

== Pupils ==
- Lee Sedol 9 dan – winner of 18 international titles.
- Choi Cheol-han 9 dan – ranks 10th for most titles in Korean go history.
- Won Seong-jin 9 dan – winner of the GS Caltex Cup in 2010.
- Chen Shiyuan 9 dan – top Taiwanese player and winner of the 4th Japan-Taiwan Jingying.
- Park Junghwan 9 dan – youngest Korean 9 dan.
- Lee Younggu 8 dan – runner-up of the Prices Information Cup in 2007.
- Yun Junsang 9 dan – won the national champion, Guksu, in 2006.
- Kim Jiseok 9 dan – won most games (71) and the Prices Information Cup in 2009.

== See also ==
- Go professional
