= Yingjiu =

Yingjiu may refer to following individuals of which given name in Chinese character can be transliterated to Hanyu Pinyin:

- Ei-Q (瑛九) (pinyin: Yīngjiǔ; 1911–1960), Japanese artist
- Lee Young-gu (李映九) (pinyin: Lǐ Yìngjiǔ; born 1987), Korean professional Go player
- Ma Ying-jeou (馬英九) (pinyin: Mǎ Yīngjiǔ; born 1950), Taiwanese politician, president of the Republic of China (2008-2016)
