= 4th Japan-Taiwan Jingying =

The 4th Japan-Taiwan Jingying was held on 4–5 June 2011. Chen Shiyuan was the winner of the tournament, defeating compatriot Lin Zhihan in the final.

== Tournament ==
Round of 16
4 June
(Japan) Yamada Kimio	1
(Taiwan) Wang Yuanjun	0
4 June
(Japan) O Rissei	1
(Taiwan) Lin Lixiang	0
4 June
(Japan) Ogata Masaki	0
(Taiwan) Chen Shiyuan	1
4 June
(Japan) Rin Kanketsu	1
(Taiwan) Zhang Kaixin	0
4 June
(Japan) Takao Shinji	0
(Taiwan) Lin Zhihan	1
4 June
(Japan) Xie Ximin	0
(Taiwan) Zhou Junxun	1
4 June
(Japan) Chiaki Mukai	0
(Taiwan) Xiao Zhenghao	1
4 June
(Japan) O Meien	0
(Taiwan) Ye Hongyuan	1

Quarter-finals
4 June
Yamada Kimio	1
O Rissei	0
4 June
Chen Shiyuan	1
Rin kanketsu	0
4 June
Lin Zhihan	1
Zhou Junxun	0
4 June
Xiao Zhenghao	1
Ye Hongyuan	0

Semi-finals
5 June
Yamada Kimio	0
Chen Shiyuan	1
5 June
Lin Zhihan	1
Xiao Zhenghao	0

Final
5 June
Chen Shiyuan	1
Lin Zhihan	0
