= Ko Reibun =

Chinese Go player

Personal information
- Native name: こうれいぶん (Japanese); 孔令文 (Chinese); Kǒng Lìngwén (Pinyin)
- Full name: Ko Reibun
- Born: September 24, 1981 (age 44) Hebei, China

Sport
- Turned pro: 1997
- Teacher: Yasuro Kikuchi
- Rank: 7 dan
- Affiliation: Nihon Ki-in

Ko Reibun (Chinese: 孔令文; pinyin: Kǒng Lìngwén; born September 24, 1981, in Hebei), né Nie Yuncong (Chinese: 聂云骢; pinyin: Niè Yúncōng), is a professional Go player.

== Biography ==
Rin became a professional in 1997. He is the son of one of the greatest Chinese players, Nie Weiping 9 dan, and his mother is Kong Xiangming 8 dan. He moved to Japan to study under Yasuro Kikuchi. He is a Nihon Ki-in pro taking part in tournaments.

He is now a naturalised Japanese, and has a Japanese wife Kobayashi Sayaka, daughter of Kobayashi Satoru. He is currently 7 dan.
