= Yasuro Kikuchi =

Japanese Go player (1929–2021)

Personal information
- Native name: 菊池康郎 (Japanese)
- Full name: Yasuro Kikuchi
- Born: August 20, 1929 Kamata, Ota, Tokyo, Japan
- Died: November 3, 2021 (aged 92)

Sport
- Rank: 8 dan (A)

Yasuro Kikuchi (菊池 康郎, Kikuchi Yasurō; August 20, 1929 – November 3, 2021) was a Japanese amateur Go player.

== Biography ==
Kikuchi founded the prestigious Ryokusei Academy in 1975, which has become one of the most prolific Go schools in Japan. Some of the most famous players to come out of the academy include Kikuyo Aoki (current Women's Meijin), Atsushi Kato, Jiro Akiyama, Tomochika Mizokami (winner of many youth titles), and Keigo Yamashita (four times Kisei). Kikuchi's other students include Shinichi Aoki, Ryuichi Muramatsu, Keiichi Tsurumaru, Yoshimichi Suzuki, Atsushi Katsura, Ko Reibun.

He has won many amateur titles, his biggest coming in 1992 when he won the World Amateur Go Championship. He also came in third place at the 2003 competition. He still actively participated in professional Go competitions that allow amateurs to enter, such as the Meijin tournament where he won games in a preliminary round in 2001. In 2003, he beat Ryu Shikun by resignation in the Agon Cup at the age of 73.

== Bibliography ==
- アマ四強はこうして強くなった [Ama 4-kyowa koushite tsuyokunatta] (in Japanese). Seibundo Shinkosha. 1967-01-01.
- 菊池康郎打碁集 [Kikuchi Yasuro Uchigoshū] (in Japanese). Seibundo Shinkosha. 1979-03-01.
- 囲碁に強くなる本 上達への秘密作戦 [Igoni tsuyokunaru hon - jotasuheno himitu sakusen] (in Japanese). Kin'ensha. 1980.
- 囲碁の初歩の初歩 これで碁が打てる [Igono shohono shoho - korede goga uteru] (in Japanese). Kin'ensha. 1980.
- 緑星学園—囲碁を通じて人間育成 夢とおどろき [Ryokusei gakuen - igowo tsujite ningen ikusei - yumeto odoroki] (in Japanese). Floral Shuppan. 2002.
- Kikuchi, Yasuro (2006-02-20). "岡目八目" [Okame hachimoku] (in Japanese). Yomiuri Shimbun.
