= Shinichi Aoki =

Japanese professional Go player

Personal information
- Native name: 青木紳一 (Japanese)
- Full name: Shinichi Aoki
- Born: June 9, 1965 (age 61) Kanagawa, Japan

Sport
- Teacher: Yasuro Kikuchi
- Rank: 9 dan
- Affiliation: Nihon Ki-in

Shinichi Aoki (青木 紳一, Aoki Shin'ichi; born June 9, 1965 in Kanagawa, Japan) is a Japanese professional Go player.

== Biography ==
Shinichi is the older brother of female 8 dan go player, Kikuyo Aoki. He studied under Yasuro Kikuchi. He has over 400 wins as a professional in his career.

== Titles ==
Title	Years Held
Defunct	1
(Japan) NEC Shun-Ei	1988
