= Atsushi Kato =

Japanese Go player

Personal information
- Native name: 加藤充志 (Japanese)
- Full name: Atsushi Kato
- Born: August 14, 1974 (age 51) Tokyo, Japan

Sport
- Turned pro: 1990
- Teacher: Yasuro Kikuchi
- Rank: 9 dan
- Affiliation: Nihon Ki-in

Atsushi Kato (加藤 充志, Katō Atsushi; born August 14, 1974) is a professional Go player.

== Biography ==
Kato became a professional in 1990, and in the same year was promoted to 2 dan. In 1996, he had already reached 6 dan, and became 9 dan in 2011. As an insei, he was taught by Yasuro Kikuchi. Kato has been part of the Kisei league consistently for the last few years.

== Promotion record ==
Rank	Year	Notes
1 dan	1990	
2 dan	1990	
3 dan	1991	
4 dan	1992	
5 dan	1994	
6 dan	1996	
7 dan	1998	
8 dan	2001	
9 dan	2011	
