= Japan-Taiwan Jingying =

Go competition between Japan and Taiwan

The Japan-Taiwan Jingying is a Go competition consisting of players from Japan and Taiwan. The style is a knockout with 16 players, eight each from Japan and Taiwan.

== Past winners and runners-up ==
| Year | Winner | Runner-up |
|---|---|---|
| 2008 | So Yokoku | Iyama Yuta |
| 2009 | Kono Rin | Chen Shiyuan |
| 2010 | Zhou Junxun | Matsumoto Takehisa |
| 2011 | Chen Shiyuan | Lin Zhihan |
