= Son Si-hyun =

South Korean baseball player (born 1980)

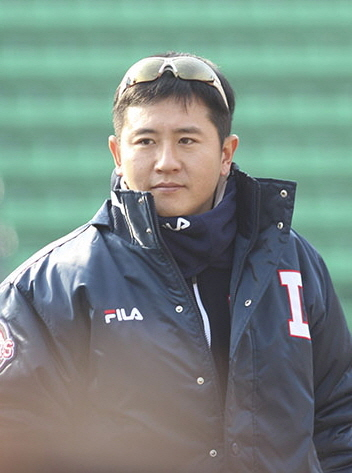
- Shortstop
- Born: October 19, 1980 (age 45); Seoul, South Korea
- Batted: Right Threw: Right

KBO debut
- July 1, 2003, for the Doosan Bears

Last KBO appearance
- October 1, 2019, for the NC Dinos

KBO statistics
- Batting average: .272
- Home runs: 70
- Runs batted in: 550
- Stats at Baseball Reference

Teams
- Doosan Bears (2003–2013); NC Dinos (2014–2019)

Career highlights and awards
- 2× KBO League Golden Glove Award winner (2005, 2009)
Medals
Men's baseball
Representing South Korea
Asian Games
Gold medal – first place	2010 Guangzhou	Team

- Son Si-hyun
- Hangul: 손시헌
- Hanja: 孫時憲
- RR: Son Siheon
- MR: Son Sihŏn

Son Si-hyun (Korean: 손시헌; born October 19, 1980) is a South Korean former professional baseball shortstop. He played in the KBO League for the Doosan Bears and NC Dinos from 2003 to 2019. He batted and threw right-handed.

== Professional career ==
In 2003, Son went undrafted after a college career at Dong-eui University in Busan, and began his professional career with the Doosan Bears second team as a free agent trainee. After demonstrating his strong defensive abilities in the farm league, he was added to the Bears 26-man first team roster on July 1, 2003. After being promoted to the first team, he appeared in 59 games as a backup shortstop and batted .220 with 6 RBI.

In 2004, Son became the team's full-time shortstop. For that year he played 122 games, all at shortstop, and hit .231 with 39 RBI and 45 runs. In 2005, Son rose to his full potential, batting .276 with a career-high 59 runs and 60 RBI, and winning his first KBO League Golden Glove Award at shortstop.

After finishing the 2006 season with a .267 batting average and 34 RBI, he left the team to serve the mandatory military commitment. During the two-year duty in Korean Armed Forces Athletic Corps, Son continued to play baseball in their baseball club on the side. Son was selected for the first time in the South Korea national baseball team in 2007 for the Baseball World Cup. In 2008 he got called up to the national team again and competed in the IBAF Final Olympic Qualifying Tournament as the only amateur player.

After being discharged from military service at the end of 2008, Son came back to the Bears. Then he blossomed in the 2009 season, when he posted career-highs in home runs (11), batting average (.289), hits (112), doubles (22) and stolen bases (6) with 59 RBI and 56 runs, and won his second Golden Glove Award.

On September 6, 2010, Son was selected for the South Korea national baseball team to compete in the 2010 Asian Games in Guangzhou, China.

=== Notable international careers ===
Year	Venue	Competition	Team	Individual note
2007	Chinese Taipei	Baseball World Cup	5th	All-Star (SS)
2008	Chinese Taipei	Final Olympic Qualifying Tournament	Silver medal	.250 BA (1-for-4), 2 R
2010	China	Asian Games	Gold medal	.353 BA (6-for-17), 2 RBI
2013	Chinese Taipei	World Baseball Classic	9th	.000 BA (0-for-1)
