= Kim Myung-sung =

South Korean baseball player (born 1988)

- Pitcher
- Born: April 8, 1988 (age 37); Seoul, South Korea
- Bats: Right Throws: Right

KBO debut
- May 8, in 2011, for the Lotte Giants

KBO statistics (through 2016 season)
- Win–loss record: 1–1
- Earned run average: 6.18
- Strikeouts: 25
- Stats at Baseball Reference

Teams
- Lotte Giants (2011–2012); Doosan Bears (2012–2016)

- Kim Myung-sung
- Hangul: 김명성
- Hanja: 金明成
- RR: Gim Myeongseong
- MR: Kim Myŏngsŏng

Kim Myung-sung (Korean: 김명성; born April 8, 1988) is a South Korean pitcher. He bats and throws right-handed. Kim was selected fifth overall by the Lotte Giants in the 2011 KBO Draft.

== Amateur career ==
Kim was born in Seoul, and completed his mediocre high school career at Jangchung High School in Seoul, where his main position was an infielder. Kim went undrafted in the 2007 KBO Draft, and enrolled at Chung-Ang University to continue his baseball career.

Kim began his collegiate career as a third baseman in 2007, but the freshman infielder, who had a weak bat but a strong arm, converted from a position player to a pitcher.

Kim broke out in the 2009 season with a 5–2 record and a 2.71 ERA, appearing in 16 games as a starting pitcher. In July, he was called up to the South Korean national baseball team for the 2009 Asian Baseball Championship held in Sapporo, Japan. In the championship, Kim made only one appearance for the team, tossing 0.1 innings of relief against Team Japan.

Kim had another strong season in 2010, posting a record of 6–0 and an ERA of 1.72 and allowing only one home run in 68 innings pitched. In July 2010, Kim was called up to play for Korea in the Korea-USA Baseball Championship Series. He started in Game 2 of the series and hurled 5.1 innings of two-run ball with 5 strikeouts against Team USA. On September 6, Kim was selected as the only amateur player of the final 24 members for the 2010 Asian Games in Guangzhou, China. Kim tossed 2.1 shutout innings in South Korea's 17-0 win over Pakistan in the group round of the baseball tournament at the Asian Games, allowing only one hit and racking up three strikeouts.

=== Notable international careers ===
Year	Venue	Competition	Team	Individual note
2009	Japan	Asian Baseball Championship	Bronze medal	0-0; 0.00 ERA (1 G, 0.1 IP, 0 ER)
2010	United States	South Korea vs USA Baseball Championship	0W-5L	0-1; 3.00 ERA (2 G, 6.0 IP, 2 ER, 5 K)
2010	China	Asian Games	Gold medal	1-0; 0.00 ERA (1 G, 2.1 IP, 0 ER, 3 K)
