= Chen Hung-wen =

Taiwanese baseball player (born 1986)

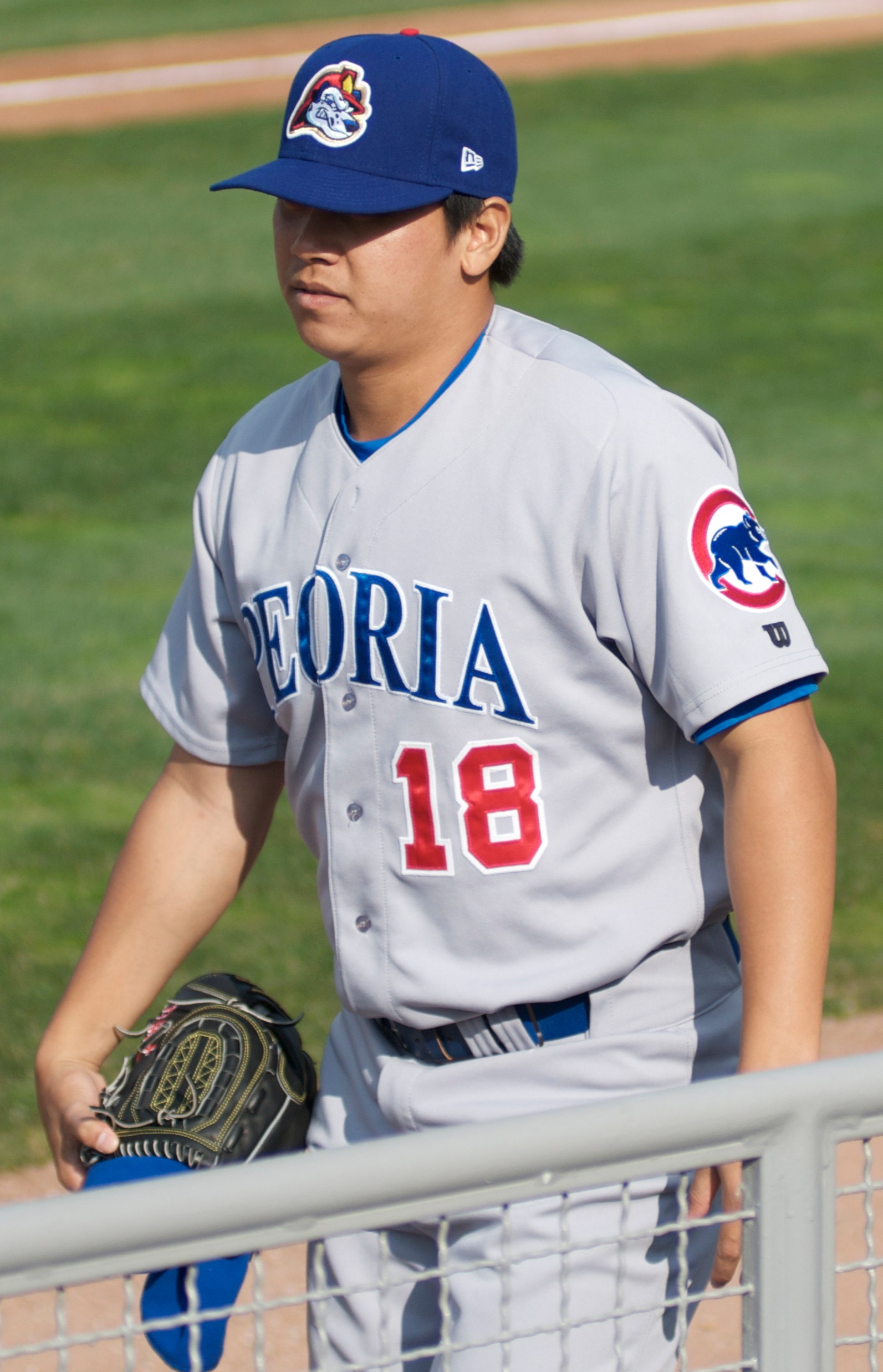
- Chen with Peoria Chiefs in 2008

Free agent
- Pitcher
- Born: 3 February 1986 (age 40); Hualien County, Taiwan
- Bats: Right Throws: Right

CPBL debut
- March 27, 2013, for the Brother Elephants

CPBL statistics (through 2024 season)
- Win–loss record: 54–55
- Earned run average: 3.62
- Strikeouts: 659
- Stats at Baseball Reference

Teams
- Brother Elephants / Chinatrust Brothers (2013–2017); Fubon Guardians (2018–2022); Rakuten Monkeys (2023–2024)

Chen Hung-wen (born 3 February 1986) is a Taiwanese professional baseball pitcher who is a free agent. He has previously played in the Chinese Professional Baseball League (CPBL) for the Chinatrust Brothers, Fubon Guardians, and Rakuten Monkeys.

== Career ==
=== Chicago Cubs ===
Chen signed with the Chicago Cubs as an international free agent in 2007, signing for a $200,000 bonus. His professional career began in 2008 when he led the Daytona Cubs to the Florida State League finals. In 2009, Chen pitched to a 4.48 ERA with 98 strikeouts for the Double-A Tennessee Smokies. In 2010 for the Smokies and the Triple-A Iowa Cubs, Chen pitched to a cumulative 3.98 ERA with 96 strikeouts over 32 appearances. Chen began the season with Tennessee and Iowa, and in June 2011 he was loaned to the Piratas de Campeche of the Mexican League. Chen pitched to a 1.82 ERA with 46 strikeouts in 19 games before being returned to the Cubs organization in late August. Frustrated with his lack of opportunities, Chen did not report to Spring Training in 2012, and the Cubs released him on March 10, 2013.

=== Brother Elephants/Chinatrust Brothers ===
Chen joined the Brother Elephants, later rebranded as the Chinatrust Brothers of the Chinese Professional Baseball League for the 2013 season. In August 2014, Chen was sidelined with inflammation in his shoulder tendon, and upon his return from the disabled list he was utilized as a reliever. On August 10, 2017, Chen returned to being a starting pitcher.

=== Fubon Guardians ===
Chen joined the Fubon Guardians after the 2017 season. In 2019, Chen pitched to a stellar 1.70 ERA with 51 strikeouts in 50 games. In the 2020 season, Chen pitched to a 4.77 ERA with 46 strikeouts in 53 games.

=== Rakuten Monkeys ===
On January 3, 2023, Chen signed with the Rakuten Monkeys of the Chinese Professional Baseball League.

== International career ==
He competed for the Taiwan national baseball team in the World Baseball Classic in 2009, 2013 and 2017.

He is currently the leader in pitching losses in World Baseball Classic history, with three losses accumulated over the 2009, 2013, and 2017 competitions.
