= Hirofumi Yamanaka =

Japanese baseball player

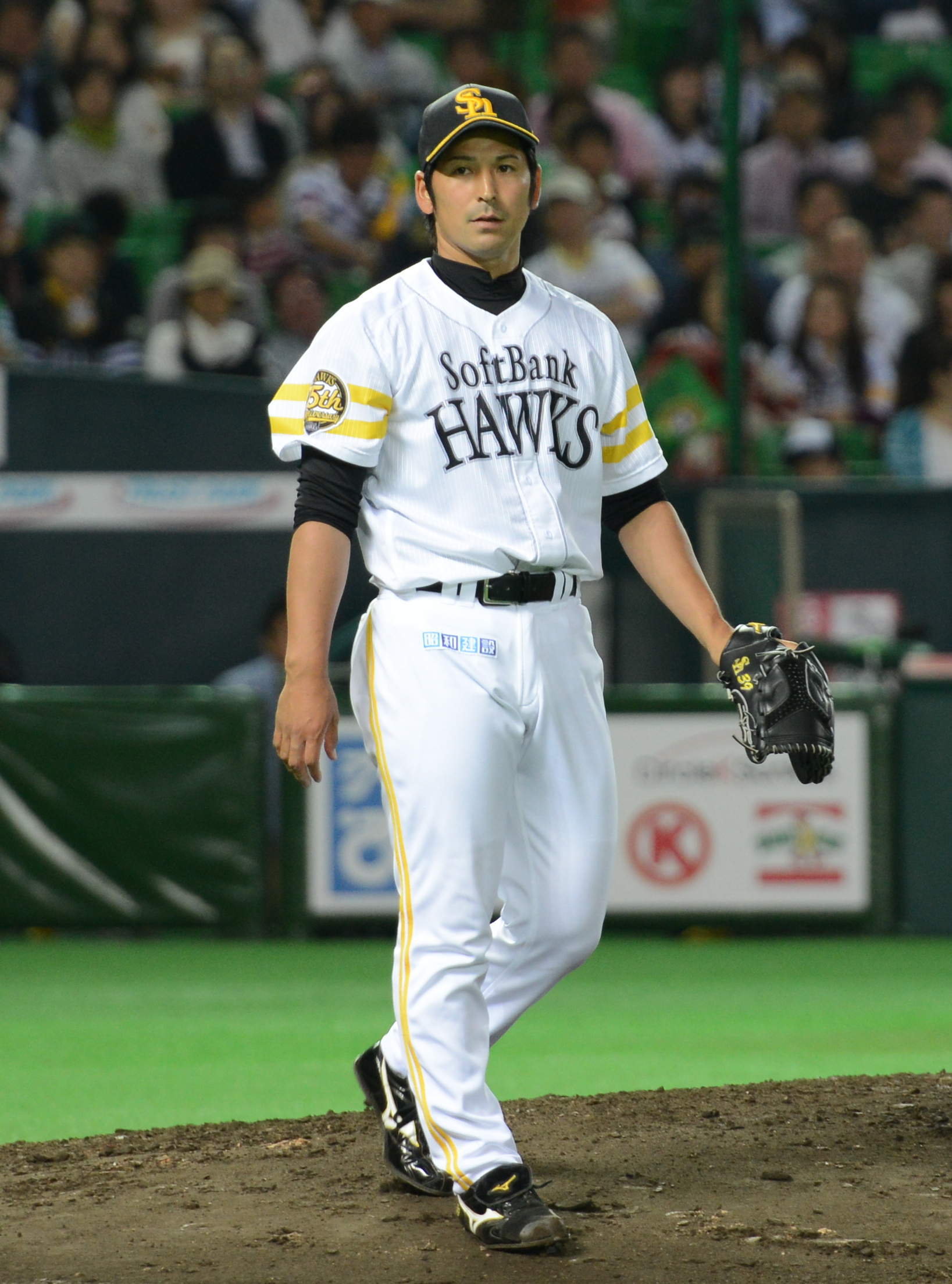
- Pitcher
- Born: September 9, 1985 (age 40); Amakusa, Kumamoto, Japan
- Bats: Right Throws: Right

debut
- April 1, 2014, for the Fukuoka SoftBank Hawks

NPB statistics (through 2020 season)
- Win–loss record: 17–26
- ERA: 4.33
- Strikeouts: 163
- Stats at Baseball Reference

Teams
- Fukuoka SoftBank Hawks (2013–2014); Tokyo Yakult Swallows (2014–2020)
Medals
Men's baseball
Representing Japan
Asian Games
Bronze medal – third place	2010 Guangzhou	Team

Hirofumi Yamanaka (山中 浩史, Yamanaka Hirofumi; born September 9, 1985) is a Japanese former baseball pitcher. He has played in Nippon Professional Baseball (NPB) for the Fukuoka SoftBank Hawks and Tokyo Yakult Swallows.

On November 2, 2020, Yamanaka announced his retirement.
