= Prices Information Cup =

The Prices Information Cup was a Korean Go competition from 2005 to 2014.

== Outline ==
Only players above 6 dan could participate. The time format was hayago. The winner's purse was 20,000,000 Won (~US$21,000).

== Past winners ==
Year	Winner	Score	Runner-up
2005	Pak Yeong-hun	2–0	Lee Chang-ho
2006	Lee Sedol	2–0	Choi Wonyong
2007	Lee Sedol	2–1	Lee Younggu
2008	Hong Sungji	2–1	Lee Sedol
2009	Kim Jiseok	2–0	Lee Chang-ho
2010	Lee Sedol	2–0	Lee Chang-ho
2011	Lee Younggu	2–1	Yun Junsang
2012	An Sungjoon	2–0	Kim Jiseok
2013	Park Junghwan	2–1	Lee Younggu
2014	Na Hyun	2–0	Park Changmyeong
