= Muhammad Asif (baseball) =

Pakistani baseball player (born 1986)

Muhammad Asif (born 8 May 1986) is a Pakistani baseball pitcher.

== Career ==
=== 2010 ===
Asif was part of the Pakistan national team at the 2010 Asian Games in Guangzhou, China.

=== 2017 ===
Asif also played for Pakistan in the qualifying round of the 2017 World Baseball Classic.
