= Lee Young-gu =

South Korean Go player

Lee Younggu
Personal information
- Native name: 이영구 (Korean); 李映九 (Korean)
- Full name: Lee Younggu
- Born: 23 August 1987 (age 38) South Korea

Sport
- Turned pro: 2001
- Teacher: Kweon Kab-yong
- Rank: 9 dan
- Affiliation: Hanguk Kiwon

Lee Younggu (born 23 August 1987) is a Korean professional Go player.

An Younggil describes Younggu's style as very normal with few weak spots.

== Promotion record ==
| Rank | Year | Notes |
|---|---|---|
| 1 dan | 2001 | |
| 2 dan | 2002 | |
| 3 dan | 2003 | |
| 4 dan | 2005 | |
| 5 dan | 2006 | |
| 6 dan | 2006 | |
| 7 dan | 2008 | |
| 8 dan | 2010 | |
| 9 dan | 2011 | |

== Career record ==
- 2006: 52 wins, 25 losses
- 2007: 70 wins, 33 losses
- 2008: 40 wins, 20 losses
- 2009: 32 wins, 20 losses
- 2010: 36 wins, 16 losses
- 2011: 27 wins, 8 losses

== Titles and runners-up ==
Domestic
| Title | Wins | Runners-up |
|---|---|---|
| Prices Information Cup | 1 (2011) | 1 (2007) |
| Wangwi | | 1 (2006) |
| BC Card Cup | | 2 (2003, 2004) |
| SK Gas Cup | | 1 (2006) |
| Osram Cup | | 1 (2005) |
| New Pro King | | 2 (2003, 2004) |
| Total | 1 | 8 |

=== Korean Baduk League ===
| Season | Team | Place | Record |
|---|---|---|---|
| 2007 | Team Yeongnam Ilbo (Captain) | 1st place | 8–5 |
| 2008 | Team Hangame (Captain) | 7th place | 8–6 |
| 2009 | Team Hangame | Runners-up | 12–5 |
| 2010 | Team Hangame | Runners-up | 13–4 |
| 2011 | Team Hangame (Captain) | TBD | 1–2 |
