= Lin Kun-sheng =

Taiwanese baseball player

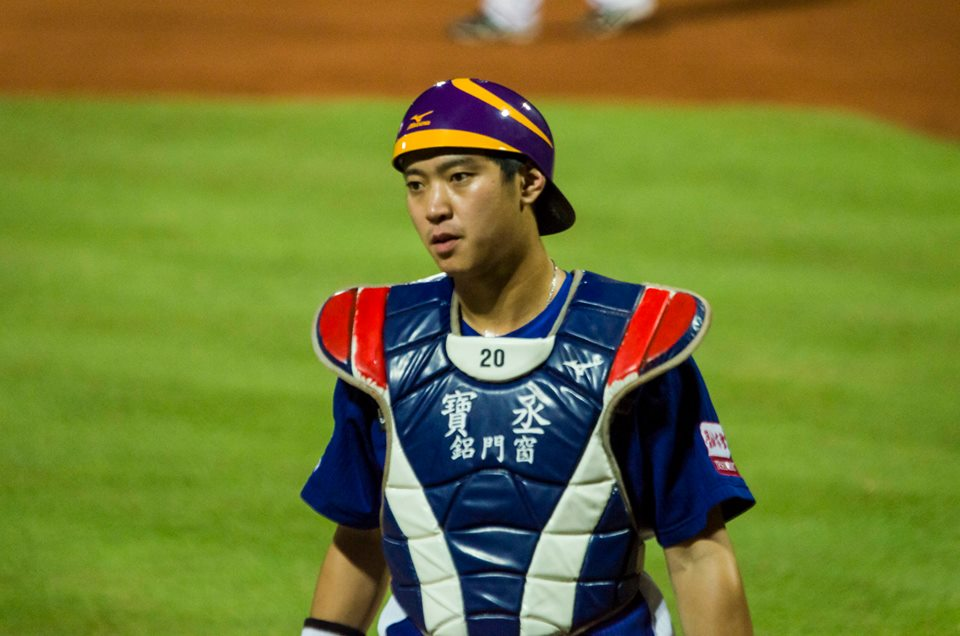

Rakuten Monkeys – No. 71
- Catcher / Coach
- Born: 8 March 1987 (age 39); Taitung County, Taiwan
- Bats: Right Throws: Right
- Stats at Baseball Reference

Lin Kun-sheng (born 8 March 1987) is a Taiwanese baseball catcher who plays with the Fubon Guardians in the Chinese Professional Baseball League.

He represented Taiwan at the 2003 World Youth Championships, 2007 Baseball World Cup, 2008 Haarlem Baseball Week, 2008 World University Baseball Championship, 2009 World Port Tournament, 2009 World Baseball Classic and 2017 World Baseball Classic.
