= Yang Yao-hsun =

Taiwanese baseball player (born 1983)

Yao-Hsun Yang
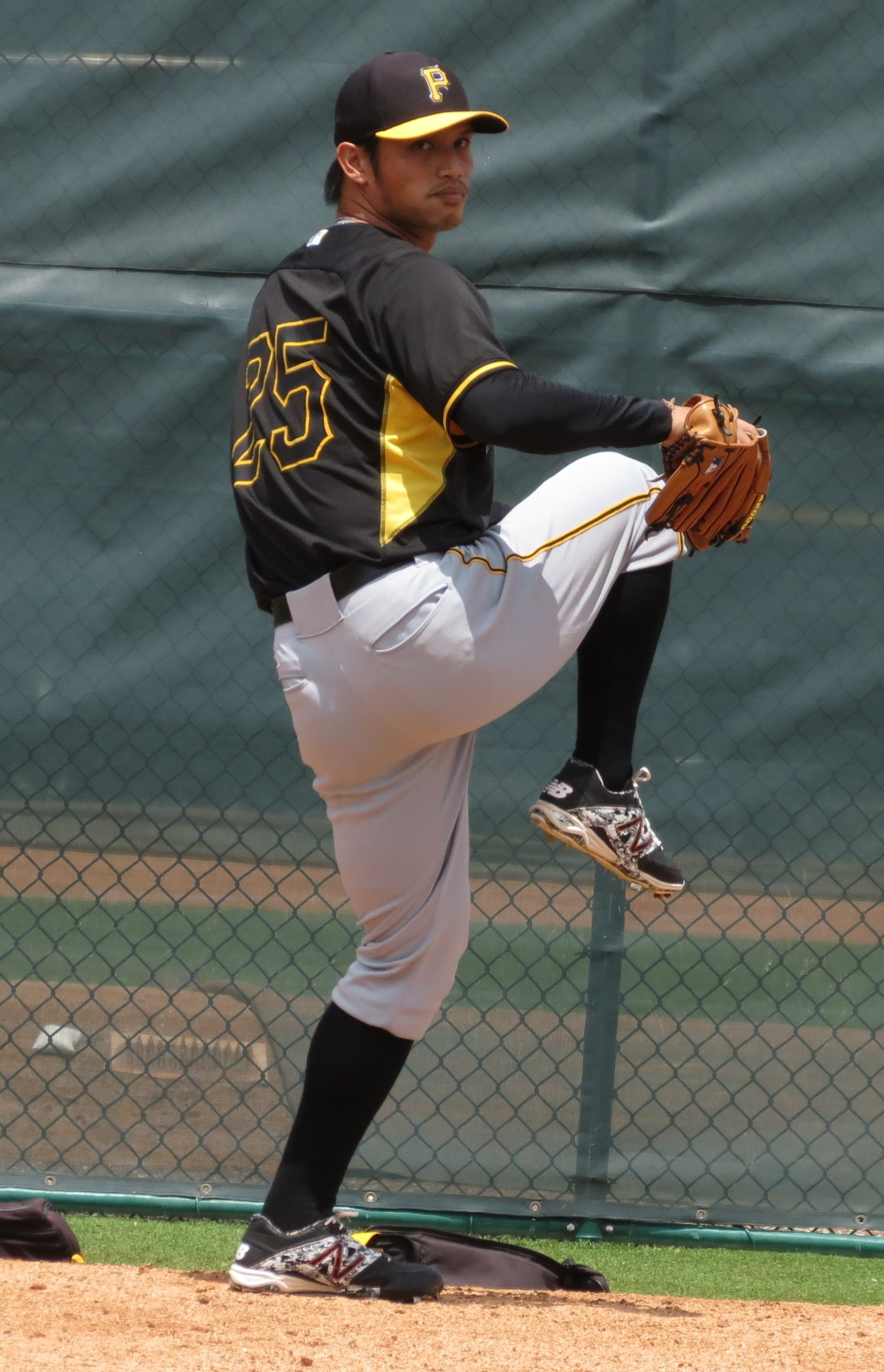
- Yao-Hsun Yang pitching for the Pittsburgh Pirates
- Pitcher / Outfielder
- Born: 22 January 1983 (age 43); Taitung City, Taiwan
- Batted: Left Threw: Left

Professional debut
- NPB: May 17, 2006, for the Fukuoka SoftBank Hawks
- CPBL: September 2, 2015, for the Lamigo Monkeys

Last appearance
- NPB: October 6, 2012, for the Fukuoka SoftBank Hawks
- CPBL: July 19, 2022, for the Fubon Guardians

NPB statistics
- Win–loss record: 5–5
- Earned run average: 3.08
- Strikeouts: 87

CPBL statistics
- Batting average: .300
- Home runs: 37
- Runs batted in: 151
- Stats at Baseball Reference

Teams
- Fukuoka SoftBank Hawks (2006–2013); Lamigo Monkeys/Rakuten Monkeys (2015–(2021); Fubon Guardians (2022)

Career highlights and awards
- 4x Taiwan Series champion (2015, 2017-2019)
Medals
Representing Chinese Taipei
Men's baseball
Intercontinental Cup
Bronze medal – third place	2006 Taichung	Team
Asian Games
Silver medal – second place	2010 Guangzhou	Team
Asian Baseball Championship
Silver medal – second place	2005 Miyazaki	Team

Yang Yao-hsun (Chinese: 陽耀勳; pinyin: Yāng Yàoxūn; born 22 January 1983 in Taitung City, Taiwan) is a former Taiwanese professional baseball pitcher and outfielder. He played in Nippon Professional Baseball (NPB) as a pitcher for the Fukuoka SoftBank Hawks. He played in the Chinese Professional Baseball League (CPBL) as an outfielder for the Lamigo Monkeys and Fubon Guardians.

== Career ==
Yang played for the Fukuoka SoftBank Hawks of Nippon Professional Baseball from 2006 until 2013 before expressing his desire to sign in America because of his MLB dream.

On 13 February 2014 he signed a minor league deal with an invite to Spring training with the Pittsburgh Pirates. He was assigned to the Altoona Curve to begin the season but was released on July 10, 2014.

He signed with the Lamigo Monkeys (now Rakuten Monkeys) of CPBL in 2015 and played for the club through 2021. For the 2022 season he played for the Fubon Guardians, entering play in only 13 games. As of May 2023 he had not played in the 2023 CPBL season.

== International career ==
Yang competed for Chinese Taipei in the 2005 Asian Baseball Championship, 2006 World Baseball Classic, 2006 Intercontinental Cup, 2010 Asian Games, 2013 World Baseball Classic Qualification and 2013 World Baseball Classic.

== Pitching style ==
Yang is a 5 ft 10 in, 190 lb left-handed pitcher. he throws a low 90s fastball, along with a slider, curveball, and a splitter. He mostly uses his fastball-slider combination in games.

== Personal life ==
Yang is the brother of fellow professional baseball player Yang Dai-Kang. He is a member of the Amis tribe and descendant of the famous warrior Kolas Mahengheng.

== See also ==
- Baseball in Taiwan
- List of baseball players from Taiwan
