= Mongolia national baseball team =

National baseball team of Mongolia

Information
- Country: Mongolia
- Federation: Mongolia Baseball Federation
- Confederation: BFA
- Manager: vacant

WBSC ranking
- Current: NR (26 March 2026)

Asian Games
- Appearances: 3

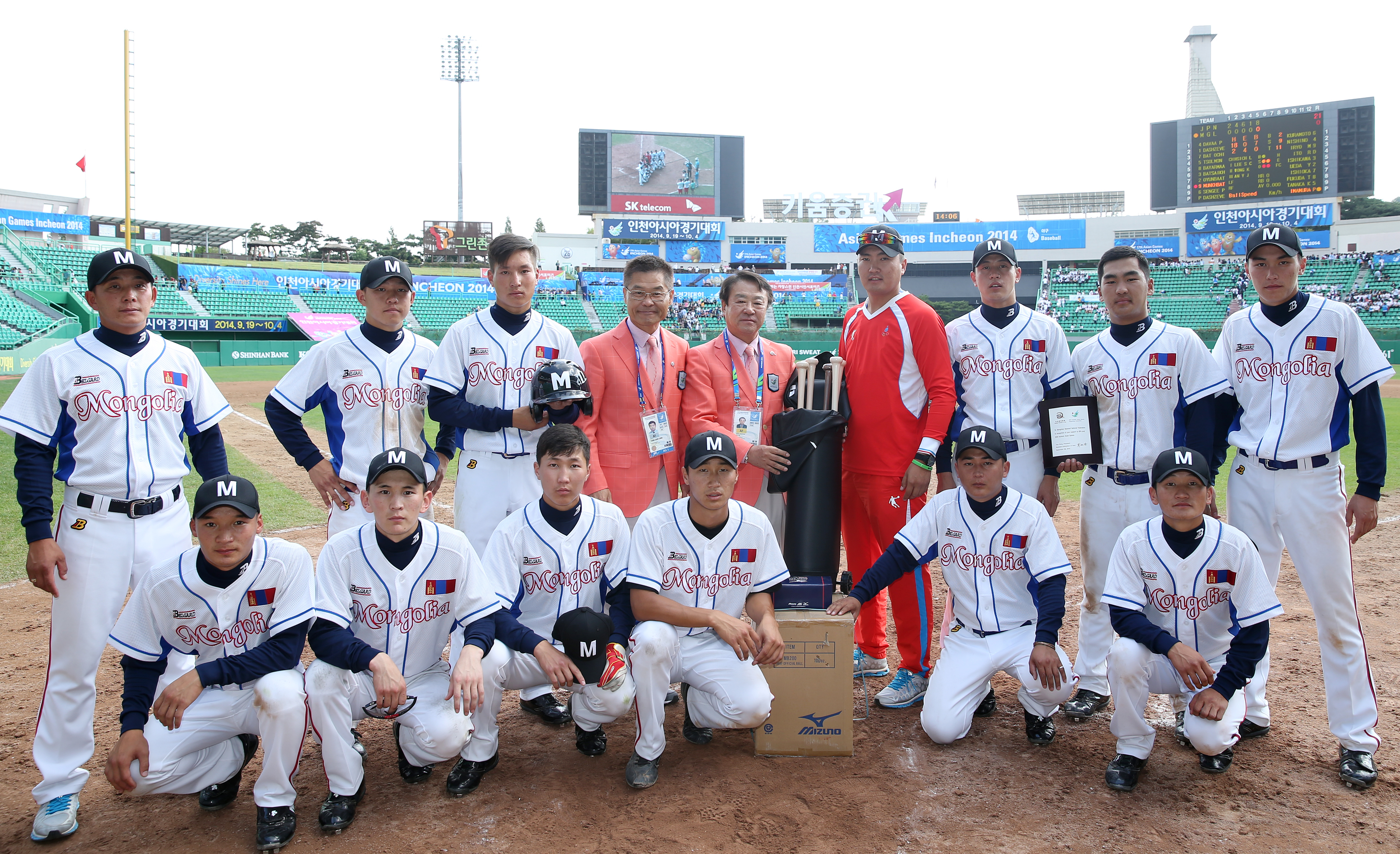
Mongolia at Munhak Baseball Stadium in Incheon during the 2014 Asian Games

The Mongolia national baseball team is the national baseball team of Mongolia. The team represents Mongolia in international competitions.

The team has represented Mongolia at the 1994, 2010 and 2014 Asian Games; however, they have only scored three runs. In fact, because of the application of the mercy rule, they have been unable to complete a single nine-inning game. Over three games at the 2014 Asian Games, the Mongolia national baseball team scored no runs, recorded two hits (while being no-hit by both China and Pakistan), and registered fifteen errors.

== Competition record ==
=== Asian Games ===
- 1994 : 6th
- 1998 : did not participate
- 2002 : did not participate
- 2006 : did not participate
- 2010 : 7th
- 2014 : 7th
- 2018 : did not participate
- 2022 : did not participate
