= Tomoyuki Sasaki =

Japanese sailor (born 1963)

Personal information
- Nationality: Japanese
- Born: 5 October 1963 (age 61)

Sport
- Sport: Sailing

Tomoyuki Sasaki (佐々木 共之, Sasaki Tomoyuki; born 5 October 1963) is a Japanese sailor. He competed at the 1996 Summer Olympics and the 2000 Summer Olympics.
