= Kenta Hirose =

Japanese footballer

Kenta Hirose 広瀬 健太
Personal information
- Full name: Kenta Hirose
- Date of birth: 26 June 1992 (age 34)
- Place of birth: Kawaguchi, Saitama, Japan
- Height: 1.78 m (5 ft 10 in)
- Position: Centre back

Team information
- Current team: Kagoshima United
- Number: 4

Youth career
- 2005–2010: Urawa Red Diamonds

College career
Years	Team	Apps	(Gls)
2011–2014	Nippon Sport Science University		

Senior career*
Years	Team	Apps	(Gls)
2015–2017	Shonan Bellmare	1	(0)
2016–2017	→ Tochigi SC (loan)	54	(6)
2018–2019	Albirex Niigata	30	(2)
2020–2022	Nagano Parceiro	45	(3)
2022–	Kagoshima United	89	(7)
- * Club domestic league appearances and goals as of 18 August 2026

Kenta Hirose (広瀬 健太, Hirose Kenta; born 26 June 1992) is a Japanese footballer who plays as a centre-back and captain. He currently play for Kagoshima United.

== Career ==
Hirose made his debut for Kagoshima against Iwaki FC on 13 March 2022, playing the full 90 minutes.

== Career statistics ==
=== Club ===
As of the start from 2025 season.

Appearances and goals by club, season and competition
Club	Season	League			Emperor's Cup		League Cup		Total	
Club	Season	Division	Apps	Goals	Apps	Goals	Apps	Goals	Apps	Goals
Shonan Bellmare	2015	J1 League	1	0	0	0	1	0	2	0
Tochigi SC	2016	J3 League	28	3	–				28	3
Tochigi SC	2017	J3 League	26	3	–				26	3
Albirex Niigata	2018	J2 League	24	2	2	0	2	0	28	2
Albirex Niigata	2019	J2 League	6	0	1	0	0	0	7	0
Nagano Parceiro	2020	J3 League	23	2	–				23	2
Nagano Parceiro	2021	J3 League	22	1	1	0	–		23	1
Kagoshima United	2022	J3 League	30	3	1	0	–		31	3
Kagoshima United	2023	J3 League	26	2	1	0	–		27	2
Kagoshima United	2024	J2 League	9	0	1	0	2	0	12	0
Kagoshima United	2025	J3 League	0	0	0	0	0	0	0	0
Career total			186	16	6	0	3	0	195	16
