= Hayata Ito =

Japanese baseball player (born 1989)

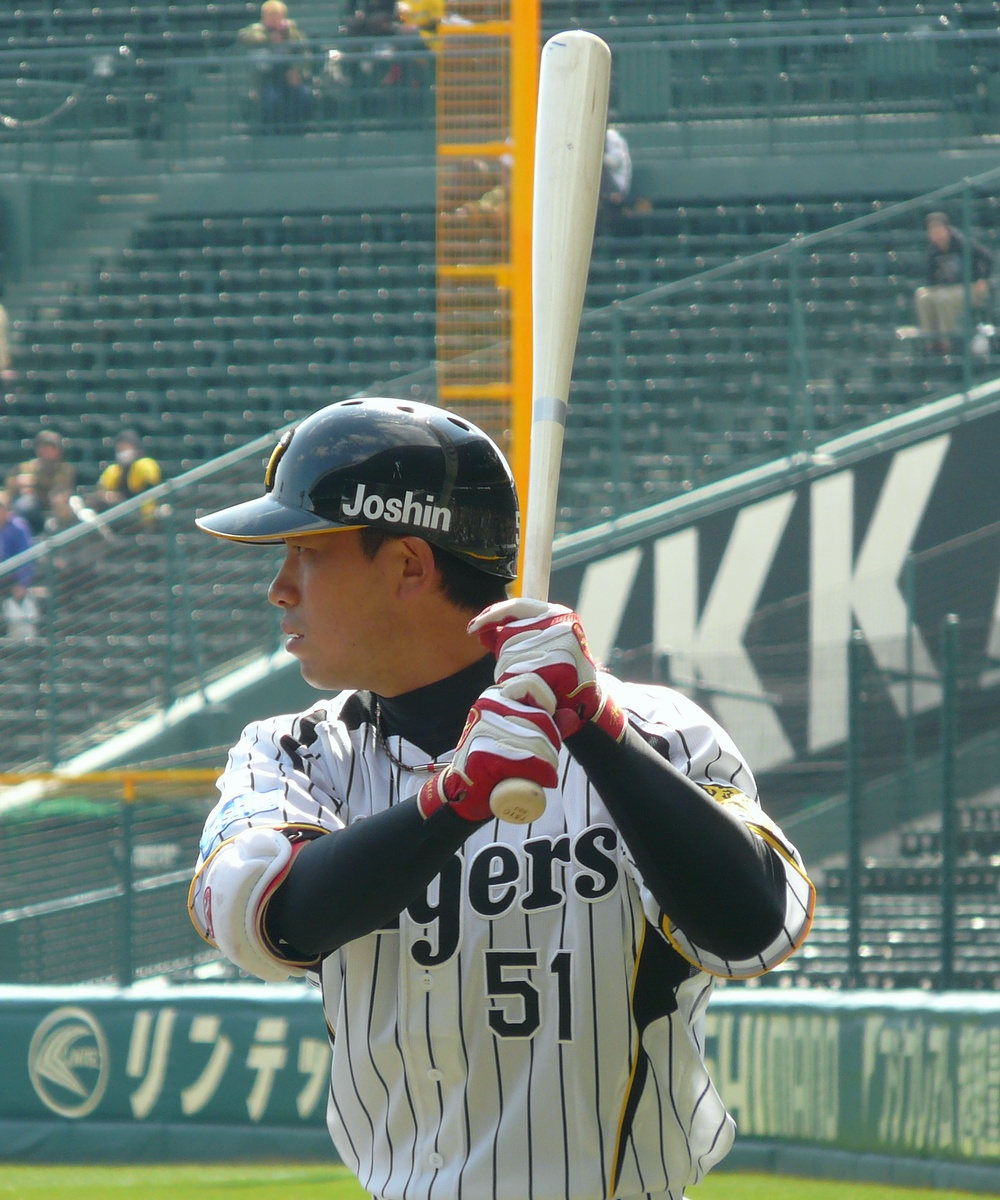

Oisix Niigata Albirex – No. 76
- Outfielder
- Born: May 8, 1989 (age 37); Seto, Aichi, Japan
- Bats: Left Throws: Right

NPB debut
- March 30, 2012, for the Hanshin Tigers

NPB statistics (through 2020 season)
- Batting average: .240
- Home Runs: 10
- RBI: 59
- Stats at Baseball Reference

Teams
- Hanshin Tigers (2012–2020)
Medals
Men's baseball
Representing Japan
Asian Games
Bronze medal – third place	2010 Jakarta	Team

Hayata Ito (伊藤 隼太, Itō Hayata; born May 8, 1989) is a Japanese professional baseball outfielder. He has played in Nippon Professional Baseball (NPB) for the Hanshin Tigers.

== Career ==
Hanshin Tigers selected Ito with the first selection in the 2011 NPB draft.

On March 30, 2012, Ito made his NPB debut.

On December 2, 2020, he became a free agent.
