= Lin Chih-han =

Taiwanese Go player (born 1980)

Personal information
- Full name: Lin Chih-han
- Born: 14 November 1980 (age 45) Taiwan

Sport
- Rank: 9 dan
- Affiliation: Taiwan Qiyuan

Lin Chih-han (Chinese: 林至涵; pinyin: Lín Zhìhán; born 14 November 1980) is a Taiwanese professional Go player.

== Promotion record ==
Rank	Year	Notes
1 dan	2001	
2 dan	2001	
3 dan	2002	
4 dan	2003	
5 dan	2003	
6 dan	2004	
7 dan	2004	
8 dan	2007	
9 dan	2009	

== Career record ==
- 2006: 42 wins, 19 losses
- 2007: 35 wins, 18 losses
- 2008: 65 wins, 27 losses
- 2009: 33 wins, 18 losses
- 2010: 47 wins, 22 losses

== Titles and runners-up ==
Domestic
Title	Wins	Runners-up
Qiwang		1 (2010)
Tianyuan	2 (2008, 2009)	1 (2010)
Wangzuo		1 (2008)
Guoshou	3 (2008–2010)	
Haifong Cup	1 (2009)	
Qisheng	1 (2008)	
Zhonghuan Cup		1 (2008)
Aixin Cup		1 (2007)
Donggang Cup		2 (2007, 2008)
Total	7	7

Continental
Title	Wins	Runners-up
Japan-Taiwan Jingying		1 (2011)
Total	0	1
