= Chen Shih-yuan =

Taiwanese Go player

Chen Shiyuan
Personal information
- Native name: 陳詩淵 (Chinese)
- Full name: Chen Shiyuan
- Born: 1985 (age 40–41) Taiwan

Sport
- Teacher: Kwon Kab-Ryong
- Rank: 9 dan
- Affiliation: Taiwan Qiyuan

Chen Shiyuan (Chinese: 陳詩淵; pinyin: Chén Shīyuān; born 1985) is a Taiwanese professional Go player.

== Biography ==
He is a 9 dan professional in Taiwan. In 2000, he went to South Korea and studied under Kwon Kab-Ryong. He spent 5 years in Korea, before moving back to Taiwan in 2005.

== Promotion record ==
Rank	Year	Notes
1 dan		
2 dan	2001	
3 dan	2005	
4 dan		
5 dan		
6 dan		
7 dan	2007	
8 dan	2009	
9 dan	2011	

== Career record ==
- 2006: 43 wins, 20 losses
- 2007: 44 wins, 15 losses
- 2008: 40 wins, 21 losses
- 2009: 55 wins, 11 losses
- 2010: 46 wins, 15 losses
- 2011: 21 wins, 3 losses

== Titles and runners-up ==
Domestic
Title	Wins	Runners-up
Qiwang	2 (2009, 2010)	1 (2008)
Tianyuan	2 (2007, 2011)	2 (2008, 2009)
Wangzuo	3 (2008, 2009, 2010)	2 (2006, 2007)
Guoshou	2 (2006, 2007)	1 (2008)
Haifong Cup		1 (2009)
Qisheng	1 (2010)	1 (2008)
Zhonghuan Cup	3 (2005, 2008, 2011)	2 (2007, 2009)
Aixin Cup	1 (2009)	
Donggang Cup	3 (2005, 2007, 2009)	1 (2010)
CMC TV Cup	1 (2007)	
Total	18	11

Continental
Title	Wins	Runners-up
Japan-Taiwan Jingying	1 (2011)	1 (2009)
Total	1	1

- Total: 19 titles, 12 runners-up.
