= Lin Yi-hao =

Japanese baseball player

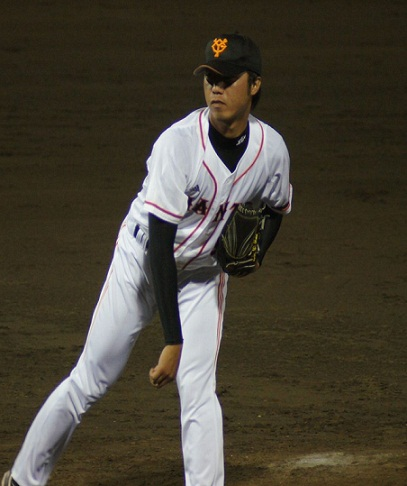
- Pitcher
- Born: January 2, 1991 (age 35); Taiwan
- Batted: Right Threw: Right

NPB debut
- August 7, 2010, for the Yomiuri Giants

Last NPB appearance
- August 31, 2010, for the Yomiuri Giants

NPB statistics
- Win–loss record: 0–0
- Earned run average: 12.60
- Strikeouts: 4

CBL statistics (through 2022)
- Win–loss record: 12–20
- Earned run average: 4.14
- Strikeouts: 284
- Stats at Baseball Reference

Teams
- Yomiuri Giants (2010); EDA Rhinos/Fubon Guardians (2014–2021); Wei Chuan Dragons (2022)

Career highlights and awards
- Taiwan Series champion (2016)

Lin Yi-hao (born January 2, 1991) is a professional baseball pitcher. He played for the Yomiuri Giants in Japan's Nippon Professional Baseball and in Taiwan for the Fubon Guardians and Wei Chuan Dragons of the Chinese Professional Baseball League (CPBL).

== Career ==
Lin began his career by signing with the Yomiuri Giants of Nippon Professional Baseball in 2008. He played for the club from 2010 to 2013 before joining the EDA Rhinos, later rebranded as the Fubon Guardians of the Chinese Professional Baseball League. Lin pitched with the Guardians in every season from 2014 to 2021.
