= Lü Jiangang =

Chinese baseball player

Lü Jiangang 吕 建刚

Tianjin Lions – No. 17
- Pitcher
- Born: February 19, 1979 (age 47); Tianjin, China
- Bats: Right Throws: Right

Teams
- Chunichi Dragons (1999 – 2002); Tianjin Lions (2003 – )

Lü Jiangang (simplified Chinese: 吕建刚; traditional Chinese: 呂建剛; pinyin: Lǚ Jiàngāng; born 19 February 1979) is a Chinese baseball player who was a member of Team China at the 2008 Summer Olympics. He was the winning pitcher against Chinese Taipei, that was the Chinese Team's only win from the Olympics. He also pitched for China at the 2009 World Baseball Classic. He beat Chinese Taipei again in this tournament.

== Sports career ==
- 1994 Tianjin Municipal Team;
- 1998 National Team;
- 1999-2002 Japan Chunichi Dragons Team;
- 2003–Present Tianjin Municipal Team

== Major performances ==
- 2001/2005 National Games - 1st;
- 2006-2007 National League - 1st;
- 1998/2002/2006 Asian Games - 4th;
- 2008 Olympic Games - 8th
