= Jiro Akiyama =

Japanese professional Go player

Personal information
- Native name: 秋山次郎 (Japanese)
- Full name: Jiro Akiyama
- Born: November 23, 1977 (age 48) Tokyo, Japan

Sport
- Turned pro: 1992
- Teacher: Yasuro Kikuchi
- Rank: 9 dan
- Affiliation: Nihon Ki-in

Jiro Akiyama
Medal record

Representing Japan

Asian Games
Bronze medal – third place	2010 Guangzhou	Men's Team

Jiro Akiyama (秋山 次郎, Akiyama Jirō; born November 23, 1977) is a Japanese professional Go player.

== Biography ==
Akiyama became a professional in 1992 at the age of 14. He was taught by Yasuro Kikuchi. In 1999, he was promoted to 7 dan. His biggest accomplishment came in 2002 when he was runner-up for the NEC Shun-Ei title to Shinji Takao. He currently resides in Tokyo, Japan.

== Promotion record ==
Rank	Year	Notes
1 dan	1992	
2 dan	1992	
3 dan	1993	
4 dan	1994	
5 dan	1996	
6 dan	1997	
7 dan	1999	
8 dan	2006	
9 dan	2012	

== Past runners-up ==
Title	Years Lost
Defunct	1
(Japan) NEC Shun-Ei	2002
