= Daiki Enokida =

Japanese baseball player

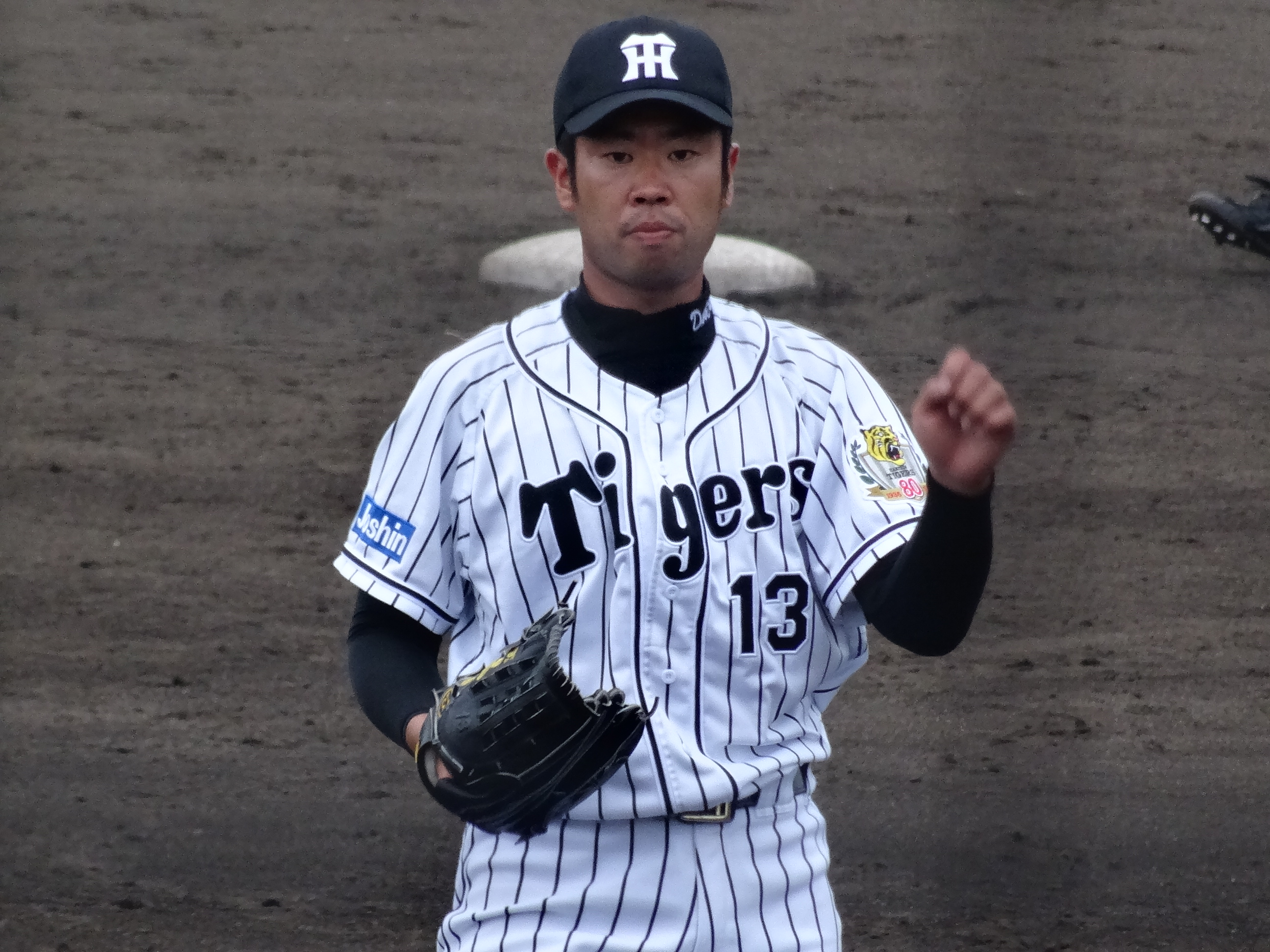
- Enokida pitching for the Hanshin Tigers farm team at Hanshin Naruohama Baseball Ground

Saitama Seibu Lions – No. 85
- Pitcher / Coach
- Born: August 7, 1986 (age 40); Ogawa, Saitama, Japan
- Batted: Left Threw: Left

NPB debut
- April 16, 2011, for the Hanshin Tigers

Last NPB appearance
- November 2, 2020, for the Saitama Seibu Lions

NPB statistics (through 2020 season)
- Win–loss record: 29-25
- ERA: 4.16
- Strikeouts: 414
- Holds: 60
- Saves: 3
- Stats at Baseball Reference

Teams
- As player: Hanshin Tigers (2011–2018); Saitama Seibu Lions (2018–2021); As coach: Saitama Seibu Lions (2024-present)

Career highlights and awards
- 1× NPB All-Star (2011)

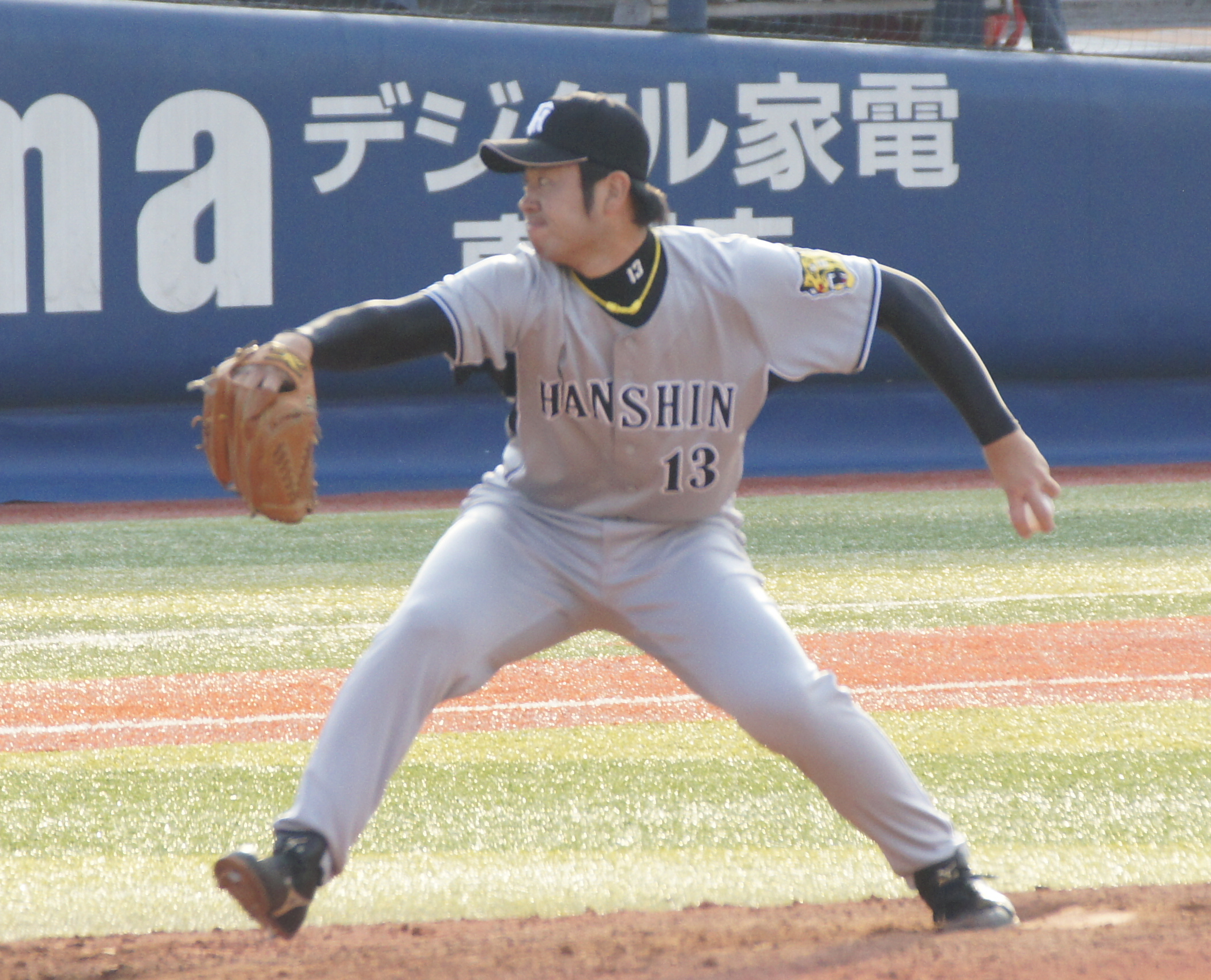
Enokida pitching for the Hanshin Tigers at Yokohama Stadium.

Daiki Enokida (榎田 大樹, Enokida Daiki; born August 7, 1986) is a Japanese professional baseball pitcher for the Saitama Seibu Lions in Japan's Nippon Professional Baseball. He was pitching for the Hanshin Tigers against the Yakult Swallows in 2013, when Wladimir Balentien broke Japan's single-season home run record.
