= Lin Ying-chieh =

Taiwanese baseball player (born 1981)

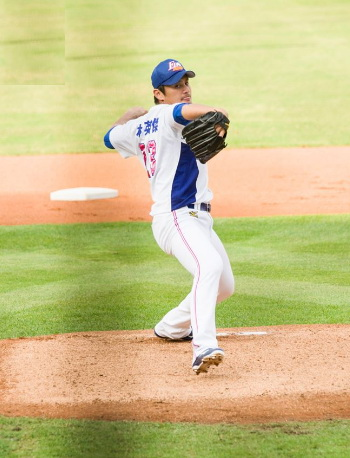

Rakuten Monkeys – No. 43
- Pitcher / Coach
- Born: May 1, 1981 (age 44); Taitung County, Taiwan
- Bats: Left Throws: Left

Professional debut
- TML: September 12, 1998, for the Kaoping Fala
- CPBL: March 4, 2004, for the Macoto Cobras
- NPB: March 26, 2006, for the Tohoku Rakuten Golden Eagles

TML statistics
- Win–loss record: 19 - 11
- Earned run average: 3.56
- Strikeouts: 230

CPBL statistics
- Win–loss record: 59 - 63
- Earned run average: 3.31
- Strikeouts: 792
- Stats at Baseball Reference

Teams
- Kaoping Fala (1999–2001); Macoto Cobras (2004–2005); Tohoku Rakuten Golden Eagles (2006–2008); Sinon Bulls / EDA Rhinos (2009–2014); CTBC Brothers (2015–2016); Lamigo Monkeys (2017)

Career highlights and awards
- As player: Taiwan Series champion (2017); 7x CPBL All-Star (2004, 2005, 2009–2013); As coach: Taiwan Series champion (2025)

Lin Ying-chieh (Chinese: 林英傑; pinyin: Lín Yīngjié; born 1 May 1981) is a Taiwanese former professional baseball pitcher and current coach. A seven-time All-Star in Taiwan, Lin has played in the Taiwan Major League (TML), Chinese Professional Baseball League (CPBL), and Nippon Professional Baseball (NPB). He is currently the bullpen coach for the Rakuten Monkeys.

Lin was signed by the Kaoping Fala of the TML in 1999. In the CPBL, Lin played for the Macoto Cobras, Sinon Bulls / EDA Rhinos, CTBC Brothers, and Lamigo Monkeys; in NPB, he played for the Tohoku Rakuten Golden Eagles.

Lin represented Taiwan in the 2004 Summer Olympics and 2006 World Baseball Classic.
