= Atsushi Kobayashi =

Japanese baseball player

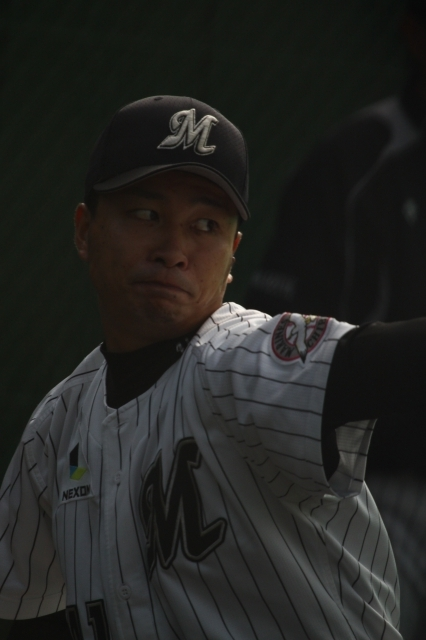
- Kobayashi with the Chiba Lotte Marines
- Pitcher
- Born: February 24, 1986 (age 40); Shimada, Shizuoka
- Bats: Right Throws: Right

NPB debut
- 2011, for the Chiba Lotte Marines

NPB statistics (through 2011)
- Win–loss record: 1–5
- ERA: 5.80
- Strikeouts: 22
- Stats at Baseball Reference

Teams
- Chiba Lotte Marines (2011)

Atsushi Kobayashi (小林 敦, born February 24, 1986) is a Japanese former professional baseball pitcher in Nippon Professional Baseball. He played for the Chiba Lotte Marines in 2011.
