= Kota Suda =

Japanese baseball player

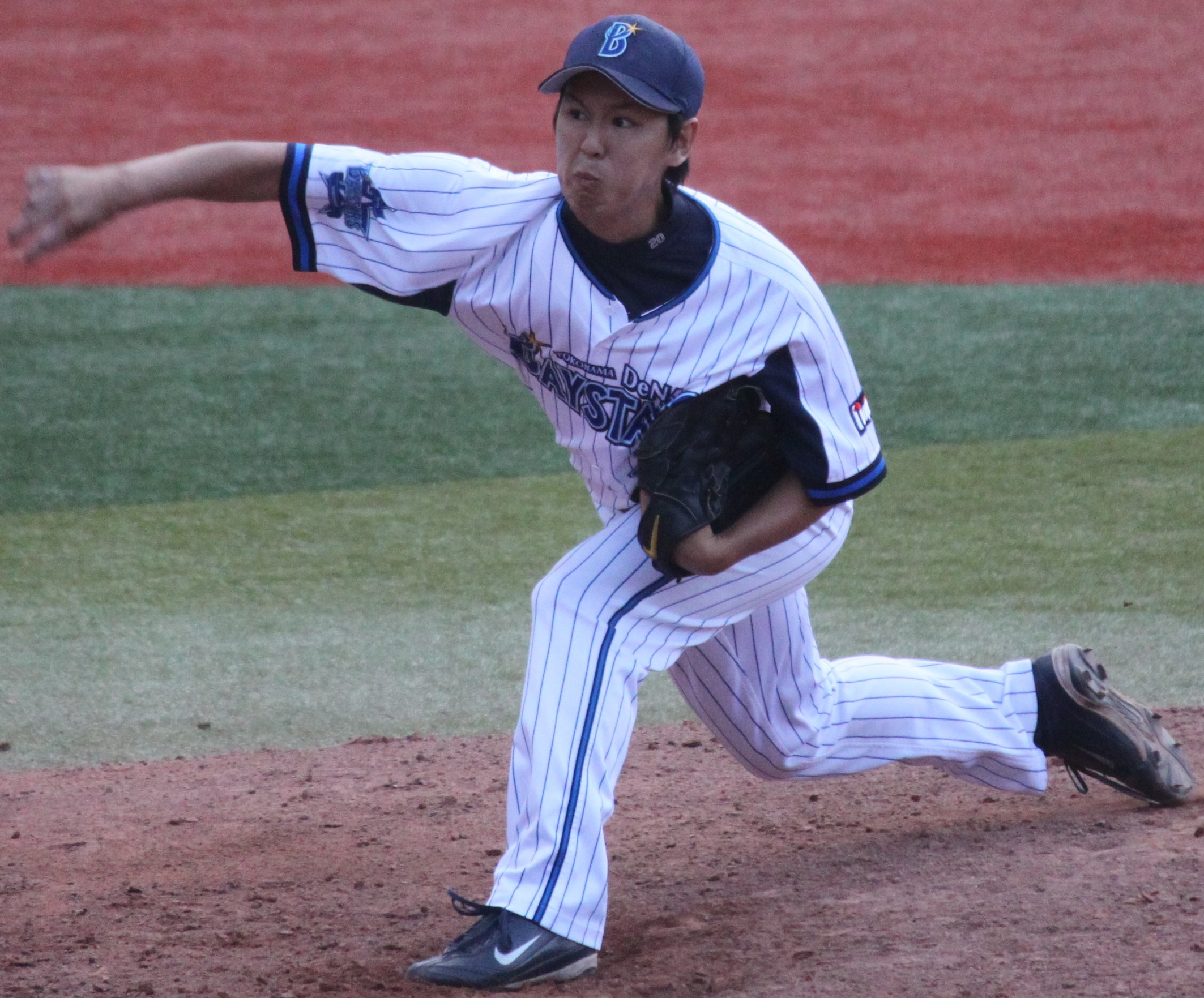
- Suda with the Yokohama DeNA BayStars
- Pitcher
- Born: July 31, 1986 (age 39); Ishioka, Ibaraki, Japan
- Bats: Right Throws: Right

debut
- April 22, 2011, for the Yokohama BayStars

Career statistics (through 2018)
- Win–loss record: 16–19
- Earned run average: 4.81
- Strikeouts: 217
- Stats at Baseball Reference

Teams
- Yokohama BayStars/Yokohama DeNA BayStars (2011–2018)

Kota Suda (須田 幸太, Suda Kota; born July 31, 1986) is a former Japanese professional baseball player. He played pitcher for the Yokohama DeNA BayStars.
