= China at the 2013 Asian Indoor and Martial Arts Games =

- IOC code: CHN
- NOC: Chinese Olympic Committee

in Incheon 29 June–6 July
- Competitors: 102 in 9 sports
- Medals Ranked 1st: Gold 29 Silver 13 Bronze 10 Total 52

Asian Indoor and Martial Arts Games appearances
- 2005; 2007; 2009; 2013; 2017; 2021; 2026

The People's Republic of China competed at the 2013 Asian Indoor and Martial Arts Games held in Incheon, South Korea from June 26 to July 6, 2013. The nation placed first in the overall rankings.

== Medalists ==
Medal	Name	Sport	Event
Gold	Yu Yangyi	Chess	Men's individual standard
Gold	Hou Yifan	Chess	Women's individual standard
Gold	Yu Yangyi; Guo Qi; Hou Yifan; Xiu Deshun; Yu Yangyi; Zhao Xue	Chess	Mixed team rapid
Gold	Cao Yupeng	Cue sports	Men's snooker singles
Gold	Ding Junhui; Liang Wenbo; Tian Pengfei	Cue sports	Men's snooker team
Gold	Xiao Guodong	Cue sports	Men's Six-red snooker singles
Gold	Zhao Peng; Wang Qi	Dancesport	Standard Five dances
Gold	Zhang Zhanhua; Zhang Ruonan	Dancesport	Slow foxtrot
Gold	Zhao Peng; Wang Qi	Dancesport	Tango
Gold	Zhang Zhanhua; Zhang Ruonan	Dancesport	Waltz
Gold	Hou Yao; Zhuang Ting	Dancesport	Latin Five dances
Gold	Hou Yao; Zhuang Ting	Dancesport	Cha-cha-cha
Gold	Tang Weixing	Go	Men's individual
Gold	Gao Xing; Wang Shuang; Yu Zhiying; Zhang Peipei	Go	Women's team
Gold	Peng Liyao; Gao Xing	Go	Mixed pair
Gold	Mao Feilian	Short course swimming	Men's 200 m freestyle
Gold	Sun Xiaolei	Short course swimming	Men's 50 m backstroke
Gold	Sun Xiaolei	Short course swimming	Men's 100 m individual medley
Gold	Mao Feilian	Short course swimming	Men's 200 m individual medley
Gold	Liu Junwu; Mao Feilian; Sun Xiaolei; Zhang Zhongchao	Short course swimming	Men's 4 × 50 m freestyle relay
Gold	Liu Junwu; Mao Feilian; Xu Zhijie; Zhang Zhongchao	Short course swimming	Men's 4 × 100 m freestyle relay
Gold	Sun Xiaolei; Xue Jiajia; Xu Zhijie; Liu Junwu	Short course swimming	Men's 4 × 50 m medley relay
Gold	Sun Xiaolei; Mao Feilian; Xu Zhijie; Zhang Zhongchao	Short course swimming	Men's 4 × 100 m medley relay
Gold	Wang Fei	Short course swimming	Women's 200 m freestyle
Gold	Zhou Yanxin	Short course swimming	Women's 50 m backstroke
Gold	Zhou Yanxin	Short course swimming	Women's 100 m backstroke
Gold	Zhou Yanxin	Short course swimming	Women's 100 m individual medley
Gold	Wang Siqi; Liu Siwen; Gong Jie; Wang Fei; Ren Luomeng	Short course swimming	Women's 4 × 100 m freestyle relay
Gold	Zhou Yanxin; Liu Siwen; Gong Jie; Wang Fei	Short course swimming	Women's 4 × 100 m medley relay
Silver	Chen Dongdong	Bowling	Women's singles
Silver	Zhao Xue	Chess	Women's individual standard
Silver	Yu Yangyi; Guo Qi; Hou Yifan; Xiu Deshun; Yu Yangyi; Zhao Xue	Chess	Mixed team blitz
Silver	Ding Junhui	Cue sports	Men's snooker singles
Silver	Chen Wei	Esports	FIFA 13
Silver	Feng Zhuojun; Gao Xuecheng; Ji Xing; Ming Kai; Wei Handong; Yu Jingxi	Esports	League of Legends
Silver	Mi Yuting; Peng Liyao; Tan Xiao; Tang Weixing	Go	Men's team
Silver	Zhang Jinglei	Muaythai	Men's light middleweight
Silver	Liu Junwu	Short course swimming	Men's 100 m freestyle
Silver	Sun Xiaolei	Short course swimming	Men's 100 m backstroke
Silver	Zhou Yanxin	Short course swimming	Women's 200 m individual medley
Silver	Wang Siqi; Zhou Yanxin; Chen Xiaojun; Wang Fei; Fan Rong; Liu Siwen	Short course swimming	Women's 4 × 50 m freestyle relay
Silver	Zhou Yanxin; Liu Siwen; Gong Jie; Wang Fei	Short course swimming	Women's 4 × 50 m medley relay
Bronze	Ding Liren	Chess	Men's individual standard
Bronze	Li Hewen	Cue sports	Men's Nine-ball singles
Bronze	Li Junfeng	Esports	StarCraft II: Heart of the Swarm
Bronze	Tan Xiao	Go	Men's individual
Bronze	Mi Yuting; Yu Zhiying	Go	Mixed pair
Bronze	Li Gang	Muaythai	Men's bantamweight
Bronze	Guo Dongwang	Muaythai	Men's welterweight
Bronze	Yuan Xiaoyan	Muaythai	Women's flyweight
Bronze	Yang Yang	Muaythai	Women's bantamweight
Bronze	Zhang Zhongchao	Short course swimming	Men's 200 m freestyle

== Bowling ==
China competed in bowling.

Athlete	Event	Preliminary round		Quarterfinal	Semifinal	Gold medal match	
Athlete	Event	Score	Rank	Opposition Result	Opposition Result	Opposition Result	Rank
Qi Wankang	Men's singles	1239	26	Did not advance			
Zhang Peng	Men's singles	1171	44	Did not advance			
Chen Wenchang	Men's singles	1155	51	Did not advance			
Cai Xiaotian	Men's singles	1083	64	Did not advance			
Cai Xiaotian; Chen Wenchang	Men's doubles	2338	15	Did not advance			
Zhang Peng; Qi Wankang	Men's doubles	2173	28	Did not advance			
Cai Xiaotian; Chen Wenchang; Zhang Peng; Qi Wankang	Men's team of 4	4812	9	Did not advance			
Chen Dongdong	Women's singles	1294	4 Q	Zhang (CHN); W 221-184	Hwang (KOR); W 193-224	Tan (SGP); L 167-182	2nd place, silver medalist(s)
Zhang Yuhong	Women's singles	1265	7 Q	Chen (CHN); L 221-184	Did not advance		
Peng Rui	Women's singles	1143	33	Did not advance			
Sun Hongdou	Women's singles	1077	42	Did not advance			
Sun Hongdou; Peng Rui	Women's doubles	2239	12	Did not advance			
Chen Dongdong; Zhang Yuhong	Women's doubles	2121	18	Did not advance			
Chen Dongdong; Zhang Yuhong; Sun Hongdou; Peng Rui	Women's team of 4	4686	5	Did not advance			

== Chess ==
China entered 6 athletes to compete in chess. Every athlete earned at least one medal.

=== Individual ===
Athlete	Event	Round 1	Round 2	Round 3	Round 4	Round 5	Round 6	Round 7	Points	Rank
Athlete	Event	Opposition Score	Opposition Score	Opposition Score	Opposition Score	Opposition Score	Opposition Score	Opposition Score	Points	Rank
Yu Yangyi	Men's individual standard	Othman (YEM); W 1-0	Ismagambetov (KAZ); W 1-0	Sengupta (AOI); W 1-0	Saleh (UAE); W 1-0	Ding (CHN); D ½-½	Al-Modiahki (UAE); W 1-0	Batchuluun (MGL); W 1-0	6½	1st place, gold medalist(s)
Ding Liren	Men's individual standard	Al-Zendani (YEM); W 1-0	Gündavaa (MGL); W 1-0	Jumbayev (KAZ); D ½-½	Al-Modiahki (UAE); W 1-0	Yu (CHN); D ½-½	Sengupta (AOI); W 1-0	Saleh (UAE); L 1-0	5	3rd place, bronze medalist(s)
Hou Yifan	Women's individual standard	Bayarmaa (MGL); W 1-0	Kulkarni (AOI); W 1-0	Sukandar (INA); W 1-0	Phạm (VIE); W 1-0	Zhao (CHN); D ½-½	Muminova (UZB); W 1-0	Frayna (PHI); W 1-0	6½	1st place, gold medalist(s)
Zhao Xue	Women's individual standard	Shirin (BAN); W 1-0	Meenakshi (AOI); W 1-0	Aulia (INA); W 1-0	Hejazipour (IRI); W 1-0	Hou (CHN); D ½-½	Kulkarni (AOI); D ½-½	Sukandar (INA); W 1-0	6	2nd place, silver medalist(s)

=== Mixed ===
Athlete	Event	Swiss round								Knockout round		Rank
Athlete	Event	Round 1	Round 2	Round 3	Round 4	Round 5	MP	GP	Rank	Semifinals	Finals	Rank
Athlete	Event	Opposition Score	Opposition Score	Opposition Score	Opposition Score	Opposition Score	Points	Points	Rank	Opposition Score	Opposition Score	Rank
Yu Yangyi; Guo Qi; Hou Yifan; Xiu Deshun; Yu Yangyi; Zhao Xue	Team blitz	Murshed; Ahmed; Akter; Shirin (BAN); W 3-1	Sethuraman; Sengupta; Subbaraman; Kulkarni (AOI); W 4-0	Ghaem-Maghami; Golizadeh; Hejazipour; Khademalsharieh (IRI); W 1½-2½	Lê; Nguyễn; Phạm; Hoàng (VIE); W 2½-1½	Barbosa; Paragua; Perena; Galas (PHI); W 0-4	10	16	1 Q	Megaranto; Rudin; Sukandar; Aulia (INA); W 3½-½	Lê; Nguyễn; Phạm; Nguyễn (VIE); L 1-3	2nd place, silver medalist(s)
Yu Yangyi; Guo Qi; Hou Yifan; Xiu Deshun; Yu Yangyi; Zhao Xue	Team rapid	Murshed; Ahmed; Akter; Shirin (BAN); W 3-1	Megaranto; Firmansyah; Sukandar; Sihite (INA); D 2-2	Jumabayev; Ismagambetov; Subbaraman; Kulkarni (KAZ); W 3½-½	Al-Modiahki; Al-Sayed; Zhu; Al-Khelaifi (QAT); W ½-3½	Lê; Nguyễn; Phạm; Hoàng (VIE); L 2½-1½	7	13½	4 Q	Lê; Nguyễn; Phạm; Nguyễn (VIE); W 1½-2½	Sethuraman; Sengupta; Subbaraman; Kulkarni (AOI); W 1-3	1st place, gold medalist(s)

== Cue sports ==
China competed in cue sports.

=== Men ===
Athlete	Event	Round of 64	Round of 32	Round of 16	Quarterfinal	Semifinal	Final	
Athlete	Event	Opposition Result	Opposition Result	Opposition Result	Opposition Result	Opposition Result	Opposition Result	Rank
Han Haoxiang	Nine-ball singles	Amir (MAS); W 4-9	Kuribayashi (JPN); W 3-9	Nasution (INA); L 9-5	Did not advance			
Li Hewen	Nine-ball singles	Bye	Sorouji (RSA); W 9-1	Pordel (IRI); W 9-6	Murni (BRU); W 9-7	Ko (TPE); L 5-9	Did not advance	3rd place, bronze medalist(s)
Cao Yupeng	Snooker singles	Chin (SGP); W 4-3	Shehab (UAE); W 1-4	Sergelen (MGL); W 4-0	Vafaei (IRI); W 4-0	Mohammad (IRI); W 4-1	Ding (CHN); W 2-4	1st place, gold medalist(s)
Ding Junhui	Snooker singles	Bye	Fung (HKG); W 4-0	Leong (MAS); W 4-2	Heidarinejad (IRI); W 4-1	Mehta (AOI); W 4-2	Cao (CHN); L 2-4	2nd place, silver medalist(s)
Ding Junhui; Liang Wenbo; Tian Pengfei	Snooker team	—N/a	Bye	dos Santos; Fong; Vong (MAC); W 3-0	Pakpoj; Jantad; Saenla (THA); W 3-2	Al-Kojah; Fatima (SYR); W 1-3	Mehta; Damani; Chawla (AOI); W 2-3	1st place, gold medalist(s)
Xiao Guodong	Six-red snooker singles	Bye	Shehab (UAE); W 5-0	Hassan (MAS); W 5-1	Lin (TPE); W 5-2	Al-Obaidly (QAT); W 5-0	Sarkhosh (IRI); W 5-4	1st place, gold medalist(s)
Yu Delu	Six-red snooker singles	Bye	Enkhjargal (MGL); W 0-5	Sarkhosh (IRI); L 5-4	Did not advance			

=== Women ===
Athlete	Event	Round of 64	Round of 32	Round of 16	Quarterfinal	Semifinal	Final	
Athlete	Event	Opposition Result	Opposition Result	Opposition Result	Opposition Result	Opposition Result	Opposition Result	Rank
Fu Xiaofang	Nine-ball singles	—N/a	Amit (PHI); W 4-7	Sabtu (MAS); W 2-7	Chou (INA); L 7-4	Did not advance		
Liu Shasha	Nine-ball singles	—N/a	Bye	Huỳnh (VIE); W 0-7	Kim (KOR); L 7-2	Did not advance		
Chen Siming	Ten-ball singles	—N/a	Chou (TPE); L 7-3	Did not advance				
Pan Xiaoting	Ten-ball singles	—N/a	Klaudia (MAS); W 1-7	Chai (SGP); W 5-7	Cha (KOR); L 2-7	Did not advance		
Shi Chunxia	Six-red snooker singles	—N/a	Bye	Đoàn (VIE); W 4-0	Magimairaj (AOI); L 3-4	Did not advance		
Han Yu	Six-red snooker singles	—N/a	Bye	Ip (HKG); L4-1	Did not advance			

== Dancesport ==
China competed in dancesport.

=== Standard ===
Athlete	Event	Quarterfinal		Semifinal		Final	Rank
Athlete	Event	Points	Rank	Points	Rank	Points	Rank
Zhao Peng; Wang Qi	Five dances	—N/a		45	=1 Q	218.57	1st place, gold medalist(s)
Zhang Zhanhua; Zhang Ruonan	Slow foxtrot	—N/a		9	=1 Q	43.21	1st place, gold medalist(s)
Zhao Peng; Wang Qi	Tango	—N/a		9	=1 Q	41.73	1st place, gold medalist(s)
Zhang Zhanhua; Zhang Ruonan	Waltz	—N/a		9	=1 Q	43.13	1st place, gold medalist(s)

=== Latin ===
Athlete	Event	Quarterfinal		Semifinal		Final	Rank
Athlete	Event	Points	Rank	Points	Rank	Points	Rank
Hou Yao; Zhuang Ting	Five dances	—N/a		44	1 Q	215.41	1st place, gold medalist(s)
Hou Yao; Zhuang Ting	Cha-cha-cha	9	=1 Q	9	=1 Q	43.34	1st place, gold medalist(s)
Yan Bangbang; Zhu Jing	Paso doble	—N/a		6	7	Did not advance	
Yan Bangbang; Zhu Jing	Samba	—N/a		8	3 Q	39.23	5

== Esports ==
China competed in esports.

=== FIFA 13 ===
Athlete	Event	Group stage				Knockout stage			
Athlete	Event	Group stage				Quarterfinal	Semifinal	Final	Rank
Athlete	Event	Opposition Result	Opposition Result	Opposition Result	Rank	Opposition Result	Opposition Result	Opposition Result	Rank
Chen Wei	FIFA 13	—N/a	Tulyaganov (UZB); D 1-1	Trương (VIE); W 2-1	1 Q	Tulyaganov (UZB); W 0–1, 1–0, 1-0	Khoei (IRI); W 0^{1}-0^{4}, 2-1	Saprikin (UZB); L 1–2, 2–1, 3-2	2nd place, silver medalist(s)
Yang Zheng	FIFA 13	Basu (AOI); W 5-2	Shen (MAS); L 0-1	Musthafa (MDV); L 3-4	3	Did not advance			

=== StarCraft II: Heart of the Swarm ===
Athlete	Event	Group stage					Knockout stage		
Athlete	Event	Group stage					Semifinal	Final	Rank
Athlete	Event	Opposition Result	Opposition Result	Opposition Result	Opposition Result	Rank	Opposition Result	Opposition Result	Rank
Hu Xiang	StarCraft II: Heart of the Swarm	—N/a	Shaki (IRI); L	Kim (KOR); L	Yang (TPE); L	4	Did not advance		
Li Junfeng	StarCraft II: Heart of the Swarm	Moghavem (IRI); WO	Lee (KOR); L	Tsogt (MGL); W	Chen (TPE); W	2 Q	Lee (KOR); L 2-0	Yang (TPE); W 2-1	3rd place, bronze medalist(s)

=== League of Legends ===
Athlete	Event	Group stage				Tiebreaker			Knockout stage		Rank
Athlete	Event	Opposition Result	Opposition Result	Opposition Result	Rank	Opposition Result	Opposition Result	Rank	Semifinal	Final	Rank
Athlete	Event	Opposition Result	Opposition Result	Opposition Result	Rank	Opposition Result	Opposition Result	Rank	Opposition Result	Opposition Result	Rank
Feng Zhuojun; Gao Xuecheng; Ji Xing; Ming Kai; Wei Handong; Yu Jingxi	League of Legends	Choi; Kim; Ko; Won; Yoo (KOR); L	Huỳnh; Mai; Nguyễn; Trần; Trần (VIE); L	Chen; Chiu; Chou; Lu; Wang (TPE); W	=2	Chen; Chiu; Chou; Lu; Wang (TPE); W	Huỳnh; Mai; Nguyễn; Trần; Trần (VIE); W	1 Q	Chen; Chiu; Chou; Lu; Wang (TPE); W 2-0	Choi; Kim; Ko; Won; Yoo (KOR); L 2-1	2nd place, silver medalist(s)

== Futsal ==
China entered men's and women's teams in futsal. Neither team won a medal.

=== Summary ===
Team	Event	Group Stage				Quarterfinal	Semifinal	Final / BM	
Team	Event	Opposition Score	Opposition Score	Opposition Score	Opposition Score	Rank	Opposition Score	Opposition Score	Rank
China men's	Men's tournament	—N/a	(Chinese Taipei) Chinese Taipei; W 5-0	(Indonesia) Indonesia; W 5-3	1 Q	(Iran) Iran; L 8-0	Did not advance		
China women's	Women's tournament	(Indonesia) Indonesia; L 2-1	(Japan) Japan; L 2-5	(Uzbekistan) Uzbekistan; D 1-1	3	Did not advance			

=== Men's roster ===
- Cong Lin
- Deng Tao
- Feng Wei
- Geng Deyang
- Gu Haitao
- Hu Jie
- Li Kai
- Liang Shuang
- Liu Chang
- Lu Yue
- Wang Jialin
- Wang Jun
- Zeng Liang
- Zhang Wen

=== Women's roster ===
- Fan Yingming
- Fu Yao
- Han Ying
- Hu Yingjie
- Liu Dan
- Lü Yang
- Song Guanman
- Xiao Ying
- Xie Yujia
- Zhang Can
- Zhang Meini
- Zhang Qiannan
- Zhang Rui
- Zheng Jin

== Go ==
China competed in go.

=== Individual ===
Athlete	Event	Swiss round								Knockout round		Rank
Athlete	Event	Round 1	Round 2	Round 3	Round 4	Round 5	Points	Score	Rank	Semifinal	Final	Rank
Athlete	Event	Opposition Score	Opposition Score	Opposition Score	Opposition Score	Opposition Score	Points	Score	Rank	Opposition Score	Opposition Score	Rank
Tan Xiao	Men's individual	Lam (MAC); W 2-0	Chen (TPE); W 2-0	Chan (HKG); W 2-0	Lee (KOR); W 2-0	Tang (CHN); W 2-0	10	32	1 Q	Byeon (KOR); L 0-2	Did not advance	3rd place, bronze medalist(s)
Tang Weixing	Men's individual	Chan (MAC); W 2-0	Punuerai (THA); W 2-0	Byeon (KOR); W 2-0	Tsuruta (JPN); W 2-0	Tan (CHN); L 2-0	8	28	3 Q	Lee (KOR); W 0-2	Byeon (KOR); W 0-2	1st place, gold medalist(s)

=== Team ===
Athlete	Event	Swiss round							Knockout round		Rank
Athlete	Event	Round 1	Round 2	Round 3	Round 4	MP	GP	Rank	Semifinal	Final	Rank
Athlete	Event	Opposition Score	Opposition Score	Opposition Score	Opposition Score	MP	GP	Rank	Opposition Score	Opposition Score	Rank
Mi Yuting; Peng Liyao; Tan Xiao; Tang Weixing	Men's team	Hirata; Motoki; Sada; Tsuruta (JPN); W 6-0	Chen; Chou; Hsiao; Lin (TPE); W 6-0	Byeon; Kang; Lee; Na (KOR); W 4-2	Srisin; Punuerai; Sampaokaew; Taechaamnuayvit (THA); W 6-0	8	22	1 Q	Chen; Chou; Hsiao; Lin (TPE); W 6-0	Byeon; Kang; Lee; Na (KOR); L 2-4	2nd place, silver medalist(s)
Gao Xing; Wang Shuang; Yu Zhiying; Zhang Peipei	Women's team	Choi; Kim; Oh; Oh (KOR); W 4-2	Aroonphaichitra; Jaruratchataphun; Prathoomwan; Wongchugaew (THA); W 6-0	Chang; Chang; Missingham; Su (TPE); W 4-2	Goh; Kwa; Tan; Zhang (SGP); W 6-0	8	22	1 Q	Chang; Chang; Missingham; Su (TPE); W 4-2	Choi; Kim; Oh; Oh (KOR); W 4-2	1st place, gold medalist(s)

=== Pairs ===
Athlete	Event	Swiss round								Knockout round		Rank
Athlete	Event	Round 1	Round 2	Round 3	Round 4	Round 5	Points	SOS	Rank	Semifinal	Final	Rank
Athlete	Event	Opposition Score	Opposition Score	Opposition Score	Opposition Score	Opposition Score	Points	SOS	Rank	Opposition Score	Opposition Score	Rank
Mi Yuting; Yu Zhiying	Mixed pair	Taechaamnuayvit; Aroonphaichitra (THA); W 2-0	Chou; Chang (TPE); W 2-0	Yang; Kan (HKG); W 2-0	Kang; Oh (KOR); L 0-2	Motoki; Fujisawa (JPN); W 2-0	8	32	2 Q	Peng; Gao (CHN); L 0-2	Did not advance	3rd place, bronze medalist(s)
Peng Liyao; Gao Xing	Mixed pair	Zulkifli; Low (MAS); W 2-0	Kang; Oh (KOR); L 0-2	Kwa; Ho (SGP); W 2-0	Yang; Kan (HKG); W 2-0	Chou; Chang (TPE); W 2-0	8	26	3 Q	Mi; Yu (CHN); W 0-2	Na; Choi (KOR); W 0-2	1st place, gold medalist(s)

== Muaythai ==
China entered five athletes in muaythai. Each athlete earned a medal.

=== Men ===
Athlete	Event	Round of 16	Quarterfinals	Semifinals	Final	Rank
Athlete	Event	Opposition Result	Opposition Result	Opposition Result	Opposition Result	Rank
Li Gang	54 kg	Bye	Salam (SYR); W 5-0	Kim (KOR); L 1-4	Did not advance	3rd place, bronze medalist(s)
Guo Dongwang	67 kg	Matysaev (KGZ); W RSCH	Kholmuratov (UZB); W 2-3	Pansuwan (THA); L 5-0	Did not advance	3rd place, bronze medalist(s)
Zhang Jinlei	71 kg	—N/a	Bye	Min (MYA); W 3-2	Matli (THA); L 5-0	2nd place, silver medalist(s)

=== Women ===
Athlete	Event	Round of 16	Quarterfinals	Semifinals	Final	
Athlete	Event	Opposition Result	Opposition Result	Opposition Result	Opposition Result	Rank
Yuan Xiaoyan	51 kg	—N/a	Aoun (LBN); W 5-0	Wongsriwo (THA); L 0-5	Did not advance	3rd place, bronze medalist(s)
Yang Yang	54 kg	Barzegari (IRI); W 5-0	Mahmood (IRQ); W 0-5	Phan (VIE); L 4-1	Did not advance	3rd place, bronze medalist(s)

== Short course swimming ==
China competed in short course swimming.

=== Men ===
Athlete	Event	Heat		Final	
Athlete	Event	Time	Rank	Time	Rank
Liu Junwu	50 m freestyle	22.69	6 Q	22.62	5
Zhang Zhongchao	50 m freestyle	23.00	9	Did not advance	
Liu Junwu	100 m freestyle	49.64	2 Q	49.18	2nd place, silver medalist(s)
Zhang Zhongchao	100 m freestyle	52.53	22	Did not advance	
Mao Feilian	200 m freestyle	1:48.12	2 Q	1:44.54 GR	1st place, gold medalist(s)
Zhang Zhongchao	200 m freestyle	1:48.99	3 Q	1:46.47	3rd place, bronze medalist(s)
Sun Xiaolei	50 m backstroke	23.65	1 Q	23.50	1st place, gold medalist(s)
Sun Xiaolei	100 m backstroke	54.88	3 Q	51.30	2nd place, silver medalist(s)
Xue Jiajia	50 m backstroke	28.01	4 Q	27.86	4
Xue Jiajia	100 m backstroke	1:01.22	4 Q	1:00.40	4
Xu Zhijie	50 m butterfly	24.61	6 Q	24.28	6
Shi Ji	50 m butterfly	25.35	14	Did not advance	
Xu Zhijie	100 m butterfly	53.33	5 Q	53.35	5
Shi Ji	100 m butterfly	55.50	15	Did not advance	
Sun Xiaolei	100 m individual medley	56.43	4 Q	53.72 GR	1st place, gold medalist(s)
Liu Junwu	100 m individual medley	55.67	2 Q	55.47	4
Mao Feilian	100 m individual medley	2:01.62	1 Q	1:56.61 GR	1st place, gold medalist(s)
Shi Ji	100 m individual medley	2:08.70	19	Did not advance	
Liu Junwu; Mao Feilian; Sun Xiaolei; Zhang Zhongchao	4 × 50 m freestyle relay	1:30.69	2 Q	1:28.64 GR	1st place, gold medalist(s)
Liu Junwu; Mao Feilian; Xu Zhijie; Zhang Zhongchao	4 × 100 m freestyle relay	3:20.89	1 Q	3:15.74 GR	1st place, gold medalist(s)
Sun Xiaolei; Xue Jiajia; Xu Zhijie; Liu Junwu	4 × 50 m medley relay	1:39.17	2 Q	1:36.00 GR	1st place, gold medalist(s)
Sun Xiaolei; Mao Feilian; Xu Zhijie; Zhang Zhongchao	4 × 100 m medley relay	3:43.46	3 Q	3:30.20 GR	1st place, gold medalist(s)

=== Women ===
Athlete	Event	Heat		Final	
Athlete	Event	Time	Rank	Time	Rank
Wang Siqi	50 m freestyle	26.42	7 Q	26.17	8
Chen Xiaojun	50 m freestyle	26.82	11	Did not advance	
Wang Fei	100 m freestyle	56.43	2 Q	55.07	4
Ren Luomeng	100 m freestyle	58.95	11	Did not advance	
Wang Fei	200 m freestyle	2:02.21	3 Q	1:57.19 GR	1st place, gold medalist(s)
Ren Luomeng	200 m freestyle	2:03.05	5 Q	2:00.69	5
Zhou Yanxin	50 m backstroke	27.65	1 Q	27.24 GR	1st place, gold medalist(s)
Zhou Yanxin	100 m backstroke	1:00.23	1 Q	57.96 GR	1st place, gold medalist(s)
Fan Rong	50 m breaststroke	32.57	5 Q	32.19	5
Liu Siwen	50 m breaststroke	32.78	7 Q	32.55	6
Fan Rong	100 m breaststroke	1:09.87	6 Q	1:08.42	4
Liu Siwen	100 m breaststroke	1:09.46	3 Q	1:09.46	6
Gong Jie	50 m butterfly	28.02	8 Q	27.54	7
Wang Siqi	50 m butterfly	29.93	15	Did not advance	
Gong Jie	100 butterfly	1:00.89	5 Q	59.59	4
Zhou Yanxin	100 m individual medley	1:04.07	5 Q	1:01.24 GR	1st place, gold medalist(s)
Chen Xiaojun	100 m individual medley	1:06.81	11	Did not advance	
Zhou Yanxin	200 individual medley	2:15.76	2 Q	2:10.36	2nd place, silver medalist(s)
Chen Xiaojun	200 individual medley	2:18.16	6 Q	2:17.40	6
Wang Siqi; Zhou Yanxin; Chen Xiaojun; Wang Fei; Fan Rong; Liu Siwen	4 × 50 m freestyle relay	1:47.42	5 Q	1:42.62	2nd place, silver medalist(s)
Wang Siqi; Liu Siwen; Gong Jie; Wang Fei; Ren Luomeng	4 × 100 m freestyle relay	3:50.08	1 Q	3:41.63 GR	1st place, gold medalist(s)
Zhou Yanxin; Liu Siwen; Gong Jie; Wang Fei	4 × 50 m medley relay	1:53.07	2 Q	1:51.72	2nd place, silver medalist(s)
Zhou Yanxin; Liu Siwen; Gong Jie; Wang Fei	4 × 100 m medley relay	4:10.51	1 Q	3:58.31 GR	1st place, gold medalist(s)
