= Esports at the 2013 Asian Indoor and Martial Arts Games =

- Venue: Samsan World Gymnasium
- Dates: 29 June – 2 July 2013

Esports for the 2013 Asian Indoor and Martial Arts Games was held at the Incheon Samsan World Gymnasium. It took place from 29 June to 2 July 2013. Six video games were chosen to be part of this Indoor and Martial Arts Games, FIFA 13, Need for Speed: Shift 2 Unleashed, StarCraft II: Heart of the Swarm, Tekken Tag Tournament 2, League of Legends and Special Force.

== Medalists ==
Event	Gold	Silver	Bronze
FIFA 13	Pavel Saprikin; Uzbekistan	Chen Wei; China	Chew Hoe Shen; Malaysia
Need for Speed: Shift 2 Unleashed	Alexandr Kravchenko; Kazakhstan	Sardorbek Abdullaev; Uzbekistan	Nguyễn Lê Văn; Vietnam
StarCraft II: Heart of the Swarm	Kim Yoo-jin; South Korea	Lee Young-ho; South Korea	Li Junfeng; China
Tekken Tag Tournament 2	Kim Hyun-jin; South Korea	Bae Jae-min; South Korea	Shih Chen-sheng; Chinese Taipei
League of Legends	South Korea; Choi In-seok; Kim Chan-ho; Ko Dong-bin; Won Sang-yeon; Yoo Sang-wook	China; Feng Zhuojun; Gao Xuecheng; Ji Xing; Ming Kai; Wei Handong; Yu Jingxi	Chinese Taipei; Chen Hui-chung; Chiu Po-chieh; Chou Chun-an; Lu Jung-da; Wang Yung-chieh
Special Force	South Korea; Do Min-su; Jeong Su-ik; Kim Dong-ho; Lee Sung-wan; Leem Kuk-hyun	Chinese Taipei; Cheng Ming-hung; Chuang Jen-chieh; Lin Guan-heng; Wang Sian-chih; Ying Hsun	Kazakhstan; Merey Bekbayev; Dauren Kystaubayev; Adlet Nurseitov; Tamerlan Razbekov; Ilyas Sarsenbayev; Malik Sualirov

== Medal table ==
Rank	Nation	Gold	Silver	Bronze	Total
1	South Korea (KOR)	4	2	0	6
2	Uzbekistan (UZB)	1	1	0	2
3	Kazakhstan (KAZ)	1	0	1	2
4	China (CHN)	0	2	1	3
5	Chinese Taipei (TPE)	0	1	2	3
6	Malaysia (MAS)	0	0	1	1
6	Vietnam (VIE)	0	0	1	1
Totals (7 entries)		6	6	6	18

== Results ==
=== FIFA 13 ===
==== Group stage ====
29–30 June

Group A
Pos	Athlete	Pld	W	D	L	Pts	CHN	UZB	VIE
1	Chen Wei (CHN)	2	1	1	0	4	—	1–1	2–1
2	Kirill Tulyaganov (UZB)	2	0	2	0	2	1–1	—	1–1
3	Trương Đức Hiếu (VIE)	2	0	1	1	1	1–2	1–1	—

Group B
Pos	Athlete	Pld	W	D	L	Pts	IRI	KAZ	QAT	TJK
1	Davoud Khoei (IRI)	3	3	0	0	9	—	3–1	5–3	5–0
2	Ruslan Mullokandov (KAZ)	3	2	0	1	6	1–3	—	4–0	4–0
3	Mohammed Basulaiman (QAT)	3	1	0	2	3	3–5	0–4	—	4–0
4	Azam Muminov (TJK)	3	0	0	3	0	0–5	0–4	0–4	—

Group C
Pos	Athlete	Pld	W	D	L	Pts	IRI	UZB	VIE
1	Morteza Montazerozzohour (IRI)	2	1	1	0	4	—	0–0	4–0
2	Pavel Saprikin (UZB)	2	0	2	0	2	0–0	—	1–1
3	Tô Trung Hiếu (VIE)	2	0	1	1	1	0–4	1–1	—

Group D
Pos	Athlete	Pld	W	D	L	Pts	MAS	MDV	CHN	AOI
1	Chew Hoe Shen (MAS)	3	3	0	0	9	—	4–1	1–0	3–1
2	Abdulla Asif Musthafa (MDV)	3	2	0	1	6	1–4	—	4–3	4–2
3	Yang Zheng (CHN)	3	1	0	2	3	0–1	3–4	—	5–2
4	Santanu Basu (AOI)	3	0	0	3	0	1–3	2–4	2–5	—

Source: Official website

==== Knockout stage ====
Quarterfinals; 30 June
Chew Hoe Shen (MAS)	1	1	3
Abdulla Asif Musthafa (MDV)	0	2	1
Morteza Montazerozzohour (IRI)	0^{5}	0^{1}
Pavel Saprikin (UZB)	0^{6}	0^{4}
Chen Wei (CHN)	0	1	1
Kirill Tulyaganov (UZB)	1	0	0
Davoud Khoei (IRI)	1	2	3
Ruslan Mullokandov (KAZ)	2	1	1

Semifinals; 2 July
Chew Hoe Shen (MAS)	0	4	1
Pavel Saprikin (UZB)	1	0	2
Chen Wei (CHN)	0^{4}	2
Davoud Khoei (IRI)	0^{1}	1

Gold Medal Match; 2 July
Pavel Saprikin (UZB)	1	2	3
Chen Wei (CHN)	2	1	2
Bronze medal match
Chew Hoe Shen (MAS)	2^{4}	4	2
Davoud Khoei (IRI)	2^{5}	1	0

=== Need for Speed: Shift 2 Unleashed ===
==== Preliminary round ====
30 June

Rank	Athlete	R1	R2	R3	R4	R5	Total
Heat A
1	Alexandr Kravchenko (KAZ)	10	10	10	10	10	50
2	Omer Al-Emadi (QAT)	7	7	7	7	7	35
3	Sarvesh Agarwal (AOI)	5	5	5	5	5	25
Heat B
1	Sardorbek Abdullaev (UZB)	7	10	7	7	7	38
2	Nguyễn Lê Văn (VIE)	5	7	10	10	5	37
3	Hadi Basiri (IRI)	10	5	5	5	10	35
—	Rakhim Kakharov (TJK)						DNS

==== Final round ====
1 July

Rank	Athlete	R1	R2	R3	R4	R5	R6	R7	Total
1st place, gold medalist(s)	Alexandr Kravchenko (KAZ)	10	10	5	5	10	10	7	57
2nd place, silver medalist(s)	Sardorbek Abdullaev (UZB)	7	5	10	7	5	7	10	51
3rd place, bronze medalist(s)	Nguyễn Lê Văn (VIE)	5	7	7	10	7	5	5	46
4	Omer Al-Emadi (QAT)	3	3	3	3	3	3	3	21

=== StarCraft II: Heart of the Swarm ===
==== Group stage ====
29–30 June

Group A
Pos	Athlete	Pld	W	L	Pts	TPE	KOR	IRI	CHN
1	Yang Chia-cheng (TPE)	3	3	0	3	—	1–0	1–0	1–0
2	Kim Yoo-jin (KOR)	3	2	1	2	0–1	—	1–0	1–0
3	Shahriar Shaki (IRI)	3	1	2	1	0–1	0–1	—	1–0
4	Hu Xiang (CHN)	3	0	3	0	0–1	0–1	0–1	—

Group B
Pos	Athlete	Pld	W	L	Pts	KOR	CHN	TPE	MGL	IRI
1	Lee Young-ho (KOR)	4	3	1	3	—	1–0	0–1	1–0	WO
2	Li Junfeng (CHN)	4	3	1	3	0–1	—	1–0	1–0	WO
3	Chen Ko-woei (TPE)	4	3	1	3	1–0	0–1	—	1–0	WO
4	Enkhtöriin Tsogt (MGL)	4	1	3	1	0–1	0–1	0–1	—	WO
5	Mohammad Ali Moghavem (IRI)	4	0	4	0					—

Source: Official website

==== Knockout stage ====
Semifinals; 30 June
Lee Young-ho (KOR)	2
Li Junfeng (CHN)	0
Kim Yoo-jin (KOR)	2
Yang Chia-cheng (TPE)	1

Gold medal match 2 July
Lee Young-ho (KOR)	1
Kim Yoo-jin (KOR)	2
Bronze medal match
Li Junfeng (CHN)	2
Yang Chia-cheng (TPE)	1

=== Tekken Tag Tournament 2 ===
==== Group stage ====
29–30 June

Group A
Pos	Athlete	Pld	W	L	KOR	TPE	MGL	IRI	TJK
1	Bae Jae-min (KOR)	4	4	0	—	3–0	3–0	3–0	WO
2	Chen Yu-chang (TPE)	4	3	1	0–3	—	3–0	3–0	3–0
3	Boldyn Khosbayar (MGL)	4	2	2	0–3	0–3	—	3–0	WO
4	Farzan Homaei (IRI)	4	1	3	0–3	0–3	0–3	—	WO
5	Dzhamoliddin Salakhitdinov (TJK)	4	0	4		0–3			—

Group B
Pos	Athlete	Pld	W	L	KOR	TPE	MGL	MDV	AOI	IRI
1	Kim Hyun-jin (KOR)	5	5	0	—	3–0	3–0	3–0	3–0	WO
2	Shih Chen-sheng (TPE)	5	4	1	0–3	—	3–2	3–0	3–0	3–0
3	Dashdorjiin Mönkhbold (MGL)	5	3	2	0–3	2–3	—	3–0	3–0	WO
4	Shiban Abbas (MDV)	5	2	3	0–3	0–3	0–3	—	3–0	3–0
5	Kabir Tomar (AOI)	5	1	4	0–3	0–3	0–3	0–3	—	WO
6	Arvin Shayegan (IRI)	5	0	5		0–3		0–3		—

Source: Official website

==== Knockout stage ====
Semifinals; 1 July
Bae Jae-min (KOR)	3	3
Chen Yu-chang (TPE)	0	1
Kim Hyun-jin (KOR)	3	3
Shih Chen-sheng (TPE)	0	1

Gold medal match 2 July
Bae Jae-min (KOR)	1	2
Kim Hyun-jin (KOR)	3	3
Bronze medal match
Chen Yu-chang (TPE)	2	2
Shih Chen-sheng (TPE)	3	3

=== League of Legends ===
==== Group stage ====
29 June

Pos	Team	Pld	W	L	Pts	KOR	CHN	TPE	VIE
1	South Korea	3	3	0	3	—	1–0	1–0	1–0
2	China	3	1	2	1	0–1	—	1–0	0–1
3	Chinese Taipei	3	1	2	1	0–1	0–1	—	1–0
4	Vietnam	3	1	2	1	0–1	1–0	0–1	—

Source: Official website

==== Knockout stage ====
Semifinals; 30 June
South Korea	2
Vietnam	0
China	2
Chinese Taipei	0

Gold medal match 1 July
South Korea	2
China	1
Bronze medal match
Vietnam	0
Chinese Taipei	2

=== Special Force ===
==== Group stage ====
29 June

Pos	Team	Pld	W	L	TPE	KOR	KAZ	MGL	TJK
1	Chinese Taipei	4	4	0	—	8–1	8–0	8–0	WO
2	South Korea	4	3	1	1–8	—	8–0	8–0	WO
3	Kazakhstan	4	2	2	0–8	0–8	—	8–1	WO
4	Mongolia	4	1	3	0–8	0–8	1–8	—	WO
5	Tajikistan	4	0	4					—

Source: Official website

==== Knockout stage ====
Semifinals; 30 June
Kazakhstan	0	1
South Korea	8	8
Mongolia	0	0
Chinese Taipei	8	8

Gold medal match 1 July
South Korea	7	8	8
Chinese Taipei	8	3	2
Bronze medal match
Kazakhstan	8	8
Mongolia	0	0
