= Muaythai at the 2013 Asian Indoor and Martial Arts Games =

- Venue: Dowon Gymnasium
- Dates: 29 June – 2 July 2013

Muaythai at the 2013 Asian Indoor and Martial Arts Games was held in Incheon, South Korea at the Dowon Gymnasium. It took place from 29 June to 2 July 2013.

== Medalists ==
=== Men ===
Event	Gold	Silver	Bronze
Bantamweight; 51–54 kg	Kim Sang-jae; South Korea	Baatarchuluuny Gantogtokh; Mongolia	Li Gang; China
Bantamweight; 51–54 kg	Kim Sang-jae; South Korea	Baatarchuluuny Gantogtokh; Mongolia	Bouaphan Phankeo; Laos
Featherweight; 54–57 kg	Nguyễn Trần Duy Nhất; Vietnam	Daniiar Kashkaraev; Kyrgyzstan	Naseer Ahmad Hazara; Afghanistan
Featherweight; 54–57 kg	Nguyễn Trần Duy Nhất; Vietnam	Daniiar Kashkaraev; Kyrgyzstan	Mohd Ali Yaakub; Malaysia
Light welterweight 60–63.5 kg	Vahid Shahbazi; Iran	Latsasack Souliyavong; Laos	Chin Ngai Chung; Hong Kong
Light welterweight 60–63.5 kg	Vahid Shahbazi; Iran	Latsasack Souliyavong; Laos	Ahmad Ondash; Lebanon
Welterweight; 63.5–67 kg	Supachai Pansuwan; Thailand	Masoud Minaei; Iran	Maung Too; Myanmar
Welterweight; 63.5–67 kg	Supachai Pansuwan; Thailand	Masoud Minaei; Iran	Guo Dongwang; China
Light middleweight 67–71 kg	Armin Matli; Thailand	Zhang Jinglei; China	Issa Alamdar; Iran
Light middleweight 67–71 kg	Armin Matli; Thailand	Zhang Jinglei; China	Tun Tun Min; Myanmar
Middleweight; 71–75 kg	Emil Umayev; Kazakhstan	Piyapan Chinanat; Thailand	Saidakhmad Aripov; Uzbekistan
Middleweight; 71–75 kg	Emil Umayev; Kazakhstan	Piyapan Chinanat; Thailand	Trương Quốc Hùng; Vietnam

=== Women ===
Event	Gold	Silver	Bronze
Flyweight; 48–51 kg	Ruchira Wongsriwo; Thailand	Bùi Yến Ly; Vietnam	Yuan Xiaoyan; China
Flyweight; 48–51 kg	Ruchira Wongsriwo; Thailand	Bùi Yến Ly; Vietnam	Lee Sun; South Korea
Bantamweight; 51–54 kg	Ratchadaphon Wihantamma; Thailand	Phan Thị Ngọc Linh; Vietnam	Kim Min-ji; South Korea
Bantamweight; 51–54 kg	Ratchadaphon Wihantamma; Thailand	Phan Thị Ngọc Linh; Vietnam	Yang Yang; China
Lightweight; 57–60 kg	Altansükhiin Zuunnast; Mongolia	Harbans Kaur; Independent Olympic Athletes	Nargis Akhlaqi; Afghanistan
Lightweight; 57–60 kg	Altansükhiin Zuunnast; Mongolia	Harbans Kaur; Independent Olympic Athletes	Rana Mohammed; Iraq

== Medal table ==
Rank	Nation	Gold	Silver	Bronze	Total
1	Thailand (THA)	4	1	0	5
2	Vietnam (VIE)	1	2	1	4
3	Iran (IRI)	1	1	1	3
4	Mongolia (MGL)	1	1	0	2
5	South Korea (KOR)	1	0	2	3
6	Kazakhstan (KAZ)	1	0	0	1
7	China (CHN)	0	1	4	5
8	Laos (LAO)	0	1	1	2
9	Independent Olympic Athletes (AOI)	0	1	0	1
9	Kyrgyzstan (KGZ)	0	1	0	1
11	Afghanistan (AFG)	0	0	2	2
11	Myanmar (MYA)	0	0	2	2
13	Hong Kong (HKG)	0	0	1	1
13	Iraq (IRQ)	0	0	1	1
13	Lebanon (LIB)	0	0	1	1
13	Malaysia (MAS)	0	0	1	1
13	Uzbekistan (UZB)	0	0	1	1
Totals (17 entries)		9	9	18	36

== Results ==
=== Men ===
==== 54 kg ====
Round of 16; 29 June
Sulaiman Sabu (AOI)
Amangeldi Talantov (KGZ)	RSCO
Baatarchuluuny Gantogtokh (MGL)	4
Ho Kwok Keung (HKG)	1
Ilyas Mussin (KAZ)	0
Phillip Delarmino (PHI)	5
Mohd Sukri Hasan (MAS)	0
Bouaphan Phankeo (LAO)	5

Quarterfinals; 30 June
Li Gang (CHN)	5
Ahmed Salam (IRQ)	0
Kim Sang-jae (KOR)	4
Najaf Tamori (AFG)	1
Amangeldi Talantov (KGZ)	2
Baatarchuluuny Gantogtokh (MGL)	3
Phillip Delarmino (PHI)	2
Bouaphan Phankeo (LAO)	3

Semifinals; 1 July
Li Gang (CHN)	1
Kim Sang-jae (KOR)	4
Baatarchuluuny Gantogtokh (MGL)	4
Bouaphan Phankeo (LAO)	1

Final; 2 July
Kim Sang-jae (KOR)	RSCI
Baatarchuluuny Gantogtokh (MGL)

==== 57 kg ====
Quarterfinals; 30 June
Naseer Ahmad Hazara (AFG)	4
Sajad Hussein (IRQ)	1
Daniiar Kashkaraev (KGZ)	5
Abdullah Samour (JOR)	0
Mohd Ali Yaakub (MAS)	4
Shukhratbek Botirov (UZB)	1
Faruh Haitow (TKM)
Nguyễn Trần Duy Nhất (VIE)	RSCB

Semifinals; 1 July
Naseer Ahmad Hazara (AFG)
Daniiar Kashkaraev (KGZ)	WO
Mohd Ali Yaakub (MAS)	0
Nguyễn Trần Duy Nhất (VIE)	5

Final; 2 July
Daniiar Kashkaraev (KGZ)	0
Nguyễn Trần Duy Nhất (VIE)	5

==== 63.5 kg ====
Round of 16; 29 June
Chan Chi Lam (MAC)	0
Fan Chung-chieh (TPE)	5
Osman Ýoldaşow (TKM)	0
Latsasack Souliyavong (LAO)	5
Võ Văn Đài (VIE)	RSCH
Nageshwar Sahu (AOI)

Quarterfinals; 30 June
Vahid Shahbazi (IRI)	5
Hussein Salim (IRQ)	0
Jonathan Polosan (PHI)	2
Chin Ngai Chung (HKG)	3
Ahmad Ondash (LIB)	3
Fan Chung-chieh (TPE)	2
Latsasack Souliyavong (LAO)	3
Võ Văn Đài (VIE)	2

Semifinals; 1 July
Vahid Shahbazi (IRI)	RSCO
Chin Ngai Chung (HKG)
Ahmad Ondash (LIB)	2
Latsasack Souliyavong (LAO)	3

Final; 2 July
Vahid Shahbazi (IRI)	4
Latsasack Souliyavong (LAO)	1

==== 67 kg ====
Round of 16; 29 June
Salar Al-Mouead (SYR)	0
Maung Too (MYA)	5
Son Jun-heok (KOR)	5
Ýusup Bäşimow (TKM)	0
Mohd Zaidi Zawawi (MAS)	0
Masoud Minaei (IRI)	5
Harish Kumar (AOI)
Jay Harold Gregorio (PHI)	RSCI
Ahmad Jawid Hussaini (AFG)	0
Supachai Pansuwan (THA)	5
Zhanserik Amirzhanov (KAZ)	4
Soubin Bansadeth (LAO)	1
Izzeddin Nafez (JOR)	1
Firdavsiy Kholmuratov (UZB)	4
Guo Dongwang (CHN)	RSCH
Bekzhan Matysaev (KGZ)

Quarterfinals; 30 June
Maung Too (MYA)	5
Son Jun-heok (KOR)	0
Masoud Minaei (IRI)	5
Jay Harold Gregorio (PHI)	0
Supachai Pansuwan (THA)	5
Zhanserik Amirzhanov (KAZ)	0
Firdavsiy Kholmuratov (UZB)	2
Guo Dongwang (CHN)	3

Semifinals; 1 July
Maung Too (MYA)	0
Masoud Minaei (IRI)	5
Supachai Pansuwan (THA)	5
Guo Dongwang (CHN)	0

Final; 2 July
Masoud Minaei (IRI)	0
Supachai Pansuwan (THA)	5

==== 71 kg ====
Quarterfinals; 30 June
Armin Matli (THA)	RET
Nusratullo Gayratov (TJK)
Kim Min-su (KOR)
Tun Tun Min (MYA)	RSCB

Semifinals; 1 July
Issa Alamdar (IRI)	0
Armin Matli (THA)	5
Zhang Jinglei (CHN)	3
Tun Tun Min (MYA)	2

Final; 2 July
Armin Matli (THA)	5
Zhang Jinglei (CHN)	0

==== 75 kg ====
Quarterfinals; 30 June
Emil Umayev (KAZ)	5
Alaaddin Jamaan (SYR)	0

Semifinals; 1 July
Saidakhmad Aripov (UZB)	0
Piyapan Chinanat (THA)	5
Trương Quốc Hùng (VIE)	0
Emil Umayev (KAZ)	5

Final; 2 July
Piyapan Chinanat (THA)
Emil Umayev (KAZ)	RSCI

=== Women ===
==== 51 kg ====
Quarterfinals; 30 June
Yuan Xiaoyan (CHN)	5
Anita Aoun (LIB)	0
Ruchira Wongsriwo (THA)	5
Preciosa Ocaya (PHI)	0
Bùi Yến Ly (VIE)	RSCB
Mastaneh Seifabadi (IRI)
Lee Sun (KOR)	5
Hsu Yi-ling (TPE)	0

Semifinals; 1 July
Yuan Xiaoyan (CHN)	0
Ruchira Wongsriwo (THA)	5
Bùi Yến Ly (VIE)	RSCO
Lee Sun (KOR)

Final; 2 July
Ruchira Wongsriwo (THA)	4
Bùi Yến Ly (VIE)	1

- Mastaneh Seifabadi of Iran originally finished 5th, but was disqualified after she tested positive for Drostanolone.

==== 54 kg ====
Round of 16; 29 June
Yang Yang (CHN)	5
Somayyeh Barzegari (IRI)	0

Quarterfinals; 30 June
Nabat Batyrowa (TKM)
Kim Min-ji (KOR)	RSCO
Myra Adin (PHI)
Ratchadaphon Wihantamma (THA)	RSCO
Tawane Vilayphone (LAO)	0
Phan Thị Ngọc Linh (VIE)	5
Atyaf Mahmood (IRQ)	0
Yang Yang (CHN)	5

Semifinals; 1 July
Kim Min-ji (KOR)
Ratchadaphon Wihantamma (THA)	RET
Phan Thị Ngọc Linh (VIE)	4
Yang Yang (CHN)	1

Final; 2 July
Ratchadaphon Wihantamma (THA)	5
Phan Thị Ngọc Linh (VIE)	0

==== 60 kg ====
Quarterfinals; 30 June
Farida Kutlimuradowa (TKM)	0
Altansükhiin Zuunnast (MGL)	5

Semifinals; 1 July
Harbans Kaur (AOI)	WO
Nargis Akhlaqi (AFG)
Rana Mohammed (IRQ)
Altansükhiin Zuunnast (MGL)	RET

Final; 2 July
Harbans Kaur (AOI)
Altansükhiin Zuunnast (MGL)	RSCO
