= Bowling at the 2013 Asian Indoor and Martial Arts Games =

- Venue: Anyang Hogye Gymnasium
- Dates: 30 June – 6 July 2013

Bowling for the 2013 Asian Indoor and Martial Arts Games was held in the Anyang Hogye Gymnasium. It took place from 30 June to 6 July 2013. This was the third time that this sport is in these Games after Macau 2007 and Hanoi 2009.

== Medalists ==
=== Men ===
Event	Gold	Silver	Bronze
Singles	Michael Mak; Hong Kong	Kim Jun-yung; South Korea	Yannaphon Larpapharat; Thailand
Singles	Michael Mak; Hong Kong	Kim Jun-yung; South Korea	Toshihiko Takahashi; Japan
Doubles	South Korea; Park Jong-woo; Shin Seung-hyeon	Japan; Daisuke Yoshida; Tomoyuki Sasaki	Singapore; Joel Tan; Keith Saw
Doubles	South Korea; Park Jong-woo; Shin Seung-hyeon	Japan; Daisuke Yoshida; Tomoyuki Sasaki	United Arab Emirates; Hussain Nasir Al-Suwaidi; Shaker Ali Al-Hassan
Team of 4	Hong Kong; Wu Siu Hong; Eric Tseng; Michael Tsang; Michael Mak	South Korea; Cho Young-seon; Shin Seung-hyeon; Park Jong-woo; Kim Jun-yung	Indonesia; Billy Muhammad Islam; Hardy Rachmadian; Ryan Leonard Lalisang; Yeri Ramadona
Team of 4	Hong Kong; Wu Siu Hong; Eric Tseng; Michael Tsang; Michael Mak	South Korea; Cho Young-seon; Shin Seung-hyeon; Park Jong-woo; Kim Jun-yung	United Arab Emirates; Hussain Nasir Al-Suwaidi; Nayef Eqab; Hareb Al-Mansoori; Shaker Ali Al-Hassan

=== Women ===
Event	Gold	Silver	Bronze
Singles	Daphne Tan; Singapore	Chen Dongdong; China	Hwang Yeon-ju; South Korea
Singles	Daphne Tan; Singapore	Chen Dongdong; China	Son Yun-hee; South Korea
Doubles	Singapore; Bernice Lim; Daphne Tan	South Korea; Son Yun-hee; Hwang Yeon-ju	Chinese Taipei; Wang Ya-ting; Chang Yu-hsuan
Doubles	Singapore; Bernice Lim; Daphne Tan	South Korea; Son Yun-hee; Hwang Yeon-ju	Singapore; Geraldine Ng; New Hui Fen
Team of 4	Chinese Taipei; Wang Ya-ting; Chang Yu-hsuan; Huang Chiung-yao; Tsai Hsin-yi	Malaysia; Hee Kar Yen; Siti Safiyah; Zatil Iman; Dayang Khairuniza	South Korea; Jung Da-wun; Hwang Yeon-ju; Lee Na-young; Son Yun-hee
Team of 4	Chinese Taipei; Wang Ya-ting; Chang Yu-hsuan; Huang Chiung-yao; Tsai Hsin-yi	Malaysia; Hee Kar Yen; Siti Safiyah; Zatil Iman; Dayang Khairuniza	Japan; Haruka Matsuda; Natsuki Teshima; Misaki Mukotani; Hikaru Takekawa

== Medal table ==
Rank	Nation	Gold	Silver	Bronze	Total
1	Singapore (SIN)	2	0	2	4
2	Hong Kong (HKG)	2	0	0	2
3	South Korea (KOR)	1	3	3	7
4	Chinese Taipei (TPE)	1	0	1	2
5	Japan (JPN)	0	1	2	3
6	China (CHN)	0	1	0	1
6	Malaysia (MAS)	0	1	0	1
8	United Arab Emirates (UAE)	0	0	2	2
9	Indonesia (INA)	0	0	1	1
9	Thailand (THA)	0	0	1	1
Totals (10 entries)		6	6	12	24

== Results ==
=== Men ===
==== Singles ====
30 June

===== Preliminary =====
Rank	Athlete	Score
1	Kim Jun-yung (KOR)	1383
2	Toshihiko Takahashi (JPN)	1370
3	Cho Young-seon (KOR)	1347
3	Park Jong-woo (KOR)	1347
5	Timmy Tan (MAS)	1336
6	Michael Mak (HKG)	1318
7	Yannaphon Larpapharat (THA)	1315
8	Wu Siu Hong (HKG)	1311
9	Jaris Goh (SIN)	1307
10	Basel Al-Anzi (KUW)	1305
11	Shin Seung-hyeon (KOR)	1303
12	Eric Tseng (HKG)	1299
13	Aris Ardila (MAS)	1292
14	Raoul Miranda (PHI)	1282
15	Taha Ebrahim Selail (BRN)	1278
16	Sithiphol Kunaksorn (THA)	1273
17	Ryan Leonard Lalisang (INA)	1261
18	Jasem Al-Saqer (KUW)	1258
19	Yeri Ramadona (INA)	1256
20	Isa Al-Awadhi (BRN)	1253
20	Michael Tsang (HKG)	1253
22	Yoshinao Masatoki (JPN)	1251
22	Syimir Abdul Razak (MAS)	1251
24	Mansour Al-Hajri (QAT)	1245
25	Ghalib Al-Busaidi (OMA)	1242
26	Qi Wankang (CHN)	1239
27	Annop Arromsaranon (THA)	1236
27	Tomoyuki Sasaki (JPN)	1236
29	Chang Chih-ming (TPE)	1230
30	Jonathan Chan (MAS)	1221
31	Hareb Al-Mansoori (UAE)	1219
32	Fahad Al-Emadi (QAT)	1218
33	Nayef Eqab (UAE)	1214
34	Moosa Al-Maimani (OMA)	1213
35	Shaker Ali Al-Hassan (UAE)	1212
35	Javier Tan (SIN)	1212
37	Shabbir Dhankot (AOI)	1208
38	Badin Lerdpiriyasakulkit (THA)	1204
39	Daisuke Yoshida (JPN)	1203
40	Yang Nien-hua (TPE)	1202
41	Yousef Al-Jaber (QAT)	1183
42	Jeremy Posadas (PHI)	1180
43	Dhruv Sarda (AOI)	1176
44	Zhang Peng (CHN)	1171
45	Hussain Nasir Al-Suwaidi (UAE)	1167
46	Jeff Carabeo (PHI)	1166
47	Zhang Bo-sheng (TPE)	1165
48	Frederick Ong (PHI)	1164
49	Hardy Rachmadian (INA)	1162
50	Ijaz-ur-Rehman (PAK)	1158
51	Chen Wenchang (CHN)	1155
51	Choi Io Fai (MAC)	1155
53	Joel Tan (SIN)	1151
54	Teng Jui-pu (TPE)	1141
55	Akaash Ashok Kumar (AOI)	1137
56	Ahmed Al-Goud (BRN)	1136
56	Mohammad Al-Regeebah (KUW)	1136
58	Lee Tak Man (MAC)	1131
59	Hassan Al-Kharusi (OMA)	1126
60	Muhammad Hussain Chatta (PAK)	1117
61	Zoe Dias Ma (MAC)	1110
62	Shabbir Lashkerwala (PAK)	1109
63	Rakan Al-Ameeri (KUW)	1101
64	Cai Xiaotian (CHN)	1083
65	Hamid Reza Seyed-Azizollah (IRI)	1080
66	Hamad Al-Mosallam (QAT)	1072
67	Tseveen-Ochiryn Batjargal (MGL)	1062
68	Keith Saw (SIN)	1060
69	Billy Muhammad Islam (INA)	1058
70	Masood Saberi (BRN)	1053
71	Parvez Ahmed Saud (AOI)	1032
72	Sharyn Baatar (MGL)	987
73	Hassan Al-Alawi (OMA)	982
73	Hossein Vanaki (IRI)	982
75	Chan Tak Seng (MAC)	956
76	Dorjgotovyn Mönkh-Amgalan (MGL)	932
—	Saleem Baig (PAK)	DNS

===== Knockout round =====
Quarterfinals		Semifinals		Gold medal match
Kim Jun-yung (KOR)	257
Jaris Goh (SIN)	226	Kim Jun-yung (KOR)	193
Cho Young-seon (KOR)	209	Yannaphon Larpapharat (THA)	189
Yannaphon Larpapharat (THA)	248			Kim Jun-yung (KOR)	203
Toshihiko Takahashi (JPN)	228			Michael Mak (HKG)	204
Wu Siu Hong (HKG)	211	Toshihiko Takahashi (JPN)	210
Timmy Tan (MAS)	202	Michael Mak (HKG)	243
Michael Mak (HKG)	224

==== Doubles ====
2 July

===== Preliminary =====
Rank	Team	Score
1	Japan (JPN); Daisuke Yoshida; Tomoyuki Sasaki	2651
2	Hong Kong (HKG); Wu Siu Hong; Michael Mak	2598
3	South Korea (KOR); Park Jong-woo; Shin Seung-hyeon	2595
4	United Arab Emirates (UAE); Hussain Nasir Al-Suwaidi; Shaker Ali Al-Hassan	2571
5	South Korea (KOR); Cho Young-seon; Kim Jun-yung	2560
6	Malaysia (MAS); Jonathan Chan; Aris Ardila	2558
7	Singapore (SIN); Joel Tan; Keith Saw	2475
8	Chinese Taipei (TPE); Zhang Bo-sheng; Chang Chih-ming	2448
9	Malaysia (MAS); Syimir Abdul Razak; Timmy Tan	2432
10	Singapore (SIN); Javier Tan; Jaris Goh	2421
11	Hong Kong (HKG); Michael Tsang; Eric Tseng	2405
12	Japan (JPN); Toshihiko Takahashi; Yoshinao Masatoki	2402
13	Bahrain (BRN); Ahmed Al-Goud; Taha Ebrahim Selail	2369
14	Indonesia (INA); Ryan Leonard Lalisang; Yeri Ramadona	2354
15	China (CHN); Cai Xiaotian; Chen Wenchang	2338
16	Philippines (PHI); Jeremy Posadas; Raoul Miranda	2336
17	Chinese Taipei (TPE); Teng Jui-pu; Yang Nien-hua	2333
18	United Arab Emirates (UAE); Hareb Al-Mansoori; Nayef Eqab	2326
19	Thailand (THA); Annop Arromsaranon; Yannaphon Larpapharat	2322
20	Thailand (THA); Badin Lerdpiriyasakulkit; Sithiphol Kunaksorn	2309
21	Philippines (PHI); Frederick Ong; Jeff Carabeo	2307
22	Qatar (QAT); Fahad Al-Emadi; Yousef Al-Jaber	2292
22	Kuwait (KUW); Rakan Al-Ameeri; Jasem Al-Saqer	2292
24	Macau (MAC); Choi Io Fai; Lee Tak Man	2254
25	Independent Olympic Athletes (AOI); Dhruv Sarda; Parvez Ahmed Saud	2203
26	Bahrain (BRN); Isa Al-Awadhi; Masood Saberi	2188
27	Qatar (QAT); Hamad Al-Mosallam; Mansour Al-Hajri	2185
28	China (CHN); Zhang Peng; Qi Wankang	2173
29	Indonesia (INA); Billy Muhammad Islam; Hardy Rachmadian	2160
30	Independent Olympic Athletes (AOI); Akaash Ashok Kumar; Shabbir Dhankot	2157
31	Oman (OMA); Ghalib Al-Busaidi; Moosa Al-Maimani	2154
32	Kuwait (KUW); Mohammad Al-Regeebah; Basel Al-Anzi	2125
32	Macau (MAC); Zoe Dias Ma; Chan Tak Seng	2108
34	Iran (IRI); Hossein Vanaki; Hamid Reza Seyed-Azizollah	2098
35	Oman (OMA); Hassan Al-Alawi; Hassan Al-Kharusi	1970
36	Mongolia (MGL); Sharyn Baatar; Tseveen-Ochiryn Batjargal	1936
37	Pakistan (PAK); Ijaz-ur-Rehman; Shabbir Lashkerwala	1913

===== Knockout round =====
Quarterfinals		Semifinals		Gold medal match
Daisuke Yoshida (JPN); Tomoyuki Sasaki (JPN)	499
Zhang Bo-sheng (TPE); Chang Chih-ming (TPE)	394	Daisuke Yoshida (JPN); Tomoyuki Sasaki (JPN)	468
Wu Siu Hong (HKG); Michael Mak (HKG)	381	Joel Tan (SIN); Keith Saw (SIN)	397
Joel Tan (SIN); Keith Saw (SIN)	404			Daisuke Yoshida (JPN); Tomoyuki Sasaki (JPN)	400
Park Jong-woo (KOR); Shin Seung-hyeon (KOR)	381			Park Jong-woo (KOR); Shin Seung-hyeon (KOR)	442
Jonathan Chan (MAS); Aris Ardila (MAS)	322	Park Jong-woo (KOR); Shin Seung-hyeon (KOR)	441
Hussain Nasir Al-Suwaidi (UAE); Shaker Ali Al-Hassan (UAE)	443	Hussain Nasir Al-Suwaidi (UAE); Shaker Ali Al-Hassan (UAE)	433
Cho Young-seon (KOR); Kim Jun-yung (KOR)	362

==== Team of 4 ====
===== Preliminary =====
4–5 July

Rank	Team	Score
1	South Korea (KOR)	5281
2	Hong Kong (HKG)	5169
3	United Arab Emirates (UAE)	5103
4	Indonesia (INA)	5012
5	Malaysia (MAS)	5008
6	Singapore (SIN)	4959
7	Japan (JPN)	4957
8	Philippines (PHI)	4851
9	China (CHN)	4812
10	Thailand (THA)	4723
11	Independent Olympic Athletes (AOI)	4708
12	Qatar (QAT)	4700
13	Kuwait (KUW)	4637
14	Chinese Taipei (TPE)	4629
15	Macau (MAC)	4519
16	Bahrain (BRN)	4360
17	Oman (OMA)	3925

===== Knockout round =====
6 July

Semifinals		Gold medal match
South Korea	847
Indonesia	736	South Korea	876
Hong Kong	856	Hong Kong	886
United Arab Emirates	838

=== Women ===
==== Singles ====
1 July

===== Preliminary =====
Rank	Athlete	Score
1	Hwang Yeon-ju (KOR)	1354
2	Daphne Tan (SIN)	1336
3	Son Yun-hee (KOR)	1296
4	Chen Dongdong (CHN)	1294
5	Lee Na-young (KOR)	1279
6	Jung Da-wun (KOR)	1271
7	Zhang Yuhong (CHN)	1265
8	Misaki Mukotani (JPN)	1259
9	Sharon Limansantoso (INA)	1247
10	Krizziah Tabora (PHI)	1229
11	Tanaprang Sathean (THA)	1226
12	Haruka Matsuda (JPN)	1218
12	New Hui Fen (SIN)	1218
14	Chan Shuk Han (HKG)	1211
15	Huang Chiung-yao (TPE)	1208
16	Tannya Roumimper (INA)	1207
17	Wang Ya-ting (TPE)	1197
18	Chang Yu-hsuan (TPE)	1194
19	Bernice Lim (SIN)	1186
19	Novie Phang (INA)	1186
21	Milki Ng (HKG)	1184
22	Hee Kar Yen (MAS)	1182
23	Siti Safiyah (MAS)	1177
23	Natsuki Teshima (JPN)	1177
25	Liza Clutario (PHI)	1170
25	Liza del Rosario (PHI)	1170
27	Chan Weng Sam (MAC)	1169
28	Hikaru Takekawa (JPN)	1165
29	Angkana Netrviseth (THA)	1159
30	Geraldine Ng (SIN)	1157
31	Filomena Choi (MAC)	1149
32	Hui Tong (MAC)	1148
33	Peng Rui (CHN)	1143
34	Victoria Chan (HKG)	1137
34	Rachelle Leon (PHI)	1137
36	Korngunya Aree (THA)	1128
37	Putty Armein (INA)	1123
38	Julia Lam (MAC)	1121
39	Zatil Iman (MAS)	1118
40	Dayang Khairuniza (MAS)	1092
41	Tsai Hsin-yi (TPE)	1078
42	Sun Hongdou (CHN)	1077
43	Natthida Sertluecha (THA)	1056
44	Zoe Tam (HKG)	1036
45	Fatima Mohammad (KUW)	1013
46	Maryam Yousef (KUW)	991
47	Fatima Khalid Ali (BRN)	976
47	Tömörbaataryn Tuul (MGL)	976
49	Khalzangiin Ölziikhorol (MGL)	972
50	Layla Al-Janahi (BRN)	925
51	Shaikha Al-Hendi (KUW)	869
51	Noora Al-Janahi (BRN)	868
53	Altaf Karam (KUW)	857
54	Majeda Taher Saleh (BRN)	766

===== Knockout round =====
Quarterfinals		Semifinals		Gold medal match
Hwang Yeon-ju (KOR)	232
Krizziah Tabora (PHI)	194	Hwang Yeon-ju (KOR)	193
Chen Dongdong (CHN)	221	Chen Dongdong (CHN)	224
Zhang Yuhong (CHN)	184			Chen Dongdong (CHN)	167
Daphne Tan (SIN)	212			Daphne Tan (SIN)	182
Sharon Limansantoso (INA)	203	Daphne Tan (SIN)	255
Son Yun-hee (KOR)	245	Son Yun-hee (KOR)	223
Misaki Mukotani (JPN)	200

==== Doubles ====
3 July

===== Preliminary =====
Rank	Team	Score
1	South Korea (KOR); Lee Na-young; Jung Da-wun	2618
2	South Korea (KOR); Son Yun-hee; Hwang Yeon-ju	2532
3	Chinese Taipei (TPE); Huang Chiung-yao; Tsai Hsin-yi	2507
4	Singapore (SIN); Geraldine Ng; New Hui Fen	2442
5	Malaysia (MAS); Hee Kar Yen; Siti Safiyah	2420
6	Singapore (SIN); Bernice Lim; Daphne Tan	2366
7	Thailand (THA); Natthida Sertluecha; Angkana Netrviseth	2331
8	Chinese Taipei (TPE); Wang Ya-ting; Chang Yu-hsuan	2297
9	Japan (JPN); Natsuki Teshima; Haruka Matsuda	2287
10	Indonesia (INA); Tannya Roumimper; Sharon Limansantoso	2285
11	Japan (JPN); Misaki Mukotani; Hikaru Takekawa	2242
12	China (CHN); Sun Hongdou; Peng Rui	2239
13	Philippines (PHI); Krizziah Tabora; Liza del Rosario	2217
14	Philippines (PHI); Rachelle Leon; Liza Clutario	2190
15	Indonesia (INA); Novie Phang; Putty Armein	2171
16	Macau (MAC); Chan Weng Sam; Filomena Choi	2146
17	Hong Kong (HKG); Chan Shuk Han; Milki Ng	2141
18	China (CHN); Chen Dongdong; Zhang Yuhong	2121
19	Malaysia (MAS); Zatil Iman; Dayang Khairuniza	2119
19	Thailand (THA); Korngunya Aree; Tanaprang Sathean	2119
21	Hong Kong (HKG); Victoria Chan; Zoe Tam	2109
22	Macau (MAC); Hui Tong; Julia Lam	2064
23	Mongolia (MGL); Khalzangiin Ölziikhorol; Tömörbaataryn Tuul	1972
24	Kuwait (KUW); Shaikha Al-Hendi; Fatima Mohammad	1897
25	Bahrain (BRN); Noora Al-Janahi; Fatima Khalid Ali	1708
26	Kuwait (KUW); Altaf Karam; Maryam Yousef	1549
27	Bahrain (BRN); Layla Al-Janahi; Majeda Taher Saleh	1498

===== Knockout round =====
Quarterfinals		Semifinals		Gold medal match
Son Yun-hee (KOR); Hwang Yeon-ju (KOR)	389
Natthida Sertluecha (THA); Angkana Netrviseth (THA)	376	Son Yun-hee (KOR); Hwang Yeon-ju (KOR)	400
Lee Na-young (KOR); Jung Da-wun (KOR)	416	Wang Ya-ting (TPE); Chang Yu-hsuan (TPE)	378
Wang Ya-ting (TPE); Chang Yu-hsuan (TPE)	418			Son Yun-hee (KOR); Hwang Yeon-ju (KOR)	393
Geraldine Ng (SIN); New Hui Fen (SIN)	367			Bernice Lim (SIN); Daphne Tan (SIN)	441
Hee Kar Yen (MAS); Siti Safiyah (MAS)	362	Geraldine Ng (SIN); New Hui Fen (SIN)	357
Huang Chiung-yao (TPE); Tsai Hsin-yi (TPE)	352	Bernice Lim (SIN); Daphne Tan (SIN)	372
Bernice Lim (SIN); Daphne Tan (SIN)	409

==== Team of 4 ====
===== Preliminary =====
4–5 July

Rank	Team	Score
1	South Korea (KOR)	5266
2	Japan (JPN)	4830
3	Malaysia (MAS)	4747
4	Chinese Taipei (TPE)	4738
5	China (CHN)	4686
6	Indonesia (INA)	4675
7	Thailand (THA)	4613
8	Singapore (SIN)	4583
9	Philippines (PHI)	4474
10	Hong Kong (HKG)	4344
11	Macau (MAC)	4174
12	Kuwait (KUW)	3877
13	Bahrain (BRN)	3474

===== Knockout round =====
6 July

Semifinals		Gold medal match
South Korea	771
Chinese Taipei	812	Chinese Taipei	845
Japan	747	Malaysia	734
Malaysia	862
