= Dancesport at the 2013 Asian Indoor and Martial Arts Games =

- Venue: Samsan World Gymnasium
- Dates: 4–5 July 2013

Dancesport for the 2013 Asian Indoor and Martial Arts Games was held at the Incheon Samsan World Gymnasium. It took place on the 4 and 5 July 2013.

== Medalists ==
=== Standard ===
Event	Gold	Silver	Bronze
Five dances	China; Zhao Peng; Wang Qi	Kazakhstan; Vladlen Kravchenko; Aigerim Toktarova	South Korea; Kim Dong-soo; Lee Min-joo
Quickstep	Kazakhstan; Vladlen Kravchenko; Aigerim Toktarova	South Korea; Park Seong-woo; Jo Su-bin	Vietnam; Nguyễn Hải Anh; Nguyễn Trọng Nhã Uyên
Slow foxtrot	China; Zhang Zhanhua; Zhang Ruonan	South Korea; Hwang Yong-ha; Song Hye-ri	Kazakhstan; Sergey Popov; Marina Laptiyeva
Tango	China; Zhao Peng; Wang Qi	South Korea; Hwang Yong-ha; Song Hye-ri	Vietnam; Nguyễn Hải Anh; Nguyễn Trọng Nhã Uyên
Waltz	China; Zhang Zhanhua; Zhang Ruonan	South Korea; Park Seong-woo; Jo Su-bin	Kazakhstan; Sergey Popov; Marina Laptiyeva

=== Latin ===
Event	Gold	Silver	Bronze
Five dances	China; Hou Yao; Zhuang Ting	Kazakhstan; Maxim Antipin; Veronika Popova	Philippines; Gerald Jamili; Cherry Clarice Parcon
Cha-cha-cha	China; Hou Yao; Zhuang Ting	South Korea; Nam Gi-yong; Lee Da-jung	Japan; Yuki Suzuki; Ayaka Harada
Jive	Philippines; Gerald Jamili; Cherry Clarice Parcon	South Korea; Jang Se-jin; Lee Hae-in	Japan; Yumiya Kubota; Rara Kubota
Paso doble	Hong Kong; Chan Hing Wai; Tin Lai Ki	South Korea; Jang Se-jin; Lee Hae-in	Kyrgyzstan; Aleksei Kibkalo; Tatiana Kogadei
Samba	South Korea; Nam Gi-yong; Lee Da-jung	Kazakhstan; Maxim Antipin; Veronika Popova	Thailand; Shinawat Lerson; Krittaporn Manasuth

== Medal table ==
Rank	Nation	Gold	Silver	Bronze	Total
1	China (CHN)	6	0	0	6
2	South Korea (KOR)	1	7	1	9
3	Kazakhstan (KAZ)	1	3	2	6
4	Philippines (PHI)	1	0	1	2
5	Hong Kong (HKG)	1	0	0	1
6	Japan (JPN)	0	0	2	2
6	Vietnam (VIE)	0	0	2	2
8	Kyrgyzstan (KGZ)	0	0	1	1
8	Thailand (THA)	0	0	1	1
Totals (9 entries)		10	10	10	30

== Results ==
=== Standard ===
==== Five dances ====
5 July

Rank	Team	SF	Final
1st place, gold medalist(s)	Zhao Peng / Wang Qi (CHN)	45	218.57
2nd place, silver medalist(s)	Vladlen Kravchenko / Aigerim Toktarova (KAZ)	45	215.18
3rd place, bronze medalist(s)	Kim Dong-soo / Lee Min-joo (KOR)	45	213.29
4	Masayuki Ishihara / Saori Ito (JPN)	45	208.96
5	German Enriquez / Danella Publico (PHI)	44	187.92
6	Lin Li / Chen Ya-yen (TPE)	43	178.20
7	Johnston Lim / Nicole Tan (MAS)	3	
8	Frans Satya Wijaya / Nadia Lutvina Wijaya (INA)	0	

==== Quickstep ====
4 July

Rank	Team	SF	Final
1st place, gold medalist(s)	Vladlen Kravchenko / Aigerim Toktarova (KAZ)	9	43.13
2nd place, silver medalist(s)	Park Seong-woo / Jo Su-bin (KOR)	9	41.59
3rd place, bronze medalist(s)	Nguyễn Hải Anh / Nguyễn Trọng Nhã Uyên (VIE)	6	39.72
4	Minato Kojima / Megumi Morita (JPN)	8	39.44
5	Atis Horthong / Chanikarn Kallayawanich (THA)	5	37.79
6	Lin Li / Chen Ya-yen (TPE)	5	37.00
7	Maksim Suslikov / Kristina Belikova (KGZ)	5	36.43
8	Tristan Ducay / Willanne Ducay (PHI)	7	35.99

==== Slow foxtrot ====
4 July

Rank	Team	SF	Final
1st place, gold medalist(s)	Zhang Zhanhua / Zhang Ruonan (CHN)	9	43.21
2nd place, silver medalist(s)	Hwang Yong-ha / Song Hye-ri (KOR)	9	42.29
3rd place, bronze medalist(s)	Sergey Popov / Marina Laptiyeva (KAZ)	8	41.59
4	Masayuki Ishihara / Saori Ito (JPN)	8	41.36
5	German Enriquez / Danella Publico (PHI)	5	37.57
6	Apichai Promboon / Pakaorn Kuituan (THA)	9	37.01
7	Maksim Suslikov / Kristina Belikova (KGZ)	3	
8	Phan Hồng Việt / Hoàng Thu Trang (VIE)	2	
9	Tan Kay Leong / Schlaine Wong (MAS)	1	
10	Ieong Su Kan / Wong Sut Kuai (MAC)	0	

==== Tango ====
4 July

Rank	Team	SF	Final
1st place, gold medalist(s)	Zhao Peng / Wang Qi (CHN)	9	41.73
2nd place, silver medalist(s)	Hwang Yong-ha / Song Hye-ri (KOR)	9	40.70
3rd place, bronze medalist(s)	Nguyễn Hải Anh / Nguyễn Trọng Nhã Uyên (VIE)	9	39.43
4	Minato Kojima / Megumi Morita (JPN)	9	37.85
5	Apichai Promboon / Pakaorn Kuituan (THA)	9	37.08
6	Tristan Ducay / Willanne Ducay (PHI)	7	33.93
7	Ermek Barktabasov / Sabina Aidarkulova (KGZ)	2	
8	Tan Kay Leong / Schlaine Wong (MAS)	0	
8	Frans Satya Wijaya / Nadia Lutvina Wijaya (INA)	0	

==== Waltz ====
4 July

Rank	Team	SF	Final
1st place, gold medalist(s)	Zhang Zhanhua / Zhang Ruonan (CHN)	9	43.13
2nd place, silver medalist(s)	Park Seong-woo / Jo Su-bin (KOR)	9	42.85
3rd place, bronze medalist(s)	Sergey Popov / Marina Laptiyeva (KAZ)	9	40.43
4	Atis Horthong / Chanikarn Kallayawanich (THA)	9	35.94
5	Johnston Lim / Nicole Tan (MAS)	8	34.07
6	Ermek Barktabasov / Sabina Aidarkulova (KGZ)	7	32.22
7	Phan Hồng Việt / Hoàng Thu Trang (VIE)	3	
8	Ieong Su Kan / Wong Sut Kuai (MAC)	0	

=== Latin ===
==== Five dances ====
4 July

Rank	Team	SF	Final
1st place, gold medalist(s)	Hou Yao / Zhuang Ting (CHN)	44	215.41
2nd place, silver medalist(s)	Maxim Antipin / Veronika Popova (KAZ)	43	210.04
3rd place, bronze medalist(s)	Gerald Jamili / Cherry Clarice Parcon (PHI)	40	204.49
4	Yumiya Kubota / Rara Kubota (JPN)	41	202.96
5	Aleksei Kibkalo / Tatiana Kogadei (KGZ)	40	200.14
6	Lee Gyu-won / Kim Ga-yeong (KOR)	38	196.87
7	Wong Tong Lam / Ng Ieng Mei (MAC)	19	
8	Vernon Choo / Elie Cheah (MAS)	4	
9	Peng Yen-ming / Chi Hsin-chi (TPE)	1	
10	Assadour Euredjian / Sandra Abbas (LIB)	0	

==== Cha-cha-cha ====
5 July

Rank	Team	QF	SF	Final
1st place, gold medalist(s)	Hou Yao / Zhuang Ting (CHN)	9	9	43.34
2nd place, silver medalist(s)	Nam Gi-yong / Lee Da-jung (KOR)	9	9	43.21
3rd place, bronze medalist(s)	Yuki Suzuki / Ayaka Harada (JPN)	9	4	40.42
4	Michael Angelo Marquez / Stephanie Sabalo (PHI)	9	5	40.35
4	Shinawat Lerson / Krittaporn Manasuth (THA)	9	7	40.35
6	Ayan Zhumatayev / Liya Kazbekova (KAZ)	9	7	40.07
7	Fong Wai Kin / U Mei Kok (MAC)	5	3	
7	Farukhdzhan Mamadzhanov / Ramina Bikbaeva (KGZ)	8	3	
7	Ng Sum Chun / Lam Wai Yi (HKG)	9	3	
10	Nguyễn Đoàn Minh Trường / Hoàng Mỹ An (VIE)	8	2	
11	Peng Yen-ming / Chi Hsin-chi (TPE)	7	1	
11	Albert Yuwono / Ratu Nurchoiriah (INA)	5	1	
13	Shaun Low / Pearly Low (MAS)	6	0	
14	Sean Mahendren / Gan Pin (SIN)	4		
15	Jimmy Kantar / Stephanie Sader (LIB)	2		

==== Jive ====
5 July

Rank	Team	SF	Final
1st place, gold medalist(s)	Gerald Jamili / Cherry Clarice Parcon (PHI)	9	42.15
2nd place, silver medalist(s)	Jang Se-jin / Lee Hae-in (KOR)	9	41.72
3rd place, bronze medalist(s)	Yumiya Kubota / Rara Kubota (JPN)	9	40.14
4	Ayan Zhumatayev / Liya Kazbekova (KAZ)	6	38.92
5	Nguyễn Đoàn Minh Trường / Hoàng Mỹ An (VIE)	4	38.35
6	Puttisit Promna / Nattanicha Ittisophonpisarn (THA)	7	37.92
7	Ng Sum Chun / Lam Wai Yi (HKG)	4	37.36
8	Vernon Choo / Elie Cheah (MAS)	3	
8	Fong Wai Kin / U Mei Kok (MAC)	3	
10	Jimmy Kantar / Stephanie Sader (LIB)	0	
10	Sean Mahendren / Gan Pin (SIN)	0	

==== Paso doble ====
5 July

Rank	Team	SF	Final
1st place, gold medalist(s)	Chan Hing Wai / Tin Lai Ki (HKG)	7	41.35
2nd place, silver medalist(s)	Jang Se-jin / Lee Hae-in (KOR)	9	41.06
3rd place, bronze medalist(s)	Aleksei Kibkalo / Tatiana Kogadei (KGZ)	9	40.85
4	Michael Angelo Marquez / Stephanie Sabalo (PHI)	7	39.44
5	Puttisit Promna / Nattanicha Ittisophonpisarn (THA)	7	37.71
6	Ngô Minh Đức / Đặng Thu Hương (VIE)	7	37.64
7	Yan Bangbang / Zhu Jing (CHN)	6	
8	Lam Chi Tong / Pun Wun (MAC)	2	
9	Albert Yuwono / Ratu Nurchoiriah (INA)	0	

==== Samba ====
5 July

Rank	Team	SF	Final
1st place, gold medalist(s)	Nam Gi-yong / Lee Da-jung (KOR)	9	42.99
2nd place, silver medalist(s)	Maxim Antipin / Veronika Popova (KAZ)	9	40.99
3rd place, bronze medalist(s)	Shinawat Lerson / Krittaporn Manasuth (THA)	6	40.28
4	Chan Hing Wai / Tin Lai Ki (HKG)	6	40.21
5	Yan Bangbang / Zhu Jing (CHN)	8	39.23
6	Yuki Suzuki / Ayaka Harada (JPN)	7	39.16
7	Ngô Minh Đức / Đặng Thu Hương (VIE)	4	
8	Lam Chi Tong / Pun Wun (MAC)	2	
8	Farukhdzhan Mamadzhanov / Ramina Bikbaeva (KGZ)	2	
10	Shaun Low / Pearly Low (MAS)	1	
