= Go at the 2013 Asian Indoor and Martial Arts Games =

- Venue: Yonsei University
- Dates: 30 June – 5 July 2013

Go, known as baduk (바둑) in Korea, for the 2013 Asian Indoor and Martial Arts Games, was held at the Yonsei Global University Campus. It took place from 30 June to 5 July 2013. It was also this event's debut at these Games. Before that Go was part of the 2010 Asian Games at Guangzhou.

== Medalists ==
Event	Gold	Silver	Bronze
Men's individual	Tang Weixing; China	Byun Sang-il; South Korea	Tan Xiao; China
Men's individual	Tang Weixing; China	Byun Sang-il; South Korea	Lee Dong-hun; South Korea
Men's team	South Korea; Byun Sang-il; Kang Seung-min; Lee Dong-hun; Na Hyun	China; Mi Yuting; Peng Liyao; Tan Xiao; Tang Weixing	Chinese Taipei; Chen Shih-yuan; Chou Chun-hsun; Hsiao Cheng-hao; Lin Chih-han
Men's team	South Korea; Byun Sang-il; Kang Seung-min; Lee Dong-hun; Na Hyun	China; Mi Yuting; Peng Liyao; Tan Xiao; Tang Weixing	Japan; Tomoya Hirata; Katsuya Motoki; Atsushi Sada; Kazushi Tsuruta
Women's team	China; Gao Xing; Wang Shuang; Yu Zhiying; Zhang Peipei	South Korea; Choi Jeong; Kim Chae-young; Oh Jeong-a; Oh Yu-jin	Chinese Taipei; Chang Cheng-ping; Chang Kai-hsin; Joanne Missingham; Su Sheng-fang
Women's team	China; Gao Xing; Wang Shuang; Yu Zhiying; Zhang Peipei	South Korea; Choi Jeong; Kim Chae-young; Oh Jeong-a; Oh Yu-jin	Thailand; Pattraporn Aroonphaichitra; Juthamate Jaruratchataphun; Aroonkorn Prathoomwan; Ribakah Wongchugaew
Mixed pair	China; Peng Liyao; Gao Xing	South Korea; Na Hyun; Choi Jeong	South Korea; Kang Seung-min; Oh Jeong-a
Mixed pair	China; Peng Liyao; Gao Xing	South Korea; Na Hyun; Choi Jeong	China; Mi Yuting; Yu Zhiying

== Medal table ==
Rank	Nation	Gold	Silver	Bronze	Total
1	China (CHN)	3	1	2	6
2	South Korea (KOR)	1	3	2	6
3	Chinese Taipei (TPE)	0	0	2	2
4	Japan (JPN)	0	0	1	1
4	Thailand (THA)	0	0	1	1
Totals (5 entries)		4	4	8	16

== Results ==
=== Men's individual ===
==== Swiss round ====
30 June – 1 July

Rank	Athlete	R1	R2	R3	R4	R5	Pts	SOS
1	Tan Xiao (CHN)	MAC1; 2	TPE2; 2	HKG1; 2	KOR1; 2	CHN2; 2	10	32
2	Lee Dong-hun (KOR)	THA2; 2	JPN1; 2	JPN2; 2	CHN1; 0	TPE1; 2	8	30
3	Tang Weixing (CHN)	MAC2; 2	THA1; 2	KOR2; 2	JPN2; 2	CHN1; 0	8	28
4	Byun Sang-il (KOR)	MGL2; 2	TPE1; 2	CHN2; 0	JPN1; 2	HKG1; 2	8	26
5	Hsiao Cheng-hao (TPE)	HKG2; 2	KOR2; 0	TPE2; 2	THA1; 2	KOR1; 0	6	32
6	Chen Shih-yuan (TPE)	VIE1; 2	CHN1; 0	TPE1; 0	HKG2; 2	THA1; 2	6	30
7	Atsushi Sada (JPN)	SIN1; 2	KOR1; 0	VIE2; 2	KOR2; 0	JPN2; 2	6	30
8	Chan Nai San (HKG)	MAS2; 2	MGL1; 2	CHN1; 0	SIN2; 2	KOR2; 0	6	28
9	Chan Chi Hin (HKG)	TPE1; 0	MAS1; 2	VIE1; 2	TPE2; 0	MAC1; 2	6	24
10	Zhang Xiang (SIN)	JPN1; 0	VIE1; 0	MAS1; 2	MAC2; 2	THA2; 2	6	20
11	Goh Rong Yao (SIN)	JPN2; 0	MAC2; 2	MGL1; 2	HKG1; 0	VIE1; 2	6	18
12	Kazushi Tsuruta (JPN)	SIN2; 2	MAS2; 2	KOR1; 0	CHN2; 0	JPN1; 0	4	30
13	Purepun Punuerai (THA)	VIE2; 2	CHN2; 0	MAC1; 2	TPE1; 0	TPE2; 0	4	28
14	Đỗ Khánh Bình (VIE)	TPE2; 0	SIN1; 2	HKG2; 0	MGL1; 2	SIN2; 0	4	26
15	Lam Hin Chan (MAC)	CHN1; 0	MGL2; 2	THA1; 0	VIE2; 2	HKG2; 0	4	24
16	Srisin Chotikapong (THA)	KOR1; 0	VIE2; 0	MAC2; 2	MAS2; 2	SIN1; 0	4	22
17	Lê Mai Duy (VIE)	THA1; 0	THA2; 2	JPN1; 0	MAC1; 0	MGL1; 2	4	20
18	Koh Song Sang (MAS)	MGL1; 0	HKG2; 0	SIN1; 0	MGL2; 2	MAS2; 2	4	16
19	Tsendjavyn Oyuutbileg (MGL)	MAS1; 2	HKG1; 0	SIN2; 0	VIE1; 0	VIE2; 0	2	24
19	Chan Kuok Wang (MAC)	CHN2; 0	SIN2; 0	THA2; 0	SIN1; 0	MGL2; 2	2	24
21	Cheng Khai Yong (MAS)	HKG1; 0	JPN2; 0	MGL2; 2	THA2; 0	MAS1; 0	2	18
22	Agvaandondovyn Demberelnyambuu (MGL)	KOR2; 0	MAC1; 0	MAS2; 0	MAS1; 0	MAC2; 0	0	20

==== Knockout round ====
2 July

Semifinals		Gold medal match
Tan Xiao (CHN)	0
Byun Sang-il (KOR)	2	Byun Sang-il (KOR)	0
Lee Dong-hun (KOR)	0	Tang Weixing (CHN)	2
Tang Weixing (CHN)	2

=== Men's team ===
==== Swiss round ====
3–4 July

Rank	Team	R1	R2	R3	R4	MP	GP
1	China (CHN)	JPN; 6–0	TPE; 6–0	KOR; 4–2	THA; 6–0	8	22
2	South Korea (KOR)	THA; 6–0	SIN; 6–0	CHN; 2–4	TPE; 4–2	6	18
3	Japan (JPN)	CHN; 0–6	HKG; 4–2	MGL; 6–0	SIN; 6–0	6	16
4	Chinese Taipei (TPE)	HKG; 6–0	CHN; 0–6	MAC; 6–0	KOR; 2–4	4	14
5	Hong Kong (HKG)	TPE; 0–6	JPN; 2–4	MAS; 6–0	MAC; 6–0	4	14
6	Thailand (THA)	KOR; 0–6	MGL; 6–0	SIN; 4–2	CHN; 0–6	4	10
7	Singapore (SIN)	MAC; 6–0	KOR; 0–6	THA; 2–4	JPN; 0–6	2	8
8	Malaysia (MAS)	MGL; 2–4	MAC; 0–6	HKG; 0–6	MGL; 4–2	2	6
9	Macau (MAC)	SIN; 0–6	MAS; 6–0	TPE; 0–6	HKG; 0–6	2	6
10	Mongolia (MGL)	MAS; 4–2	THA; 0–6	JPN; 0–6	MAS; 2–4	2	6

- After the 4th round, two teams tied as the 4th place in the team score and individual scores. Therefore, the fourth place was determined by an extra match between them. The winning team Chinese Taipei was advanced to the second phase as the 4th place.

==== Knockout round ====
5 July

Semifinals		Gold medal match
China	6
Chinese Taipei	0	China	2
South Korea	4	South Korea	4
Japan	2

=== Women's team ===
==== Swiss round ====
3–4 July

Rank	Team	R1	R2	R3	R4	MP	GP
1	China (CHN)	KOR; 4–2	THA; 6–0	TPE; 4–2	SIN; 6–0	8	20
2	South Korea (KOR)	CHN; 2–4	SIN; 6–0	VIE; 6–0	TPE; 6–0	6	20
3	Thailand (THA)	SIN; 4–2	CHN; 0–6	MAS; 4–2	VIE; 4–2	6	12
4	Chinese Taipei (TPE)	MGL; 6–0	VIE; 6–0	CHN; 2–4	KOR; 0–6	4	14
5	Malaysia (MAS)	VIE; 0–6	MGL; 4–2	THA; 2–4	MGL; 4–2	4	10
6	Vietnam (VIE)	MAS; 6–0	TPE; 0–6	KOR; 0–6	THA; 2–4	2	8
7	Singapore (SIN)	THA; 2–4	KOR; 0–6	MGL; 4–2	CHN; 0–6	2	6
8	Mongolia (MGL)	TPE; 0–6	MAS; 2–4	SIN; 2–4	MAS; 2–4	0	6

==== Knockout round ====
5 July

Semifinals		Gold medal match
China	4
Chinese Taipei	2	China	4
South Korea	6	South Korea	2
Thailand	0

=== Mixed pair ===
==== Swiss round ====
30 June – 1 July

Rank	Team	R1	R2	R3	R4	R5	Pts	SOS
1	Kang Seung-min (KOR); Oh Jeong-a (KOR)	MGL1; 2	CHN2; 2	JPN1; 2	CHN1; 2	KOR2; 0	8	34
2	Mi Yuting (CHN); Yu Zhiying (CHN)	THA1; 2	TPE2; 2	HKG1; 2	KOR1; 0	JPN1; 2	8	32
3	Peng Liyao (CHN); Gao Xing (CHN)	MAS2; 2	KOR1; 0	SIN1; 2	HKG1; 2	TPE2; 2	8	26
4	Na Hyun (KOR); Choi Jeong (KOR)	MAC1; 2	THA2; 2	TPE1; 2	JPN1; 0	KOR1; 2	8	24
5	Katsuya Motoki (JPN); Rina Fujisawa (JPN)	SIN1; 2	TPE1; 2	KOR1; 0	KOR2; 2	CHN1; 0	6	34
6	Yang Shi Hai (HKG); Kan Ying (HKG)	THA2; 2	SIN2; 2	CHN1; 0	CHN2; 0	JPN2; 2	6	28
7	Lin Chih-han (TPE); Joanne Missingham (TPE)	JPN2; 2	JPN1; 0	KOR2; 0	MGL1; 2	SIN2; 2	6	28
8	Chou Chun-hsun (TPE); Chang Kai-hsin (TPE)	MGL2; 2	CHN1; 0	MAS2; 2	SIN2; 2	CHN2; 0	6	22
9	Tomoya Hirata (JPN); Aya Okuda (JPN)	TPE1; 0	MAS1; 2	THA2; 2	SIN1; 2	HKG1; 0	6	22
10	Nuttakrit Taechaamnuayvit (THA); Pattraporn Aroonphaichitra (THA)	CHN1; 0	SIN1; 0	MAC1; 2	MAS2; 2	THA2; 2	6	18
11	Kwa Jie Hui (SIN); Ho Li Ting (SIN)	JPN1; 0	THA1; 2	CHN2; 0	JPN2; 0	MAS2; 2	4	28
12	Tan Jia Cheng (SIN); Karen Pooh (SIN)	MAS1; 2	HKG1; 0	MGL1; 2	TPE2; 0	TPE1; 0	4	26
13	Tsolmongiin Sansar (MGL); Ravjiryn Tungalag (MGL)	KOR1; 0	MGL2; 2	SIN2; 0	TPE1; 0	MAC1; 2	4	20
14	Ho Hock Doong (MAS); Fong Sok Nee (MAS)	SIN2; 0	JPN2; 0	MGL2; 2	THA2; 0	MGL2; 2	4	12
15	Pariwat Sampaokaew (THA); Aroonkorn Prathoomwan (THA)	HKG1; 0	KOR2; 0	JPN2; 0	MAS1; 2	THA1; 0	2	30
16	Zaid Zulkifli (MAS); Suzanne Low (MAS)	CHN2; 0	MAC1; 2	TPE2; 0	THA1; 0	SIN1; 0	2	26
17	Sam In Hang (MAC); Fu Soi Ieng (MAC)	KOR2; 0	MAS2; 0	THA1; 0	MGL2; 2	MGL1; 0	2	20
18	Bataagiin Temüüjin (MGL); Mönkh-Erdeniin Uuganbat (MGL)	TPE2; 0	MGL1; 0	MAS1; 0	MAC1; 0	MAS1; 0	0	20

==== Knockout round ====
2 July

Semifinals		Gold medal match
Kang Seung-min (KOR); Oh Jeong-a (KOR)	0
Na Hyun (KOR); Choi Jeong (KOR)	2	Na Hyun (KOR); Choi Jeong (KOR)	0
Mi Yuting (CHN); Yu Zhiying (CHN)	0	Peng Liyao (CHN); Gao Xing (CHN)	2
Peng Liyao (CHN); Gao Xing (CHN)	2
