= Thailand at the 2013 Asian Indoor and Martial Arts Games =

- IOC code: THA
- NOC: National Olympic Committee of Thailand
- Website: www.olympicthai.or.th/eng (in English and Thai)

in Incheon
- Medals Ranked 4th: Gold 8 Silver 3 Bronze 11 Total 22

Asian Indoor and Martial Arts Games appearances
- 2005; 2007; 2009; 2013; 2017; 2021; 2026

Thailand competed at the 2013 Asian Indoor and Martial Arts Games in Incheon, South Korea from June 29, 2013 to July 6, 2013. Thailand finished with a total of 8 gold medals, 3 silver medals, and 11 bronze medals.

== Medal summary ==
=== Medals table ===
Medals by sport
Sport	Gold	Silver	Bronze	Total
Muay	4	1	0	5
Short course swimming	2	2	3	7
Cue sports	2	0	0	2
Futsal	0	0	2	2
Indoor kabaddi	0	0	2	2
Go	0	0	1	1
Bowling	0	0	1	1
Dancesport	0	0	1	1
Kurash	0	0	1	1
Total	8	3	11	22

=== Medalists ===
Medal	Name	Sport	Event
Gold	Praprut Chaithanasakun	Cue sports	Men's English billiards singles
Gold	Amornrat Uamduang	Cue sports	Women's Six-red snooker singles
Gold	Supachai Pansuwan	Muay	Men's Welterweight 63.5–67 kg
Gold	Armin Matli	Muay	Men's Light middleweight 67–71 kg
Gold	Ruchira Wongsriwo	Muay	Women's Flyweight 48–51 kg
Gold	Ratchadaphon Wihantamma	Muay	Women's Bantamweight 51–54 kg
Gold	Jenjira Srisaard	Short course swimming	Women's 50 m freestyle
Gold	Jenjira Srisaard; Nichapat Kaewpongmongkol; Benjaporn Sriphanomthorn; Natthanan Junkrajang; Pusanisa Sangplong	Short course swimming	Women's 4x50 m freestyle relay
Silver	Radomyos Matjiur	Short course swimming	Men's 100 m individual medley
Silver	Natthanan Junkrajang; Jenjira Srisaard; Nichapat Kaewpongmongkol; Benjaporn Sriphanomthorn	Short course swimming	Women's 4 × 100 m freestyle relay
Silver	Piyapan Chinanat	Muay	Men's Middleweight 71–75 kg
Bronze	Yannaphon Larpapharat	Bowling	Men's Singles
Bronze	Shinawat Lerson; Krittaporn Manasuth	Dancesport	Samba
Bronze	Thailand	Futsal	Men's Team
Bronze	Thailand	Futsal	Women's Team
Bronze	Pattraporn Aroonphaichitra; Juthamate Jaruratchataphun; Aroonkorn Prathoomwan; Ribakah Wongchugaew	Go	Women's Team
Bronze	Thailand	Indoor kabaddi	Men's Team
Bronze	Thailand	Indoor kabaddi	Women's Team
Bronze	Petlada Nuinkaew	Kurash	Women's Lightweight −57 kg
Bronze	Natthanan Junkrajang	Short course swimming	Women's 100 m freestyle
Bronze	Natthanan Junkrajang	Short course swimming	Women's 200 m freestyle
Bronze	Natthanan Junkrajang	Short course swimming	Women's 200 m individual medley
