= 2013 Asian Indoor and Martial Arts Games =

Martial arts competition

IV Asian Indoor and Martial Arts Games
- Host city: Incheon, South Korea
- Motto: Diversity Shines Here (평화의 숨결, 아시아의 미래)
- Nations: 43
- Athletes: 1,652
- Events: 100 in 12 sports
- Opening: 29 June 2013
- Closing: 6 July 2013
- Opened by: Chung Hong-won; Prime Minister of South Korea
- Torch lighter: Cha Yu-Ram
- Main venue: Samsan World Gymnasium
- Website: aimag2013.org

The 2013 Asian Indoor and Martial Arts Games (Korean: 2013년 실내 무도 아시아 경기대회 or 2013년 실내 무도 아시안 게임), officially 4th Asian Indoor and Martial Arts Games (제4회 실내 무도 아시아 경기대회 or 제4회 실내 무도 아시안 게임) and also known as Incheon 2013 (인천 2013), was a pan-continental event held in Incheon, South Korea from 29 June to 6 July 2013 that served as a dress-rehearsal for the upcoming 2014 Asian Games, which was also held in the same city. It was the first event to be held under the "Asian Indoor and Martial Arts Games" name following the merger of two OCA events – Asian Indoor Games and Asian Martial Arts Games, inherited the edition numeral of the former. Doha, Qatar was initially scheduled to host the 4th Asian Indoor Games in 2011, but withdrawn in June 2008 due to "unforeseen circumstances", with the Olympic Council of Asia (OCA) chose Incheon instead as a replacement and postponed the games to 2013.

== Marketing ==
The logo of the Games is a brush image of a Korean traditional 'Giwa' (Tile) Roof that resembles people – “人” (Hanja or Chinese character for "인" (In)) holding hands, the initial of Asia “A”, and the Incheon Bridge. The wordmark ‘incheon 2013’ under the roof resembles the athletes from countries of the region that compete in various sports of the games. Similar to the Asian Games, the event's mascots were three spotted seals named Barame, Chumuro, and Vichuan and the event's motto was Diversity Shines Here. (See 2014 Asian Games#Marketing)

== Venues ==
Nine different venues were used for these Games: Most of the following would also be used for the 2014 Asian Games.

- Incheon Samsan World Gymnasium – opening and closing ceremonies, dancesport and esports
- Anyang Hogye Gymnasium – bowling
- Songdo Global University Campus and Dongbu Student Gymnasium – futsal
- Sangnoksu Gymnasium – kabaddi and kurash
- Dowon Aquatics Center – short-course (25m) swimming
- Songdo Convensia – cue sports (billiard sports)
- Yonsei International Campus – chess and baduk (Go)
- Dowon Gymnasium – kickboxing and muaythai

== Participating nations ==
All 45 member countries of the Olympic Council of Asia were invited to compete at these Games, with only 43 OCA countries taking pare in the 2013 games. North Korea and Timor-Leste declined to send their athletes to these Games. Indian athletes participated the Games under the Olympic flag because the Indian Olympic Association was suspended.

- Afghanistan (21)
- Bahrain (15)
- Bangladesh (5)
- Bhutan (12)
- Brunei (3)
- Cambodia (2)
- China (102)
- Chinese Taipei (76)
- Hong Kong (67)
- Independent Olympic Athletes (56)
- Indonesia (76)
- Iran (82)
- Iraq (26)
- Japan (83)
- Jordan (9)
- Kazakhstan (51)
- Kuwait (40)
- Kyrgyzstan (23)
- Laos (4)
- Lebanon (26)
- Macau (53)
- Malaysia (63)
- Maldives (12)
- Mongolia (54)
- Myanmar (6)
- Nepal (6)
- Oman (11)
- Pakistan (8)
- Palestine (19)
- Philippines (40)
- Qatar (33)
- Saudi Arabia (21)
- Singapore (28)
- South Korea (121)
- Sri Lanka (6)
- Syria (17)
- Tajikistan (17)
- Thailand (116)
- Turkmenistan (50)
- United Arab Emirates (33)
- Uzbekistan (52)
- Vietnam (99)
- Yemen (8)

== Sports ==
A total of twelve sports were approved for the 2013 Asian Indoor and Martial Arts Games.

- Bowling (6)
- Chess (4)
- Cue sports (10)
- Dancesport (10)
- Esports (6)
- Futsal (2)
- Go (4)
- Indoor kabaddi (2)
- Kickboxing (9)
- Kurash (8)
- Muaythai (9)
- Short course swimming (30)

== Calendar ==
OC	Opening ceremony	●	Event competitions	1	Event finals	CC	Closing ceremony

June / July 2013	26th Wed	27th Thu	28th Fri	29th Sat	30th Sun	1st Mon	2nd Tue	3rd Wed	4th Thu	5th Fri	6th Sat	Gold medals
Ceremonies				OC							CC	
Bowling					1	1	1	1	●	●	2	6
Chess					●	●	●	2	●	1	1	4
Cue sports				●	●	2	3	●	2	1	2	10
Dancesport									5	5		10
Esports				●	●	3	3					6
Futsal	●	●	●	●	●	●		●	●	1	1	2
Go					●	●	2	●	●	2		4
Indoor kabaddi				●	●	●	●	2				2
Kickboxing								●	●	2	7	9
Kurash									3	3	2	8
Muaythai				●	●	●	9					9
Short course swimming					8	7	8	7				30
Total gold medals					9	13	26	12	10	15	15	100
June / July 2013	26th Wed	27th Thu	28th Fri	29th Sat	30th Sun	1st Mon	2nd Tue	3rd Wed	4th Thu	5th Fri	6th Sat	Gold medals

== Medal table ==
* Host nation (South Korea)

Rank	Nation	Gold	Silver	Bronze	Total
1	China (CHN)	29	13	10	52
2	South Korea (KOR)*	22	26	22	70
3	Vietnam (VIE)	8	7	12	27
4	Thailand (THA)	8	3	11	22
5	Kazakhstan (KAZ)	7	8	16	31
6	Iran (IRI)	3	6	2	11
7	Chinese Taipei (TPE)	3	5	12	20
8	Hong Kong (HKG)	3	4	10	17
9	Japan (JPN)	3	4	8	15
10	Uzbekistan (UZB)	3	4	3	10
11	Turkmenistan (TKM)	2	4	1	7
12	Independent Olympic Athletes (AOI)	2	3	5	10
13	Singapore (SIN)	2	0	3	5
14	Kyrgyzstan (KGZ)	1	2	3	6
15	Tajikistan (TJK)	1	2	1	4
16	Mongolia (MGL)	1	1	2	4
17	Iraq (IRQ)	1	0	3	4
18	Philippines (PHI)	1	0	2	3
19	Indonesia (INA)	0	2	3	5
19	Jordan (JOR)	0	2	3	5
21	Kuwait (KUW)	0	2	0	2
22	Malaysia (MAS)	0	1	2	3
22	United Arab Emirates (UAE)	0	1	2	3
24	Laos (LAO)	0	1	1	2
25	Afghanistan (AFG)	0	0	3	3
25	Myanmar (MYA)	0	0	3	3
25	Syria (SYR)	0	0	3	3
28	Lebanon (LIB)	0	0	2	2
29	Palestine (PLE)	0	0	1	1
29	Qatar (QAT)	0	0	1	1
Totals (30 entries)		100	101	150	351

== Doping ==
What follows is a list of all the athletes that have tested positive for a banned substance during the Games. Any medals listed were revoked.

Name	NOC	Sport	Banned substance	Medals	Ref
Zhadyra Kuanysheva	Kazakhstan	Kickboxing	Furosemide		
Jarah Theweni	Kuwait	Kickboxing	Amiloride and Hydrochlorothiazide		
Mastaneh Seifabadi	Iran	Muaythai	Drostanolone		
Indra Gunawan	Indonesia	Short course swimming	Methylhexanamine	(gold) (Men's 50 m breaststroke)	
Guntur Pratama Putera	Indonesia	Short course swimming	Methylhexanamine	(silver) (Men's 4 × 50 m freestyle relay); (bronze) (Men's 4 × 100 m freestyle relay)	

Preceded by Asian Indoor Games; Asian Martial Arts Games	Asian Indoor and Martial Arts Games; Incheon; IV Asian Indoor and Martial Arts Games (2013)	Succeeded by Ashgabat
