= Japan at the 2013 Asian Indoor and Martial Arts Games =

- IOC code: JPN
- NOC: Japanese Olympic Committee
- Website: www.joc.or.jp

in Incheon, South Korea June 29 - July 6
- Competitors: 82 in 8 sports
- Medals Ranked 9th: Gold 3 Silver 4 Bronze 8 Total 15

Asian Indoor and Martial Arts Games appearances
- 2005; 2007; 2009; 2013; 2017; 2021; 2026

Japan competed at the 2013 Asian Indoor and Martial Arts Games held in Incheon, South Korea from June 29 to July 6. Japan sent a delegation consisting of 82 competitors for the event. Japan won a total of 15 medals in the event consisting of 3 gold medals, 4 silver medals, and 8 bronze medals. Kota Eto won a gold in men's kurash 66 kg, while Ryuji Umeda won gold in men's cue sports three-cushion singles. Additionally, the men futsal national team won silver a day after the women won gold medal.

== Participants ==
The following is the list of number of competitors participating in the Games.

Sport	Men	Women	Total
Bowling	4	4	8
Chess	2	3	5
Cue sports	9	2	11
Dancesport	4	4	8
Futsal	13	14	27
Go	4	2	6
Kabaddi	7	7	14
Kurash	3	0	3
Total	46	36	82

== Medal summary ==
=== Medal table ===
Sport	Gold	Silver	Bronze	Total
Cue sports	1	1	2	4
Kurash	1	1	1	3
Futsal	1	1	0	2
Bowling	0	1	2	3
Dancesport	0	0	2	2
Go	0	0	1	1
Totals (6 entries)	3	4	8	15

=== Medalists ===
Medal	Name	Sport	Event	Date
Gold	Kota Eto	Kurash	Men's 66 kg	July 4
Gold	Ryuji Umeda	Cue sports	Men's three-cushion singles	July 4
Gold	Mayo Akimoto; Yuki Saita; Haruna Kitazumi; Kana Shibahara; Natsumi Koide; Misato Ino; Chikage Kichibayashi; Mutsumi Sakata; Minako Sekinada; Shiori Nakajima; Kana Kitagawa; Sakae Honda; Minae Aoyama; Yumiko Shinomiya	Futsal	Women's team	July 5
Silver	Daisuke Yoshida; Tomoyuki Sasaki	Bowling	Men's doubles	July 2
Silver	Chihiro Kawahara	Cue sports	Women's ten-ball singles	July 4
Silver	Yuma Saeki	Kurash	Men's +90 kg	July 6
Silver	Toru Fukimbara; Shunta Uchimura; Satoshi Tanno; Toru Sato; Manabu Takita; Tomoaki Watanabe; Rafael Henmi; Yoshifumi Nagai; Taiki Seike; Kazuhiro Nibuya; Yushi Sekiguchi; Tomoki Yoshikawa; Akira Minamoto; Ryosuke Nishitani	Futsal	Men's team	July 6
Bronze	Toshihiko Takahashi	Bowling	Men's singles	June 30
Bronze	Yoichiro Mori	Cue sports	Men's one-cushion singles	July 1
Bronze	O Takeshima	Cue sports	Men's three-cushion singles	July 4
Bronze	Yumiya Kubota; Rara Kubota	Dancesport	Jive	July 5
Bronze	Yuki Suzuki; Ayaka Harada	Dancesport	Cha-cha-cha	July 5
Bronze	Tomoya Hirata; Katsuya Motoki; Atsushi Sada; Kazushi Tsuruta	Go	Men's team	July 5
Bronze	Daichi Kusano	Kurash	Men's 90 kg	July 5
Bronze	Haruka Matsuda; Natsuki Teshima; Misaki Mukotani; Hikaru Takekawa	Bowling	Women's team	July 6
