= Ijaz-ur-Rehman =

Pakistani ten-pin bowling player

Ijaz Ur Rehman (born 15 Feb 1973 is a ten-pin bowler from Islamabad, Pakistan. He is a right-handed hook shooter. He is the national champion of ten-pin bowling in Pakistan and is also currently the secretary-general of the Pakistan Tenpin Bowling Federation.

== Titles ==
Bowler of the Year Award: 2002
Bowler of the Year Award: 2003
Bowler of the Year Award: 2005
Bowler of the Year Award: 2010
Best Organizer of National Championships Award: 2008
Best Organizer of Tournaments in Pakistan as a general secretary of PTBF award: 2009
Best Organizer of 2nd Mohtarama Benazir Shaheed Tenpin Bowling Championship Award: 2010
Best Organizer of National Championships Award: 2008

== Achievements ==
1.1st National Tenpin Bowling Champion 2002 (Winner)
2. Colombo Tenpin Bowling Championship 2002 at Portugal (Runner-up)
3. 3rd All Pakistan Bowlers Championship 2003 (Champion)
4. 4th All Pakistan Bowlers Championship 2004 (Champion)
5. Team Event of 4th National Tenpin Bowling Championship 2009 (Winner)
6. 4th National tenpin Bowling Championship 2009 (Runner-up)
7. 1st Mohtarama Benazir Tenpin Bowling Championship 2008.(Runner-up)
8. 2nd Mega Zone Bowling Championship 2007 (Winner Doubles)
9. 4th Islamabad Tenpin Bowling Championship 2010 (Winner)
10. 3rd Royal Rodale APBA Independence Day Bowling Championship 2005 (Winner Doubles)
11. 1st League Tenpin Bowling Championship 2006 (Runner-up)
12. 1st Planet Bowling Tournament 2002 (Winner)
13. 2nd Mohtarma Benazir Bhutto Shaheed Tenpin Bowling Championship 2010 (Highest Scorer)
14. 2nd National Tenpin Bowling Championship 2003 (Top Scorer)
15. 5th Royal Rodale APBA Independence Day Bowling Championship 2005 (Winner)
16. V.net Tenpin Bowling Championship 2004 (Winner)
17.3rd Mega Zone Tenpin Bowling championship 2008(Highest Scorer)
18. 3rd Mega Zone Tenpin Bowling championship 2008 (Runner-up)
19. 3rd Islamabad Tenpin Bowling Championship 2007 (3rd Position)
20. 2nd Mega Zone Bowling Championship 2006 (Winner)
21. 2nd National Tenpin Bowling Championship 2008 (Team Winner)
22. Islamabad Bowling Challenge 2002 (Winner)
23. 2nd National Tenpin Bowling Championship 2004 (Winner)
24. 4th ANF National Tenpin Bowling Championship 2009 (Runner-up)
25. 2nd Mohtarama Benazir Shaheed Tenpin Bowling Championship 2010 (Team Winner Gold medalist)
26. Mega Zone Bowling Promotional Championship 2001 (Winner)
27. Mega Zone Bowling Promotional Championship 2000 (Winner)
28. Hunch Tenpin Bowling Championship 2003 (Winner)
29.1st Islamabad Premier League Tenpin Bowling Championship 2010 (Runner-up)
30. 2nd Islamabad Premier League Tenpin Bowling Championship 2010 (Winner)
31. Runner up of 1st Ptbf Ranking Tenpin Bowling Championship 2011 Karachi 32. National Champion of Pakistan 2015 33. National Championship 2018 (Runner-up)
