= South Korea at the 2013 Asian Indoor and Martial Arts Games =

- IOC code: KOR
- NOC: Korean Olympic Committee

in Incheon
- Competitors: 121 in 9 sports
- Officials: 47
- Medals Ranked 2nd: Gold 21 Silver 27 Bronze 19 Total 67

Asian Indoor and Martial Arts Games appearances
- 2005; 2007; 2009; 2013; 2017; 2021; 2025

South Korea participated in the 2013 Asian Indoor and Martial Arts Games in Incheon, South Korea on 29 June – 6 July

South Korea sent 121 athletes which competed in 9 sports.

== Medal summary ==
=== Medal table ===
Sport	Gold	Silver	Bronze	Total
Short course swimming	8	11	4	23
Electronic sports	4	2	0	6
Cue sports	3	0	1	4
Kickboxing	2	1	2	5
Dancesport	1	7	1	9
Bowling	1	3	3	7
Go	1	3	2	6
Muay	1	0	2	3
Indoor kabaddi	0	0	2	2
Kurash	0	0	2	2
Totals (10 entries)	21	27	19	67

=== Medalists ===
Medal	Name	Sport	Event
Gold	Park Jong-Woo, Shin Seung-Hyeon	Bowling	Men's Doubles
Gold	Hwang Durk-Hee	Cue sports	Men's One-cushion singles
Gold	Cha Yu-Ram	Cue sports	Women's Nine-ball singles
Gold	Cha Yu-Ram	Cue sports	Women's Ten-ball singles
Gold	Nam Gi-Yong, Lee Da-Jung	Dancesport	Latin dance - Samba
Gold	Kim Yu-Jin	Electronic sports	StarCraft II: Heart of the Swarm
Gold	Kim Hyun-Jin	Electronic sports	Tekken Tag Tournament 2
Gold	Choi In-Seok, Kim Chan-Ho, Ko Dong-Bin, Won Sang-Yeon, Yoo Sang-Wook	Electronic sports	League of Legends
Gold	Do Min-Su, Jeong Su-Ik, Kim Dong-Ho, Lee Sung-Wan, Leem Kuk-Hyun	Electronic sports	Special Force
Gold	Byeon Sang-Il, Kang Seung-Min, Lee Dong-Hun, Na Hyun	Go	Men's Team
Gold	Park Hye-Young	Kickboxing	Women's Point fighting (-57 kg)
Gold	Ahn Jae-Yeong	Kickboxing	Men's Low kick (-81 kg)
Gold	Kim Sang-Jae	Muay	Men's Bantamweight (51–54 kg)
Gold	Yang Jung-Doo	Short course swimming	Men's 50 m freestyle
Gold	Ju Jang-Hun	Short course swimming	Men's 50 m breaststroke
Gold	Ju Jang-Hun	Short course swimming	Men's 100 m breaststroke
Gold	Yang Jung-Doo	Short course swimming	Men's 50 m butterfly
Gold	Chang Gyu-Cheol	Short course swimming	Men's 100 m butterfly
Gold	Kim Go-Eun	Short course swimming	Women's 50 m breaststroke
Gold	Back Su-Yeon	Short course swimming	Women's 100 m breaststroke
Gold	Hwang Seo-Jin	Short course swimming	Women's 50 m butterfly
Gold	Kim Ji-Hyun, Kim Go-Eun, Park Jin-Young, Hwang Seo-Jin	Short course swimming	Women's 4×50 m medley relay
Silver	Kim Jun-Yung	Bowling	Men's Singles
Silver	Cho Young-Seon, Park Jong-Woo, Shin Seung-Hyeon, Kim Jun-Yung	Bowling	Men's Team of 4
Silver	Hwang Yeon-Ju, Son Yun-Hee	Bowling	Women's Doubles
Silver	Park Seong-Woo, Jo Su-Bin	Dancesport	Standard dance - Quickstep
Silver	Hwang Yong-Ha, Song Hye-Ri	Dancesport	Standard dance - Slow foxtrot
Silver	Hwang Yong-Ha, Song Hye-Ri	Dancesport	Standard dance - Tango
Silver	Park Seong-Woo, Jo Su-Bin	Dancesport	Standard dance - Waltz
Silver	Nam Gi-Yong, Lee Da-Jung	Dancesport	Latin dance - Cha-cha-cha
Silver	Jang Se-Jin, Lee Hae-In	Dancesport	Latin dance - Jive
Silver	Jang Se-Jin, Lee Hae-In	Dancesport	Latin dance - Paso doble
Silver	Lee Young-Ho	Electronic sports	StarCraft II: Heart of the Swarm
Silver	Bae Jae-Min	Electronic sports	Tekken Tag Tournament 2
Silver	Byeon Sang-Il	Go	Men's Individual
Silver	Choi Jeong, Kim Chae-Young, Oh Jeong-A, Oh Yu-Jin	Go	Women's Team
Silver	Na Hyun, Choi Jeong	Go	Mixed Pair
Silver	Yu Hyun-Woo	Kickboxing	Men's Low kick (-63.5 kg)
Silver	Shin Hee-Woong	Short course swimming	Men's 50 m backstroke
Silver	Choi Kyu-Woong	Short course swimming	Men's 100 m breaststroke
Silver	Chang Gyu-Cheol	Short course swimming	Men's 50 m butterfly
Silver	Shin Hee-Woong, Shin Hyeong-Keun, Chang Gyu-Cheol, Yang Jung-Doo	Short course swimming	Men's 4×50 m medley relay
Silver	Shin Hee-Woong, Ju Jang-Hun, Chang Gyu-Cheol, Jeong Jeong-Soo	Short course swimming	Men's 4×100 m medley relay
Silver	Back Su-Yeon	Short course swimming	Women's 50 m breaststroke
Silver	Kim Go-Eun	Short course swimming	Women's 100 m breaststroke
Silver	Park Jin-Young	Short course swimming	Women's 50 m butterfly
Silver	Park Jin-Young	Short course swimming	Women's 100 m butterfly
Silver	Kim Ji-Hyun, Back Su-Yeon, Park Jin-Young, Hwang Seo-Jin	Short course swimming	Women's 4×100 m medley relay
Bronze	Hwang Yeon-Ju	Bowling	Women's Singles
Bronze	Son Yun-Hee	Bowling	Women's Singles
Bronze	Jung Da-Wun, Hwang Yeon-Ju, Lee Na-Young, Son Yun-Hee	Bowling	Women's Team of 4
Bronze	Kim Ga-Young	Cue sports	Women's Nine-ball singles
Bronze	Kim Dong-Soo, Lee Min-Joo	Dancesport	Standard dance - Five dances
Bronze	Lee Dong-Hun	Go	Men's Individual
Bronze	Kang Seung-Min, Oh Jeong-A	Go	Mixed Pair
Bronze	Kim Ki-Dong, Eom Tae-Deok, Lee Jang-Kun, Hong Dong-Ju, Ahn Hwan-Gi, Kim Seong-Ryeol, Maeng Moo-Sung	Indoor kabaddi	Men's Team
Bronze	Im Jae-Won, Lee Hyun-Jeong, Shin So-Min, Kim Hee-Jeong, Yoon Yu-Ri, Seo Eun-Hye, Jo Hyun-A	Indoor kabaddi	Women's Team
Bronze	Kim Jun-Seong	Kickboxing	Men's Point fighting (-63 kg)
Bronze	Kim Min-Kyoung	Kickboxing	Women's Low kick (-52 kg)
Bronze	Kim Chan-Kyu	Kurash	Men's Half middleweight (-81 kg)
Bronze	Seo Bo-Young	Kurash	Women's Lightweight (-57 kg)
Bronze	Lee Sun	Muay	Women's Flyweight (48–51 kg)
Bronze	Kim Min-Ji	Muay	Women's Bantamweight (51–54 kg)
Bronze	Jeong Jeong-Soo	Short course swimming	Men's 200 m freestyle
Bronze	Shin Hee-Woong	Short course swimming	Men's 100 m backstroke
Bronze	Shin Hyeong-Keun	Short course swimming	Men's 50 m breaststroke
Bronze	Choi Kyu-Woong	Short course swimming	Men's 200 m individual medley
Bronze	Shin Hee-Woong, Chang Gyu-Cheol, Jeong Jeong-Soo, Yang Jung-Doo	Short course swimming	Men's 4×50 m freestyle relay
Bronze	Jeong Jeong-Soo, Chang Gyu-Cheol, Im Tae-Jeong, Yang Jung-Doo	Short course swimming	Men's 4×100 m freestyle relay
Bronze	Kim Go-Eun, Park Jin-Young, Kim Ji-Hyun, Hwang Seo-Jin	Short course swimming	Women's 4×50 m freestyle relay
