= Indonesia at the 2013 Asian Indoor and Martial Arts Games =

- IOC code: INA
- NOC: Indonesian Olympic Committee
- Website: www.nocindonesia.or.id (in English)

in Incheon
- Competitors: 76 in 6 sports
- Medals Ranked 19th: Gold 0 Silver 2 Bronze 3 Total 5

Asian Indoor and Martial Arts Games appearances
- 2005; 2007; 2009; 2013; 2017; 2021; 2026

Indonesia participated in the 2013 Asian Indoor and Martial Arts Games in Incheon, South Korea on 29 June – 6 July 2013.

Indonesia sent 76 athletes to compete in 6 sports.

== Medal summary ==
=== Medal table ===
| Sport | Gold | Silver | Bronze | Total |
|---|---|---|---|---|
| Short course swimming | 0 | 2 | 1 | 3 |
| Bowling | 0 | 0 | 1 | 1 |
| Chess | 0 | 0 | 1 | 1 |
| Total | 0 | 2 | 3 | 5 |

=== Medalists ===
| Medal | Name | Sport | Event | Date |
|---|---|---|---|---|
| Silver | Triady Fauzi Sidiq | Short course swimming | Men's 50 m freestyle | 30 June |
| Silver | Glenn Victor Sutanto | Short course swimming | Men's 100 m butterfly | 1 Jul |
| Bronze | Glenn Victor Sutanto | Short course swimming | Men's 50 m butterfly | 2 Jul |
| Bronze | Billy Muhammad Islam; Hardy Rachmadian; Ryan Leonard Lalisang; Yeri Ramadona | Bowling | Men's Team of 4 | 6 Jul |
| Bronze | Susanto Megaranto; Hamdani Rudin; Irine Kharisma Sukandar; Medina Warda Aulia; Chelsie Monica Sihite | Chess | Mixed team blitz | 6 Jul |
