= Clearlove =

League of Legends player

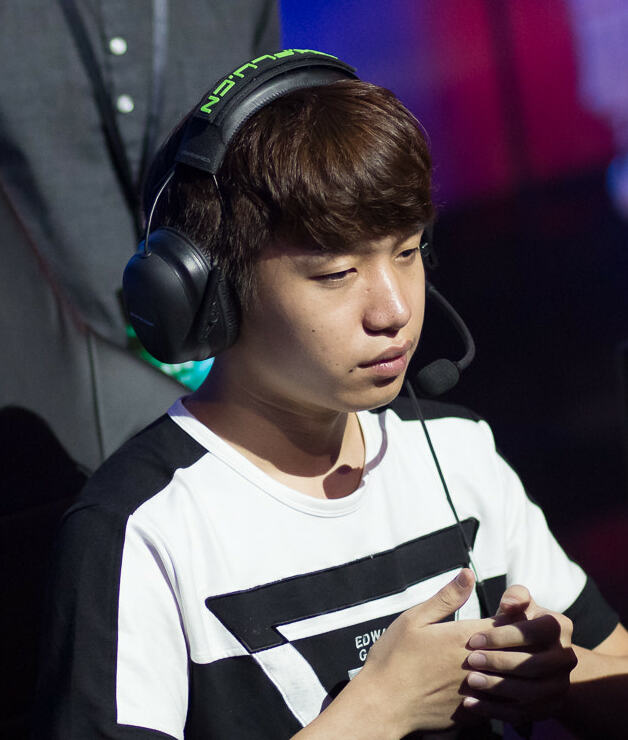
- Ming in 2015

Personal information
- Name: 明凯 (Ming Kai)
- Nationality: Chinese

Current team
- Team: Edward Gaming
- Game: League of Legends
- League: LPL

Career information
- Playing career: 2012–2019, 2021–2022
- Coaching career: 2020–2021

Team history

As player:
- 2012: Team Phoenix
- 2012–2014: Team WE
- 2014–2019: Edward Gaming
- 2021–2022: Edward Gaming

As coach:
- 2020: Edward Gaming

Career highlights and awards
- MSI champion (2015); MSI MVP; Rift Rivals champion (2017); 3× LPL champion; 2× Demacia Cup champion

Ming Kai, better known as Clearlove, is a Chinese former professional League of Legends player and supervisor for Edward Gaming of the League of Legends Pro League (LPL). He is one of China's most well-known League of Legends players and is a veteran of the region. He was ranked third by ESPN in their 2016 top ten list for League of Legends pros.

In December 2019 Clearlove retired from professional play and moved on to coaching duties. However, he announced his return to professional play in December 2020.
