= Misaya =

Chinese e-sports competitor

Personal information
- Name: 禹景曦 (Yu Jingxi)
- Nationality: Chinese

Career information
- Game: League of Legends
- Playing career: 2011–2013
- Role: Mid Laner

Team history
- Team WE: 2011–2013

Yu Jingxi (Chinese: 禹景曦; pinyin: Yǔ Jǐngxī), better known by his in-game name Misaya, is a Chinese retired professional League of Legends player. He played as the mid laner for Team WE from March 2011 until his retirement in December 2013. Following his retirement he became a streamer and one of the most well-known public figures in China's League of Legends scene.

== Career ==
Misaya originally played Dota and competed at semi-professional tournaments, but quit the game after a brief unsuccessful career. Shortly after, he moved on to League of Legends with his close friends. His skillful play-style caught the attention of Team WE (then-known as World Elite), which he joined in March 2011 as their starting mid laner. Misaya and his team would go on to finish in the top eight at the Season 2 World Championship. He retired in December 2013 to focus on streaming and promoting League of Legends in China.

During his prime, Misaya was known for his prowess as the character Twisted Fate. A play involving the use of Twisted Fate's ultimate move "Destiny" to bait out enemy abilities after teleporting was named after him by fans.

== Notable achievements ==
2011–2013
Date	Event	Placing	Final game		
March 9, 2013	G-League 2012 Season 2	(gold) 1st	Team WE	3–2	Invictus Gaming
December 2, 2012	IGN ProLeague Season 5 tournament	(gold) 1st	Team WE	3–1	Fnatic
October 13, 2012	Season 2 World Championship	5th–8th	CLG EU	1–2	Team WE

== Personal life ==
Misaya married Yin Lanyi on October 5, 2018, and announced on the same day that Yin was expecting a child.
