= Armin Pumpanmuang =

Thai Muay Thai kickboxer

- Born: Armin Mutlee; April 19, 1987 (age 39); Chana district, Songkhla province, Thailand
- Native name: อามีน พุ่มพันธุ์ม่วง
- Other names: Armin Black Dragon Swiss; Armin Matli
- Nationality: Thai
- Height: 1.74 m (5 ft 8 1/2 in)
- Weight: 67 kg (148 lb; 11 st); 70 kg (154 lb; 11 st)
- Division: Welterweight; Super welterweight
- Style: Muay Thai
- Fighting out of: Bangkok, Thailand
- Team: Muaythai Plaza 2004 - Windysport
- Trainer: Pid Kaisongtanaikwam

Kickboxing record
- Total: 148
- Wins: 126
- By knockout: 44
- Losses: 21
- By knockout: 6
- Draws: 1
- Last updated on: September 22, 2013

Medal record

Men's Muay Thai

Representing Thailand

Asian Championships
Gold medal – first place	2011 Tehran	71 kg

Arafura Games
Gold medal – first place	2011 Darwin	71 kg

Armin Pumpanmuang (born April 19, 1987) is a Thai Muay Thai kickboxer. He is a former WPMF World Welterweight Champion (147 lbs).

== Biography and career ==
Born and raised in the Chana district of the Songkhla province, Armin practiced Muay Thai from an early age, in addition to the sport's historical form: Muay boran.

Armin first signed with the Sasiprapha Gym. He began fighting in the 40 kg division. Later, Armin moved to the Kiatkumtorn gym, where he trained under Jomhod Kiatadisak. At the same time, he began fighting at Omnoi Stadium. He then moved to ‘Muaythai Plaza 2004-Windysport' to continue his training. However, he failed to become the Omnoi Stadium champion when he lost to Yordsanpol Sitsanpol in their title fight.

From then onwards, Armin trained with Windysport, where he began achieving success. He was pushed to fight in the Pumpanmuang promotion's fights, scoring victories against the likes of Sammuk Sasiprapa Gym, Plarnchai Sor Kamsingh, and Chokechuchai Sor Sanchai in the 'Bangrajan fight'.

Armin was very successful at the start of 2011. After losing in the World Amateur Muay Thai tournament in the 71-kilogram division, he won in the Asian Muay Thai Championships in the same weight division. Armin also won the gold medal in the Arafura Games in Australia. He also won a Z-1 tournament and the WPMF Muay Thai world championship in France.

Armin went on to gain international exposure by fighting in several countries, such as Germany, Denmark, Switzerland, Australia, Japan, and China.

He defeated Faizal Ramli by decision at the Thailand vs. Asia event in Malaysia on October 9, 2012.

He lost to Roman Mailov via KO due to a knee to the body in the extension round at W5 Fighter 8 in Moscow, Russia on November 8, 2012.

He TKO'd Sekou Dembele in round two at Le Choc des Légendes 2013 in Paris, France, on March 9, 2013.

Armin was to fight Sean Kearney at Muaythai Superfight on May 13, 2013 but the fight fell through.

He outpointed Mohammed Doroudian at THAI FIGHT Extreme 2013: Pattani in Pattani, Thailand on September 22, 2013.

He defeated Ginga Muay Farang (Gian Carlo Corba) by first-round TKO at Combat Banchamek event in Chiang Rai, Thailand on 15 August 2014

At Ring War 2015, Armin defeated Luca Tagliarno to win the WBC Muay Thai International 70 kg Championship.

On August 10, 2017, he faced Cai Liangchan at CKF China Kungfu International Challenge-Macau in Macau for the CKF Intercontinental 80 kg Championship. Armin lost by first-round TKO.

== Titles and achievements ==
=== Muay Thai ===
- WBC Muay Thai
  - 2015 WBC Muay Thai -70 kg International Champion
- World Pro League Muaythai
  - 2011 World Pro League Muaythai World Welterweight Champion (147 lbs)
- World Professional Muaythai Federation
  - 2011 W.P.M.F. Muaythai World Welterweight Champion (147 lbs)
- Miri City Z1 World Muay Thai Series
  - 2010 Miri City Z1 World Muay Thai Series champion
- Regional
  - South Thailand Champion

=== Amateur Muay Thai ===
- Asian Championships
  - Gold medal in Asian Championships at Iran (gold) (71 kg)
- Arafura Games
  - Gold medal in Arafura Games at Australia (gold) (71 kg)

== Kickboxing record ==
Kickboxing record
126 Wins (44 (T)KO's), 21 Losses, 1 Draws
Date	Result	Opponent	Event	Location	Method	Round	Time
2017-08-10	Loss	(Macau) Cai Liangchan	CKF China Kungfu International Challenge-Macau	Macau, China	TKO (Low Kick)	1	
For the CKF Intercontinental Champion -80 kg. title.
2017-02-18	Loss	(Italy) Anouar Khamlali	Ring War	Monza, Italy	TKO (Ref.Stoppage)	2	
2016-12-24	Win	(France) Said Amran	CGBQ	Taizhou, China	Decision	3	3:00
2016-07-02	Win	(China) Jiao Fukai	WLF Glory of Heroes 3	China	Ex.R TKO (Ref.Stoppage)	4	3:00
2016-02-06	Win	(Italy) Armen Petrosyan	Ring War 3	Monza, Italy	Decision	5	3:00
2016-01-09	Loss	(Belarus) Dzianis Zuev	Kunlun Fight 36	Shanghai, China	Decision	3	3:00
2015-12-05	Win	(Ukraine) Sasha Moisa	Workpoint Super Muaythai	Bangkok, Thailand	Decision	3	3:00
2015-10-22	Loss	(Thailand) Wanmechai Menayothin	Thai Fight	Bangkok, Thailand	KO (left high kick)	2	
2015-06	Loss	(France) Steeve Valente	Ultimate K-1 Championship	Strasbourg, France	KO (fell from the ring)	3	
For the WKN World Oriental Rules -76 kg. title.
2015-04-14	Loss	(Thailand) Yodkhunpon Sitmonchai		Bang Saphan District, Thailand	KO	3	
2015-02-28	Win	(Italy) Luca Tagliarino	Ring War 2015	Sesto San Giovanni, Italy	TKO		
Wins the WBC International Muay Thai -70 kg. title.
2014-11-22	Loss	(Thailand) Teded Sitjakong	Isuzu Cup, Omnoi Stadium	Samut Sakhon, Thailand	Decision	5	3:00
2014-10-18	Loss	(Thailand) Wanchalerm Aooddonmuang	Isuzu Cup, Omnoi Stadium	Samut Sakhon, Thailand	KO (Elbow)	3	3:00
2014-08-15	Win	(Italy) Gian Carlo Corba (Ginga Muay Farang)	Combat Banchamek	Chiang Rai, Thailand	TKO	1	3:00
2014-05-03	Loss	(Thailand) Moses Tor. Sangtiennoi	Isuzu Cup, Omnoi Stadium	Samut Sakhon, Thailand	Decision	5	3:00
2013-09-22	Win	(Iran) Mohammed Doroudian	THAI FIGHT Extreme 2013: Pattani	Pattani, Thailand	Decision	3	3:00
2013-03-09	Win	(France) Sekou Dembele	Le Choc des Légendes 2013	Paris, France	TKO	2	
2013-01-01	Win	(China) Zhang de Zheng	Kung Fu vs Muay Thai 2013	Fujian, China	KO (Flying-Knee)	1	
2012-11-24	Win	(France) Stephane Celeste	Frank Lee's Muay Thai Mayhem 3	Edmonton, Alberta	Decision	5	3:00
2012-11-08	Loss	(Ukraine) Roman Mailov	W5 Fighter 8	Moscow, Russia	KO (knee to the body)	4	
2012-10-09	Win	(Malaysia) Faizal Ramli	Thailand vs Asia	Kuala Lumpur, Malaysia	Decision	5	3:00
2012-09-19	Win	(France) Raphaël Llodra	THAI FIGHT Extreme 2012: France	Lyon, France	TKO (cut)	3	
2012-08-17	Win	(France) Abdallah Mabel	THAI FIGHT Extreme 2012: England	Leicester, England	TKO (Ref. Stoppage)	2	
2012-04-17	Win	(Morocco) Ibrahim Chiahou	THAI FIGHT Extreme 2012: Pattaya	Pattaya, Thailand	TKO (Ref. Stoppage)	1	
2012-03-31	Win	(France) Cedric Flament	Fight Fever 5	Luxembourg, Luxembourg	TKO (Corner Stoppage)	4	
2011-12-30	Win	(France) Charles François	Gladiator's War	Pattaya, Thailand	Decision	5	3:00
Wins World Pro League Muaythai title (147 lbs).
2011-10-15	Win	(Albania) Faton Vukshiraj	Lions FC	Neuchâtel, Switzerland	Decision	5	3:00
2011-10-01	Win	(France) Morgan Adrar	Röschtigraben 2: Derby	Lausanne, Switzerland	TKO (cut)	2	3:00
2011-09-25	Win	(France) Abdoul Toure	THAI FIGHT 2011: First Round; 70 kg Superfight	Bangkok, Thailand	Decision	3	3:00
2011-07-23	Win	(China) Hong Guang	Thailand Versus Challenger Series 2011	Bangkok, Thailand	Decision	5	3:00
2011-05-21	Win	(France) Charles François	Les Rois du Ring	Châlons, France	KO (Left high kick)	1	
Wins WPMF World Muaythai title (147 lbs).
2011-05-01	Draw	(China) Yang Zhuo	Wu Lin Feng	Nanchang China	Decision	4	3:00
2010-10-23	Win	(Switzerland) Alexandre Boyancé	Roeschtigrabe Derby	Uetendorf, Switzerland	KO (high kick)	2	
2010-06-25	Win	(Tunisia) Ahmed Saadi	Miri City Z1 World Muaythai Series, Final	Sarawak, Malaysia	TKO	2	
Wins Miri City Z1 World Muaythai Series title.
2010-06-25	Win	(Australia) Mark Sarracino	Miri City Z1 World Muaythai Series, Semi Final	Sarawak, Malaysia	Decision		
2010-03-21	Loss	(China) Zhang Kai Yin	China-Thai 8-Man Tournament, Semi Final	Chongqing, China	Decision	3	3:00
2010-03-19	Win	(China) Wang Guan	China-Thai 8-Man Tournament, Quarter Final	Chongqing, China	Decision	3	3:00
2009-03-14	Loss	(Thailand) Petchsila Rawai Muay Thai	Muay Thai Against Drugs	Phuket, Thailand	Decision		
Legend: Win Loss Draw/No contest Notes

== See also ==
- List of male kickboxers
