= Philippines at the 2013 Asian Indoor and Martial Arts Games =

- IOC code: PHI
- NOC: Philippine Olympic Committee
- Website: www.olympic.ph (in English)

in Incheon
- Competitors: 40 in 6 sports
- Medals Ranked 19th: Gold 1 Silver 0 Bronze 2 Total 3

Asian Indoor and Martial Arts Games appearances
- 2005; 2007; 2009; 2013; 2017; 2021; 2026

The Philippines participated in the 2013 Asian Indoor and Martial Arts Games held in Incheon, South Korea from June 29 to July 6.

== Medalists ==
=== Gold ===
No.	Medal	Name	Sport	Event
1	Gold	Jerald Gamili; Cherry Parcon	DanceSport	Latin-Jive

=== Bronze ===
No.	Medal	Name	Sport	Event
1	Bronze	Rubilen Amit	Cue sports	Women's 10-Ball Single
2	Bronze	Jerald Gamili; Cherry Parcon	DanceSport	Latin-Five Dances

=== Multiple ===
Name	Sport	Gold	Silver	Bronze	Total
Jerald Gamili	Dancesport	1	0	1	2
Cherry Parcon	Dancesport	1	0	1	2

== Medal summary ==
=== By sports ===
Sport	Gold	Silver	Bronze	Total
Dancesport	1	0	1	2
Cue sports	0	0	1	1
Totals (2 entries)	1	0	2	3
