= Vietnam at the 2013 Asian Indoor and Martial Arts Games =

- IOC code: VIE
- NOC: Vietnam Olympic Committee
- Website: www.voc.org.vn (in Vietnamese and English)

in Incheon
- Competitors: 102 in 11 sports
- Medals Ranked 3rd: Gold 8 Silver 7 Bronze 12 Total 27

Asian Indoor and Martial Arts Games appearances
- 2005; 2007; 2009; 2013; 2017; 2021; 2026

Vietnam will participate in the 2013 Asian Indoor and Martial Arts Games in Incheon, South Korea on 29 June – 6 July 2013.

Vietnam sent 102 athletes which will compete in 11 sports.

== Medalists ==
Medal	Name	Sport	Event
Gold	Chess team	Chess	Blitz
Gold	Nguyen van Su	Kick Boxing	Men's Point Fighting -74kg
Gold	Nguyen Thi Tuyet Mai	Kick Boxing	Women's Full Contact -56kg
Gold	Nguyen Thi Tuyet Dung	Kick Boxing	Women's Low Kick -52kg
Gold	Van Ngoc Tu	Kurash	Women -52 kg
Gold	Nguyen Tran Duy Nhat	Muay	Men's -57kg
Gold	Hoang Quy Phuoc	Short Course Swimming 25m	Men's 100m Freestyle
Gold	Nguyen Thi Anh Vien	Short Course Swimming 25m	Women's 200m Individual Medley
