= Chess at the 2013 Asian Indoor and Martial Arts Games =

- Venue: Yonsei University
- Dates: 30 June – 6 July 2013

Chess for the 2013 Asian Indoor and Martial Arts Games was held at the Yonsei Global University Campus. It took place from 30 June to 6 July 2013. This was the third time this sport was part of the Games, after Macau 2007 and Hanoi 2009.

== Medalists ==
Event	Gold	Silver	Bronze
Men's individual standard	Yu Yangyi; China	Salem Saleh; United Arab Emirates	Ding Liren; China
Women's individual standard	Hou Yifan; China	Zhao Xue; China	Bhakti Kulkarni; Independent Olympic Athletes
Mixed team blitz	Vietnam; Lê Quang Liêm; Nguyễn Ngọc Trường Sơn; Nguyễn Đức Hòa; Phạm Lê Thảo Nguyên; Hoàng Thị Bảo Trâm; Nguyễn Thị Thanh An	China; Ding Liren; Yu Yangyi; Xiu Deshun; Hou Yifan; Zhao Xue; Guo Qi	Indonesia; Susanto Megaranto; Hamdani Rudin; Irene Kharisma Sukandar; Medina Warda Aulia; Chelsie Monica Ignesias Sihite
Mixed team rapid	China; Ding Liren; Yu Yangyi; Xiu Deshun; Hou Yifan; Zhao Xue; Guo Qi	Independent Olympic Athletes; S. P. Sethuraman; Deep Sengupta; Subbaraman Meenakshi; Bhakti Kulkarni	Vietnam; Lê Quang Liêm; Nguyễn Ngọc Trường Sơn; Nguyễn Đức Hòa; Phạm Lê Thảo Nguyên; Hoàng Thị Bảo Trâm; Nguyễn Thị Thanh An

== Medal table ==
Rank	Nation	Gold	Silver	Bronze	Total
1	China (CHN)	3	2	1	6
2	Vietnam (VIE)	1	0	1	2
3	Independent Olympic Athletes (AOI)	0	1	1	2
4	United Arab Emirates (UAE)	0	1	0	1
5	Indonesia (INA)	0	0	1	1
Totals (5 entries)		4	4	4	12

== Results ==
=== Men's individual standard ===
30 June – 3 July

Rank	Athlete	R1	R2	R3	R4	R5	R6	R7	Pts
1st place, gold medalist(s)	Yu Yangyi (CHN)	YEM2; 1	KAZ2; 1	AOI2; 1	UAE1; 1	CHN2 ½	QAT1; 1	MGL1; 1	6½
2nd place, silver medalist(s)	Salem Saleh (UAE)	THA2; 1	JPN2; 1	AOI1; 1	CHN1; 0	UZB1; 1	VIE1 ½	CHN2; 1	5½
3rd place, bronze medalist(s)	Ding Liren (CHN)	YEM1; 1	MGL2; 1	KAZ1 ½	QAT1; 1	CHN1 ½	AOI2; 1	UAE1; 0	5
4	S. P. Sethuraman (AOI)	MYA2; 1	BAN2; 1	UAE1; 0	QAT2; 1	MGL1 ½	INA2 ½	KAZ2; 1	5
5	Marat Dzhumaev (UZB)	BRU1; 1	SIN1; 1	MGL1 ½	PHI2 ½	UAE1; 0	SRI1; 1	INA2; 1	5
6	Rinat Jumabayev (KAZ)	THA1; 1	BAN1; 1	CHN2 ½	MGL1 ½	INA2 ½	VIE2; 1	VIE1 ½	5
7	Mohammed Al-Modiahki (QAT)	SRI1; 1	QAT2; 1	PHI2; 1	CHN2; 0	UZB2; 1	CHN1; 0	PHI1 ½	4½
8	Deep Sengupta (AOI)	KOR1; 1	INA1; 1	CHN1; 0	YEM1; 1	MGL2; 1	CHN2; 0	PHI2 ½	4½
9	Farid Firmansyah (INA)	KOR2; 1	AOI2; 0	BRU1; 1	PHI1; 1	IRI2 ½	MGL1; 0	VIE2; 1	4½
10	Tsegmediin Batchuluun (MGL)	LIB1; 1	VIE1; 1	UZB1 ½	KAZ1 ½	AOI1 ½	INA1; 1	CHN1; 0	4½
11	Lê Quang Liêm (VIE)	SYR1; 1	MGL1; 0	SYR2; 1	SIN1 ½	PHI2; 1	UAE1 ½	KAZ1 ½	4½
12	Mark Paragua (PHI)	JPN1 ½	MYA1; 1	INA2 ½	INA1; 0	SIN1; 1	QAT2; 1	QAT1 ½	4½
13	Anuar Ismagambetov (KAZ)	NEP1; 1	CHN1; 0	YEM1; 0	THA2; 1	SIN2; 1	UZB2; 1	AOI1; 0	4
14	Oliver Barbosa (PHI)	UAE2; 1	VIE2; 1	QAT1; 0	UZB1 ½	VIE1; 0	JPN2; 1	AOI2 ½	4
15	Anton Filippov (UZB)	SIN2 ½	IRI2 ½	YEM2; 1	BAN1; 1	QAT1; 0	KAZ2; 0	QAT2; 1	4
16	Goh Wei Ming (SIN)	MDV1; 1	UZB1; 0	KOR1; 1	VIE1 ½	PHI1; 0	JPN1; 1	IRI2 ½	4
17	Bayarsaikhany Gündavaa (MGL)	SRI2; 1	CHN2; 0	SIN2; 1	SRI1; 1	AOI2; 0	IRI2 ½	BAN1 ½	4
18	Minhazuddin Ahmed Sagar (BAN)	MDV2; 1	KAZ1; 0	THA2; 1	UZB2; 0	MYA2 ½	SYR2; 1	MGL2 ½	4
19	Niaz Murshed (BAN)	MAC2; 1	AOI1; 0	JPN1 ½	SYR2; 1	VIE2; 0	MYA2; 1	SYR1 ½	4
20	Pouria Darini (IRI)	SYR2; 0	NEP2; 0 WO	MDV1; 1	KOR1 ½	LIB1; 1	SYR1 ½	NEP2; 1	4
21	Susanto Megaranto (INA)	NEP2; 1	SYR2 ½	PHI1 ½	THA1; 1	KAZ1 ½	AOI1 ½	UZB1; 0	4
22	Samir Mohammad (SYR)	VIE1; 0	LIB1; 1 WO	IRI2 ½	MYA2 ½	THA1; 1	IRI1 ½	BAN2 ½	4
23	Ehsan Ghaemmaghami (IRI)	MYA1 ½	UZB2 ½	SYR1 ½	JPN1; 1	INA1 ½	MGL2 ½	SIN1 ½	4
24	Romesh Weerawardane (SRI)	QAT1; 0	PLE1; 1	UAE2; 1	MGL2; 0	YEM1; 1	UZB1; 0	JPN2 ½	3½
25	Nguyễn Đức Hòa (VIE)	MAC1; 1	PHI2; 0	MYA2 ½	MYA1; 1	BAN2; 1	KAZ1; 0	INA1; 0	3½
26	Zendan Al-Zendani (YEM)	CHN2; 0	SRI2; 1	KAZ2; 1	AOI2; 0	SRI1; 0	KOR1; 1	BRU1 ½	3½
27	Kyaw Lin Naing (MYA)	IRI2 ½	PHI1; 0	MAC1; 1	VIE2; 0	KOR1; 0	SRI2; 1	THA2; 1	3½
28	Yee Soon Wei (BRU)	UZB1; 0	MDV1; 1	INA1; 0	MAC2; 1	QAT2; 0	NEP1; 1	YEM1 ½	3½
29	Ryosuke Nanjo (JPN)	PHI1 ½	SIN2 ½	BAN2 ½	IRI2; 0	MAC1; 1	SIN1; 0	THA1; 1	3½
30	Husein Aziz Nezad (QAT)	PLE1; 1	QAT1; 0	NEP2; 1	AOI1; 0	BRU1; 1	PHI1; 0	UZB2; 0	3
31	Prachand Man Malakar (NEP)	KAZ2; 0	YEM2; 0	KOR2; 1	SIN2; 0	MDV2; 1	BRU1; 0	MAC1; 1	3
32	Khaled Akhras (SYR)	IRI1; 1	INA2 ½	VIE1; 0	BAN2; 0	YEM2; 1	BAN1; 0	UAE2 ½	3
33	Manish Hamal (NEP)	INA2; 0	IRI1; 1 WO	QAT2; 0	YEM2 ½	THA2 ½	SIN2; 1	IRI1; 0	3
34	Lee Sang-hoon (KOR)	AOI2; 0	KOR2; 1	SIN1; 0	IRI1 ½	MYA1; 1	YEM1; 0	YEM2 ½	3
35	Bassel Charaf (LIB)	MGL1; 0	SYR1; 0 WO	MDV2; 1	JPN2 ½	IRI1; 0	MAC2; 1	MYA2 ½	3
36	Daniel Chan (SIN)	UZB2 ½	JPN1 ½	MGL2; 0	NEP1; 1	KAZ2; 0	NEP2; 0	KOR2; 1	3
37	Mohammed Othman (YEM)	CHN1; 0	NEP1; 1	UZB2; 0	NEP2 ½	SYR2; 0	MAC1; 1	KOR1 ½	3
38	Shinya Kojima (JPN)	PLE2; 1	UAE1; 0	THA1; 0	LIB1 ½	SRI2; 1	PHI2; 0	SRI1 ½	3
39	Zaw Oo (MYA)	AOI1; 0	MAC2; 1	VIE2 ½	SYR1 ½	BAN1 ½	BAN2; 0	LIB1 ½	3
40	Ibrahim Al-Khoori (UAE)	PHI2; 0	MAC1 ½	SRI1; 0	SRI2 ½	MAC2; 1	THA1 ½	SYR2 ½	3
41	Warot Kananub (THA)	KAZ1; 0	MDV2; 1	JPN2; 1	INA2; 0	SYR1; 0	UAE2 ½	JPN1; 0	2½
42	Isuru Alahakoon (SRI)	MGL2; 0	YEM1; 0	PLE1; 1	UAE2 ½	JPN2; 0	MYA1; 0	PLE2; 1	2½
43	Thanadon Kulpruethanon (THA)	UAE1; 0	PLE2; 1	BAN1; 0	KAZ2; 0	NEP2 ½	PLE1; 1	MYA1; 0	2½
44	Abdalsalam Al-Bazzour (PLE)	QAT2; 0	SRI1; 0	SRI2; 0	KOR2; 1	PLE2 ½	THA2; 0	MDV2; 1	2½
45	Ahn Sung-min (KOR)	INA1; 0	KOR1; 0	NEP1; 0	PLE1; 0	MDV1; 1	MDV2; 1	SIN2; 0	2
46	Mohamed Hassan (MDV)	SIN1; 0	BRU1; 0	IRI1; 0	MAC1; 0	KOR2; 0	PLE2; 1	MAC2; 1	2
47	Li Hui (MAC)	VIE2; 0	UAE2 ½	MYA1; 0	MDV1; 1	JPN1; 0	YEM2; 0	NEP1; 0	1½
48	Joel Celis (MAC)	BAN2; 0	MYA2; 0	PLE2; 1	BRU1; 0	UAE2; 0	LIB1; 0	MDV1; 0	1
49	Ahmed Ashraf (MDV)	BAN1; 0	THA1; 0	LIB1; 0	PLE2; 1	NEP1; 0	KOR2; 0	PLE1; 0	1
50	Muath Al-Hanafi (PLE)	JPN2; 0	THA2; 0	MAC2; 0	MDV2; 0	PLE1 ½	MDV1; 0	SRI2; 0	½

=== Women's individual standard ===
30 June – 3 July

Rank	Athlete	R1	R2	R3	R4	R5	R6	R7	Pts
1st place, gold medalist(s)	Hou Yifan (CHN)	MGL1; 1	AOI1; 1	INA1; 1	VIE2; 1	CHN2 ½	UZB1; 1	PHI1; 1	6½
2nd place, silver medalist(s)	Zhao Xue (CHN)	BAN2; 1	AOI2; 1	INA2; 1	IRI1; 1	CHN1 ½	AOI1 ½	INA1; 1	6
3rd place, bronze medalist(s)	Bhakti Kulkarni (AOI)	JPN1; 1	CHN1; 0	UAE1; 1	UZB2; 1	IRI2; 1	CHN2 ½	VIE2; 1	5½
4	Guliskhan Nakhbayeva (KAZ)	THA1; 1	UZB2; 0	UZB1; 0	SYR1; 1	LIB1; 1	INA2; 1	AOI2; 1	5
5	Zhu Chen (QAT)	LIB1; 1	VIE1; 1	IRI1; 0	BAN1; 1	KAZ2 ½	INA1 ½	MGL1; 1	5
6	Irene Kharisma Sukandar (INA)	SRI1; 1	BAN1; 1	CHN1; 0	PHI1; 1	SIN1; 1	QAT1 ½	CHN2; 0	4½
7	Janelle Mae Frayna (PHI)	MDV1; 1	IRI2 ½	MGL2; 1	INA1; 0	SIN2; 1	KAZ2; 1	CHN1; 0	4½
8	Mitra Hejazipour (IRI)	UAE2; 1	MDV2; 1	QAT1; 1	CHN2; 0	UZB1; 0	SIN1 ½	UZB2; 1	4½
9	Nafisa Muminova (UZB)	JPN2; 1	MGL2 ½	KAZ1; 1	IRI2 ½	IRI1; 1	CHN1; 0	KAZ2 ½	4½
10	Sara Khademalsharieh (IRI)	SYR2; 1	PHI1 ½	SIN1; 1	UZB1 ½	AOI1; 0	UZB2 ½	BAN2; 1	4½
11	Bayarjargalyn Bayarmaa (MGL)	CHN1; 0	JPN1; 1	PLE2; 1	INA2; 0	SYR2; 1	PHI2; 1	QAT1; 0	4
12	Nguyễn Thị Thanh An (VIE)	QAT2; 1	QAT1; 0	THA1; 1	SIN1; 0	AOI2; 0	SYR1; 1	LIB1; 1	4
13	Kholoud Al-Zarouni (UAE)	VIE2; 0	THA2; 1	AOI1; 0	QAT2; 1	BAN1; 0	SRI2; 1	SIN2; 1	4
14	Jeslin Tay (SIN)	PLE2; 1	KAZ2; 1	IRI2; 0	VIE1; 1	INA1; 0	IRI1 ½	BAN1 ½	4
15	Phạm Lê Thảo Nguyên (VIE)	UAE1; 1	PHI2; 1	UZB2; 1	CHN1; 0	INA2 ½	AOI2 ½	AOI1; 0	4
16	Medina Warda Aulia (INA)	NEP1; 1	SIN2; 1	CHN2; 0	MGL1; 1	VIE2 ½	KAZ1; 0	MGL2 ½	4
17	Subbaraman Meenakshi (AOI)	THA2; 1	CHN2; 0	SRI1; 1	SIN2 ½	VIE1; 1	VIE2 ½	KAZ1; 0	4
18	Madina Davletbayeva (KAZ)	SYR1; 1	SIN1; 0	LIB1; 1	PHI2; 1	QAT1 ½	PHI1; 0	UZB1 ½	4
19	Shamima Akter Liza (BAN)	KOR2; 1	INA1; 0	SYR2; 1	QAT1; 0	UAE1; 1	BAN2 ½	SIN1 ½	4
20	Uuganbayaryn Lkhamsüren (MGL)	KOR1; 1	UZB1 ½	PHI1; 0	UAE2 ½	THA1 ½	JPN2; 1	INA2 ½	4
21	Gulrukhbegim Tokhirjonova (UZB)	NEP2; 1	KAZ1; 1	VIE2; 0	AOI1; 0	NEP1; 1	IRI2 ½	IRI1; 0	3½
22	Hazel Liu (SIN)	PLE1; 1	INA2; 0	SYR1; 1	AOI2 ½	PHI1; 0	THA1; 1	UAE1; 0	3½
23	Catherine Perena (PHI)	SRI2; 1	VIE2; 0	MDV2; 1	KAZ2; 0	JPN2 ½	MGL1; 0	SYR2; 1	3½
24	Sachini Ranasinghe (SRI)	INA1; 0	KOR2; 1	AOI2; 0	MDV1; 1	BAN2; 0	JPN1; 1	QAT2 ½	3½
25	Aisha Al-Khelaifi (QAT)	VIE1; 0	LIB1; 0	NEP2; 1	UAE1; 0	MDV1; 1	NEP1; 1	SRI1 ½	3½
26	Sharmin Sultana Shirin (BAN)	CHN2; 0	UAE2 ½	JPN2; 1	NEP1 ½	SRI1; 1	BAN1 ½	IRI2; 0	3½
27	Doha Farha (SYR)	KAZ2; 0	MDV1; 1	SIN2; 0	KAZ1; 0	KOR2; 1	VIE1; 0	SRI2; 1	3
28	Emi Hasegawa (JPN)	AOI1; 0	MGL1; 0	NEP1; 0	NEP2; 1	KOR1; 1	SRI1; 0	KOR2; 1	3
29	Chanida Taweesupmun (THA)	KAZ1; 0	SRI2; 1	VIE1; 0	MDV2; 1	MGL2 ½	SIN2; 0	UAE2 ½	3
30	Narumi Uchida (JPN)	UZB1; 0	KOR1; 1	BAN2; 0	PLE2; 1	PHI2 ½	MGL2; 0	THA2 ½	3
31	Worasuda Atthaworadej (THA)	AOI2; 0	UAE1; 0	KOR2; 1	LIB1; 0	UAE2; 1	SYR2 ½	JPN2 ½	3
32	Monalisa Khamboo (NEP)	INA2; 0	PLE1 ½	JPN1; 1	BAN2 ½	UZB2; 0	QAT2; 0	MDV1; 1	3
33	Oh Min-ah (KOR)	MGL2; 0	JPN2; 0	SRI2; 0	BYE; 1	JPN1; 0	PLE2; 1	NEP2; 1	3
34	Amna Nuaman Al-Ali (UAE)	IRI1; 0	BAN2 ½	PLE1; 1	MGL2 ½	THA2; 0	LIB1 ½	THA1 ½	3
35	Anwaar Al-Bazzour (PLE)	SIN2; 0	NEP1 ½	UAE2; 0	KOR2; 0	MDV2; 1	NEP2 ½	BYE; 1	3
36	Maya Jalloul (LIB)	QAT1; 0	QAT2; 1	KAZ2; 0	THA2; 1	KAZ1; 0	UAE2 ½	VIE1; 0	2½
37	Fatemah Al-Jeldah (SYR)	IRI2; 0	NEP2; 1	BAN1; 0	SRI2; 1	MGL1; 0	THA2 ½	PHI2; 0	2½
38	Nelunika Methmani (SRI)	PHI2; 0	THA1; 0	KOR1; 1	SYR2; 0	PLE2; 1	UAE1; 0	SYR1; 0	2
39	Nihaya Ahmed (MDV)	PHI1; 0	SYR1; 0	BYE; 1	SRI1; 0	QAT2; 0	MDV2; 1	NEP1; 0	2
40	Cho Yeon-hee (KOR)	BAN1; 0	SRI1; 0	THA2; 0	PLE1; 1	SYR1; 0	BYE; 1	JPN1; 0	2
41	Hadil Jaradat (PLE)	SIN1; 0	BYE; 1	MGL1; 0	JPN2; 0	SRI2; 0	KOR1; 0	MDV2; 1	2
42	Bina Jaiswal (NEP)	UZB2; 0	SYR2; 0	QAT2; 0	JPN1; 0	BYE; 1	PLE1 ½	KOR1; 0	1½
43	Aminath Hasha Hussain (MDV)	BYE; 1	IRI1; 0	PHI2; 0	THA1; 0	PLE1; 0	MDV1; 0	PLE2; 0	1

=== Mixed team blitz ===
6 July

==== Swiss round ====
Rank	Team	R1	R2	R3	R4	R5	MP	GP
1	China (CHN)	BAN; 3–1	AOI; 4–0	IRI; 2½–1½	VIE; 2½–1½	PHI; 4–0	10	16
2	Uzbekistan (UZB)	MDV; 4–0	INA; 2–2	KAZ; 1–3	SIN; 4–0	IRI; 4–0	7	15
3	Vietnam (VIE)	SIN; 3–1	MGL; 3–1	PHI; 3½–½	CHN; 1½–2½	KAZ; 2–2	7	13
4	Indonesia (INA)	SYR; 3–1	UZB; 2–2	AOI; 2–2	QAT; 2–2	MGL; 3–1	7	12
5	Bangladesh (BAN)	CHN; 1–3	THA; 4–0	SIN ½–3½	JPN; 4–0	SRI; 3–1	6	12½
6	Qatar (QAT)	KOR; 4–0	IRI; 0–4	SYR; 4–0	INA; 2–2	AOI; 2–2	6	12
7	Kazakhstan (KAZ)	UAE; 3–1	PHI; 1½–2½	UZB; 3–1	MGL; 2–2	VIE; 2–2	6	11½
8	Independent Olympic Athletes (AOI)	THA; 3–1	CHN; 0–4	INA; 2–2	KOR; 4–0	QAT; 2–2	6	11
9	Singapore (SIN)	VIE; 1–3	SRI; 3–1	BAN; 3½–½	UZB; 0–4	UAE; 3–1	6	10½
10	Philippines (PHI)	NEP; 3½–½	KAZ; 2½–1½	VIE ½–3½	IRI; 2½–1½	CHN; 0–4	6	9
11	Mongolia (MGL)	SRI; 3–1	VIE; 1–3	UAE; 3–1	KAZ; 2–2	INA; 1–3	5	10
12	Iran (IRI)	JPN; 4–0	QAT; 4–0	CHN; 1½–2½	PHI; 1½–2½	UZB; 0–4	4	11
13	United Arab Emirates (UAE)	KAZ; 1–3	NEP; 3–1	MGL; 1–3	SYR; 3–1	SIN; 1–3	4	9
14	Syria (SYR)	INA; 1–3	MDV; 4–0	QAT; 0–4	UAE; 1–3	NEP; 3–1	4	9
15	Thailand (THA)	AOI; 1–3	BAN; 0–4	JPN; 2–2	SRI; 2–2	KOR; 3–1	4	8
16	Japan (JPN)	IRI; 0–4	KOR; 2–2	THA; 2–2	BAN; 0–4	MDV; 4–0	4	8
17	Sri Lanka (SRI)	MGL; 1–3	SIN; 1–3	MDV; 4–0	THA; 2–2	BAN; 1–3	3	9
18	South Korea (KOR)	QAT; 0–4	JPN; 2–2	NEP; 3–1	AOI; 0–4	THA; 1–3	3	6
19	Nepal (NEP)	PHI ½–3½	UAE; 1–3	KOR; 1–3	MDV; 3–1	SYR; 1–3	2	6½
20	Maldives (MDV)	UZB; 0–4	SYR; 0–4	SRI; 0–4	NEP; 1–3	JPN; 0–4	0	1

==== Knockout round ====
Semifinals
China	3½
Indonesia	½
Uzbekistan	½
Vietnam	3½

Final
China	1
Vietnam	3
Bronze medal match
Indonesia	2½
Uzbekistan	1½

=== Mixed team rapid ===
==== Swiss round ====
4–5 July

Rank	Team	R1	R2	R3	R4	R5	MP	GP
1	Vietnam (VIE)	SIN; 3½–½	UZB; 4–0	AOI; 2½–1½	PHI; 3–1	CHN; 2½–1½	10	15½
2	Iran (IRI)	UAE; 4–0	QAT; 3–1	PHI; 1½–2½	INA; 2½–1½	MGL; 2½–1½	8	13½
3	Independent Olympic Athletes (AOI)	SYR; 4–0	MGL; 3½–½	VIE; 1½–2½	BAN; 3½–½	PHI; 2–2	7	14½
4	China (CHN)	BAN; 3–1	INA; 2–2	KAZ; 3½–½	QAT; 3½–½	VIE; 1½–2½	7	13½
5	Indonesia (INA)	THA; 3½–½	CHN; 2–2	UZB; 2½–1½	IRI; 1½–2½	UAE; 3½–½	7	13
6	Philippines (PHI)	KOR; 4–0	KAZ; 2½–1½	IRI; 2½–1½	VIE; 1–3	AOI; 2–2	7	12
7	Kazakhstan (KAZ)	JPN; 4–0	PHI; 1½–2½	CHN ½–3½	SIN; 2½–1½	SRI; 4–0	6	12½
8	Mongolia (MGL)	MDV; 4–0	AOI ½–3½	UAE; 2½–1½	SYR; 3–1	IRI; 1½–2½	6	11½
9	Qatar (QAT)	SRI; 3–1	IRI; 1–3	SIN; 3–1	CHN ½–3½	SYR; 3½–½	6	11
10	Uzbekistan (UZB)	NEP; 4–0	VIE; 0–4	INA; 1½–2½	JPN; 4–0	BAN; 2–2	5	11½
11	Bangladesh (BAN)	CHN; 1–3	THA; 3½–½	JPN; 3–1	AOI ½–3½	UZB; 2–2	5	10
12	Singapore (SIN)	VIE ½–3½	NEP; 4–0	QAT; 1–3	KAZ; 1½–2½	KOR; 3–1	4	10
13	Sri Lanka (SRI)	QAT; 1–3	UAE; 1½–2½	KOR; 2½–1½	MDV; 4–0	KAZ; 0–4	4	9
14	Syria (SYR)	AOI; 0–4	MDV; 4–0	THA; 3–1	MGL; 1–3	QAT ½–3½	4	8½
15	Japan (JPN)	KAZ; 0–4	KOR; 3–1	BAN; 1–3	UZB; 0–4	NEP; 4–0	4	8
16	United Arab Emirates (UAE)	IRI; 0–4	SRI; 2½–1½	MGL; 1½–2½	NEP; 3–1	INA ½–3½	4	7½
17	South Korea (KOR)	PHI; 0–4	JPN; 1–3	SRI; 1½–2½	THA; 4–0	SIN; 1–3	2	7½
18	Thailand (THA)	INA ½–3½	BAN ½–3½	SYR; 1–3	KOR; 0–4	MDV; 4–0	2	6
19	Nepal (NEP)	UZB; 0–4	SIN; 0–4	MDV; 2½–1½	UAE; 1–3	JPN; 0–4	2	3½
20	Maldives (MDV)	MGL; 0–4	SYR; 0–4	NEP; 1½–2½	SRI; 0–4	THA; 0–4	0	1½

==== Knockout round ====
5 July

Semifinals
Vietnam	1½
China	2½
Iran	1½
Independent Olympic Athletes	2½

Final
China	3
Independent Olympic Athletes	1
Bronze medal match
Vietnam	2
Iran	2
