= Ranindu Dilshan Liyanage =

Sri Lankan chess player (born 2003)

Personal information
- Born: 2003 (age 22–23)

Chess career
- Country: Sri Lanka
- Title: International Master (2023)
- FIDE rating: 2470 (October 2026)
- Peak rating: 2475 (November 2026)

Ranindu Dilshan Liyanage also simply known as Ranindu Liyanage (born 2003) is a Sri Lankan chess player and 2020 national champion. In July 2021, he became the first Sri Lankan man to participate at the FIDE Chess World Cup. He is currently coached by Uzbekistani grandmaster Alexei Barsov.

== Career ==
Ranindu pursued his interest in chess in 2009 when he was studying in primary grades at the Asoka Primary School in Kalagedihena, Gampaha. He then moved to Ananda College in Grade 3. He was coached by veteran national chess player Suneetha Wijesuriya in Ananda College. He was later coached by Sri Lankan international master Romesh Weerawardane in 2013.

In 2016, he was part of the Under-14 national chess team which claimed the bronze medal at the Asian Nations Cup which was held in China. He also clinched a bronze medal in the Under 14 age category event at the 2017 West Asian Youth Asian Chess Championship which was held in Sri Lanka. He was granted the Candidate Master title in 2017 by the World Chess Championship. He also represented the Sri Lanka Under 16 chess team at the 2018 World Youth Chess Championship which was held in Turkey.

In October 2020, Ranindu won his first national chess championship title at the age of 16 and became the first schoolboy from Ananda College to become national champion after 20 years. He also later emerged as a winner of the Sri Lanka Chess Grand Prix 2021. He also claimed bronze medal at the 2021 Asian Hybrid Chess Championship. In May 2021, he was part of the Sri Jayawardenepura University team which emerged as winners at the 2021 Sri Lanka National Inter Club Chess Championship.

Ranindu also took part in the Chess World Cup 2021 which is being held in Sochi, Russia. He also went onto become the first Sri Lankan male as well as the second Sri Lankan after Sachini Ranasinghe to represent Sri Lanka at the Chess World Cup. He was defeated by Russian grandmaster Grigoriy Oparin in a hard-fought match in the round one of the 2021 World Cup tournament.
