= Thilakarathne =

Thilakarathne (Sinhala: තිලකරත්න) is a surname. Notable people with the surname include:

- Harshana Thilakarathne (born 2003), Sri Lankan chess player
- Umali Thilakarathne, Sri Lankan actress
