= Lebanese Chess Championship =

The first official Lebanese Chess Championship was held in 1953. Lebanese chess players had organized a tournament in 1943 to determine an unofficial champion. The championship has been held regularly, except in the war years of 1969, 1973, and 1975 to 1991. Edgard Chalabi's death caused the 1963 championship to be skipped, and no championship was held in 2006. The women's championship began in 1994.

Men and women play together in a single tournament. The top scorer wins the men's (overall) championship, the top female scorer wins the women's championship. In 2005, 22-year-old WIM Knarik Mouradian became the first woman to win the men's championship, winning eight games, drawing three, and losing none (9.5/11). FM Ahmad Najjar finished second. In 2007 they exchanged places, with Najjar winning the men's championship with 8.0/9 and Mouradian in second place a half point behind with 7.5/9 to win the women's championship.

== Results ==
1953	Charles Salameh	–				
1955	Georges Malias	–				
1956	Edgard Chalabi	–				
1957	Serge Majarov	–				
1958	Edgard Chalabi	–				
1959	Carlos Maalouf	–				
1960	Serge Majarov	–				
1961	Fares Farah	–				
1962	Serge Majarov	–				
1964	Charles Salameh	–				
1965	Jacques Bedros	–				
1966	Maurice Gabriel	–				
1967	Antoine Ghaleb	–				
1968	Charles Salameh	–				
1970	Samir Sursock	–				
1971	Samir Sursock	–				
1972	Andre Tarazi	–				
1974	Safwan Akkari	–				
1992	Samir Sursock	–				
1993	Mounir Tawbeh	–	Wissam Hajj Ali	1994	Fadi Eid	Danielle Ghattas
1995	Antoine Kassis	Suzan Mouradian				
1996	Ahmad Najjar	Knarik Mouradian				
1997	Mansour Assaf	Knarik Mouradian				
1998	Fadi Eid	Knarik Mouradian				
1999	Ahmad Najjar	Suzan Mouradian				
2000	Abdulaziz Mahmoud	Knarik Mouradian				
2001	Haytham Omar	Knarik Mouradian				
2002	Faysal Khairallah	Suzan Mouradian				
2003	Faysal Khairallah	Suzan Mouradian				
2004	Faysal Khairallah	Knarik Mouradian				
2005	Knarik Mouradian	Suzan Mouradian				
2007	Najjar Ahmad	Knarik Mouradian				
2008	Faysal Khairallah	Knarik Mouradian				
2009	Fadi Eid	Maya Jalloul				
2010	Amro El Jawich	Knarik Mouradian				
2011	Faysal Khairallah					
2012	Faysal Khairallah					
2013	Ibrahim Chahrour					
2014	Faysal Khairallah					
2015	Amro El Jawich					
2016	Faysal Khairallah					
2018	Antoine Kassis					
2019	Antoine Kassis					
