= Suneetha Wijesuriya =

Sri Lankan chess player (born 1963)

Personal information
- Born: Suneetha Godigamuwage Wijesuriya; 18 June 1963 (age 63) Megoda, Kolonnawa

Chess career
- Country: Sri Lanka
- Title: Woman FIDE Master (2012)
- Peak rating: 2020 (July 1996)

Suneetha Godigamuwage Wijesuriya (born 18 June 1963) is a veteran Sri Lankan chess player and coach. She won Sri Lanka's first ever gold medal at a World Chess Olympiad when she achieved it during the 30th Chess Olympiad which was held in Manila in 1992. Up to date, she remains as the only chess player to have won a gold medal at a World Chess Olympiad for Sri Lanka. She has also won the Sri Lankan Women's National Chess Championship title ten times (1980, 1982, 1983, 1984, 1985, 1986, 1987, 1988, 1995 and 1997). She is well known for her efforts in developing the game of chess across the country.

== Biography ==
She was born on 18 June 1963 in Megoda, Kolonnawa. She was born as the second child in her family and she has three siblings. Her sister Vineetha Wijesuriya, her brothers Shelton Wijesuriya and Lakshman Wijesuriya were also notable chess players who played the game at national level.

== Career ==
She initially had no knowledge about the game of chess as she had not even played it during childhood. She only began playing chess in 1978 at the age of 17 when she was pursuing her Advanced Level education at the Sri Rajasinghe Central College in Kudabuthgamuwa.

Her English language tuition teacher W. A. D. de Zoysa became her first chess coach. She eventually competed in the inaugural edition of the Sri Lanka Women's National Chess Championship which was held in 1979 and she subsequently finished as runners-up in the women's singles final. She brought her first chess board with the prixe money which she earned for her second place finish at the 1979 National Chess Championship. She claimed her first national title in 1980 and also continued her dominance at national level by pocketing seven consecutive national titles from 1982 to 1988.

She created history at the 1992 World Chess Olympiad after securing a gold medal in the competition. It became only the second major sporting achievement for Sri Lanka at global level after Muhammad Lafir's world title triumph during the 1973 World Amateur Snooker Championship. She attained individual points about 6.5 points out of 8 points winning 6, drew one and losing just one game during the 30th Chess Olympiad. She took part at 30th World Chess Olympiad along with her younger sister Vineetha and younger brother Laxman.

She also took part at the 1996 World Chess Olympiad which was held in Armenia and registered 7 wins out of 11 games. She surprisingly decided to quit playing chess after realising that she did not get much attention from Sri Lankans despite her gold medal success and instead started promoting it in various parts of Sri Lanka. The lack of knowledge about chess among Sri Lankans during that time also prompted Suneetha to make awareness about the game.

She initially worked with the Sri Lanka Chess Federation to popularise and develop chess in Sri Lanka. In 1994, she conducted a simultaneous chess exhibition at the BMICH to promote the board game and she won 15 games during the exhibition. Then Sri Lankan President J. R. Jayawardene attended the exhibition chess event as the chief guest.

She approached the Russian Cultural Centre in Colombo in 1997 with an intention to promote the game throughout Sri Lanka. She also later founded the Anatoly Karpov Chess Club in 1998 at the Independence Memorial Hall, Colombo and also served as its chief instructor. Under her leadership at the Anatoly Karpov Chess Club over 500 free chess coaching camps had been conducted in various parts of Sri Lanka in schools, institutes and coaching camps have also been held for Sri Lanka Army and Sri Lanka Navy.

She has also coached many young chess players in Sri Lanka including the likes of Sachini Ranasinghe who went onto become the first Sri Lankan woman FIDE International Master.

== Honours ==
She was awarded the Women FIDE Master title in 2012. She received the FIDE instructor's title in 2014.

She received the SLT Silk Award for Outstanding Dedication and Contribution to Promote Sports at the inaugural edition of the SLT Silk Sports Awards in 2017. She was awarded the SLT Silk Award exactly on her 25th anniversary since winning the gold medal at the 1992 World Chess Olympiad.

She was awarded the title of Kreeda Ratna at the 2019 Presidential Awards.

The International Chess Federation has named 2022 as the year of Women Chess and Suneetha was awarded the Outstanding Game Changer of Chess in Asia
