= Harshana =

Harshana (Sinhala: හර්ෂණ; Tamil: ஹர்ஷன) is a name found in Sri Lanka. It can be both a masculine given name and a middle name. Notable people with this name include:

- Harshana Godamanna (born 1985), a Sri Lankan tennis player
- Harshana Rajakaruna (born 1980), a Sri Lankan politician
- Harshana Suriyapperuma, Sri Lankan politician
- Harshana Thilakarathne (born 2003), a Sri Lankan chess player
- Hashan Harshana James (born 1993), a Sri Lankan cricketer

== See also ==
- Haryana, a state of India
