= Minul Doluweera =

Sri Lankan chess player (born 2000)

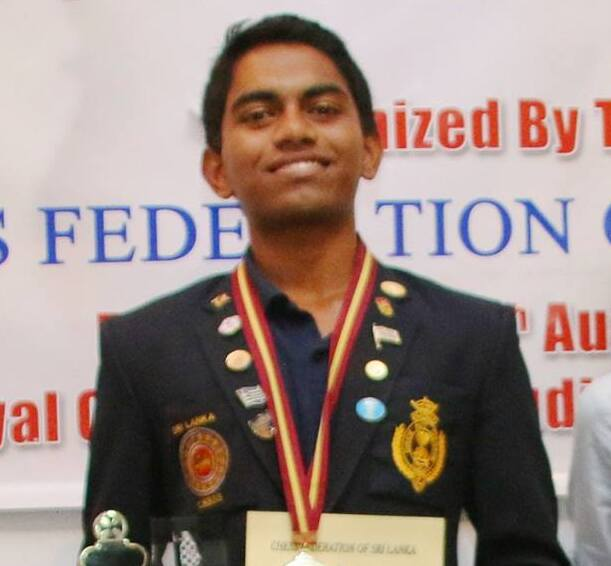

Personal information
- Born: 2000 (age 25–26) Colombo, Sri Lanka

Chess career
- Country: Sri Lanka
- Title: FIDE Master (2017)
- Peak rating: 2255 (January 2018)

Minul Sanjula Doluweera is a Sri Lankan chess player.

== Chess career ==
In 2017, he won the Sri Lankan Chess Championship.

In February 2021, he tied for first place with Ranindu Dilshan Liyanage in the Sri Lanka Grand Prix, though lost in the tiebreak games and was finished as the runner-up.

He played for Sri Lanka with Chathura Jayaweera and P. K. Ranasinghe in the Asian University Chess Championship.

== Personal life ==
He attended Royal College, Colombo and the University of Colombo.
