= Iran at the 2013 Asian Indoor and Martial Arts Games =

- IOC code: IRI
- NOC: National Olympic Committee of the Islamic Republic of Iran

in Incheon
- Competitors: 82 in 9 sports
- Flag bearer: Vahid Shafiei
- Medals Ranked 6th: Gold 3 Silver 6 Bronze 2 Total 11

Asian Indoor and Martial Arts Games appearances
- 2005; 2007; 2009; 2013; 2017; 2021; 2026

Iran participated in the 2013 Asian Indoor and Martial Arts Games in Incheon, South Korea from 29 June to 6 July 2013.

== Competitors ==
Sport	Men	Women	Total
Bowling	2		2
Chess	3	3	6
Cue sports	6	3	9
Esports	7		7
Futsal	14	14	28
Indoor kabaddi	7	7	14
Kurash	3	2	5
Muaythai	3	2	5
Short course swimming	6		6
Total	51	31	82

== Medal summary ==
=== Medals by sport ===
Sport	Gold	Silver	Bronze	Total
Cue sports		1		1
Futsal	1	1		2
Indoor kabaddi		2		2
Kurash	1	1	1	3
Muaythai	1	1	1	3
Total	3	6	2	11

=== Medalists ===
Medal	Name	Sport	Event
Gold	Alireza Samimi; Taha Mortazavi; Vahid Shafiei; Mohammad Keshavarz; Meisam Khayyam; Alireza Vafaei; Ali Asghar Hassanzadeh; Ghodrat Bahadori; Hossein Tayyebi; Mohammad Taheri; Ali Kiaei; Sepehr Mohammadi; Farhad Tavakkoli; Mehdi Javid	Futsal	Men
Gold	Elias Aliakbari	Kurash	Men's 73 kg
Gold	Vahid Shahbazi	Muaythai	Men's 63.5 kg
Silver	Amir Sarkhosh	Cue sports	Men's six-red snooker singles
Silver	Farzaneh Tavassoli; Paria Norouzi; Nasimeh Gholami; Fereshteh Karimi; Soheila Malmoli; Sepideh Zarinrad; Leila Eghbali; Niloufar Ardalan; Fahimeh Zareei; Fatemeh Etedadi; Nastaran Moghimi; Arezoo Sadaghianizadeh; Naghmeh Moradi; Behnaz Khayyat	Futsal	Women
Silver	Kianoush Naderian; Meraj Sheikh; Abolfazl Maghsoudloo; Esmaeil Maghsoudloo; Fazel Atrachali; Navid Nazari; Farhad Rahimi	Indoor kabaddi	Men
Silver	Samira Shabani; Salimeh Abdollahbakhsh; Marzieh Eshghi; Farideh Zarifdoust; Sedigheh Jafari; Sahar Ilat; Hengameh Bourghani	Indoor kabaddi	Women
Silver	Somayyeh Heidari	Kurash	Women's 57 kg
Silver	Masoud Minaei	Muaythai	Men's 67 kg
Bronze	Saeid Khosravinejad	Kurash	Men's +90 kg
Bronze	Issa Alamdar	Muaythai	Men's 71 kg

== Results by event ==
=== Bowling ===
Athlete	Event	Preliminary		Knockout round			
Athlete	Event	Score	Rank	Quarterfinal	Semifinal	Final	Rank
Hamid Reza Seyed-Azizollah	Men's singles	1080	65	Did not advance			
Hossein Vanaki	Men's singles	982	73	Did not advance			
Hossein Vanaki; Hamid Reza Seyed-Azizollah	Men's doubles	2098	34	Did not advance			

=== Chess ===
Individual standard

Athlete	Event	Swiss round							Rank
Athlete	Event	Round 1	Round 2	Round 3	Round 4	Round 5	Round 6	Round 7	Rank
Pouria Darini	Men	Akhras (SYR); L 0–1	Hamal (NEP); L WO	Hassan (MDV); W 1–0	Lee (KOR); D ½–½	Charaf (LIB); W 1–0	Mohammad (SYR); D ½–½	Hamal (NEP); W 1–0	20
Ehsan Ghaemmaghami	Men	Kyaw (MYA); D ½–½	Filippov (UZB); D ½–½	Mohammad (SYR); D ½–½	Nanjo (JPN); W 1–0	Firmansyah (INA); D ½–½	Gündavaa (MGL); D ½–½	Goh (SIN); D ½–½	23
Mitra Hejazipour	Women	Al-Ali (UAE); W 1–0	Hussain (MDV); W 1–0	Zhu (QAT); W 1–0	Zhao (CHN); L 0–1	Muminova (UZB); L 0–1	Tay (SIN); D ½–½	Tokhirjonova (UZB); W 1–0	8
Sara Khademalsharieh	Women	Al-Jeldah (SYR); W 1–0	Frayna (PHI); D ½–½	Tay (SIN); W 1–0	Muminova (UZB); D ½–½	Kulkarni (AOI); L 0–1	Tokhirjonova (UZB); D ½–½	Shirin (BAN); W 1–0	10

Mixed team

Athlete	Event	Swiss round						Semifinal	Final	Rank
Athlete	Event	Round 1	Round 2	Round 3	Round 4	Round 5	Rank	Semifinal	Final	Rank
Ehsan Ghaemmaghami; Asghar Golizadeh; Pouria Darini; Atousa Pourkashian; Mitra Hejazipour; Sara Khademalsharieh	Blitz	Japan; W 4–0	Qatar; W 4–0	China; L 1½–2½	Philippines; L 1½–2½	Uzbekistan; L 0–4	12	Did not advance		12
Ehsan Ghaemmaghami; Asghar Golizadeh; Pouria Darini; Atousa Pourkashian; Mitra Hejazipour; Sara Khademalsharieh	Rapid	United Arab Emirates; W 4–0	Qatar; W 3–1	Philippines; L 1½–2½	Indonesia; W 2½–1½	Mongolia; W 2½–1½	2 Q	Independent Olympic Athletes; L 1½–2½	3rd place match Vietnam; L 2–2	4

=== Cue sports ===
Athlete	Event	Round of 64	Round of 32	Round of 16	Quarterfinal	Semifinal	Final	Rank
Amir Sarkhosh	Men's English billiards	—N/a	Al-Harthy (OMA); W WO	Gilchrist (SIN); L 0–3	Did not advance			9
Soheil Vahedi	Men's English billiards	—N/a	Al-Jifri (KSA); W 3–0	Nguyễn (VIE); L 2–3	Did not advance			9
Mohammad Ali Pordel	Men's nine-ball	Bye	Fayaz (MDV); W 9–1	Li (CHN); L 6–9	Did not advance			9
Takhti Zarekani	Men's nine-ball	Bye	Kanjanasri (THA); W 9–4	Toh (SIN); L 7–9	Did not advance			9
Ehsan Heidarinejad	Men's snooker	Bye	Kurimoto (JPN); W 4–1	Senzahi (AFG); W 4–1	Ding (CHN); L 1–4	Did not advance		5
Hossein Vafaei	Men's snooker	Sagyndykov (KGZ); W 4–0	Hassan (MAS); W 4–3	Chau (HKG); W 4–2	Cao (CHN); L 0–4	Did not advance		5
Ehsan Heidarinejad; Hossein Vafaei; Soheil Vahedi	Men's snooker team	—N/a	Saudi Arabia; W 3–0	Japan; W 3–0	Independent Olympic Athletes; L 2–3	Did not advance		5
Amir Sarkhosh	Men's six-red snooker	Bye	Al-Owais (KUW); W 5–0	Yu (CHN); W 5–4	Lim (SIN); W 5–1	Al-Kojah (SYR); W 5–2	Xiao (CHN); L 4–5	2nd place, silver medalist(s)
Hossein Vafaei	Men's six-red snooker	Ratbekov (KGZ); W WO	Ham (KOR); W 5–0	Mahameed (PLE); W 5–3	Al-Obaidly (QAT); L 3–5	Did not advance		5
Aisan Malekara	Women's nine-ball	—N/a	Cha (KOR); L 0–7	Did not advance				17
Aisan Malekara	Women's ten-ball	—N/a	Uyanga (MGL); L 3–7	Did not advance				17
Tahereh Eslami	Women's six-red snooker	—N/a	Otgonbayar (MGL); W 4–2	Ng (HKG); L 1–4	Did not advance			9
Mandana Farhadi	Women's six-red snooker	—N/a	Ip (HKG); L 0–4	Did not advance				17

=== Esports ===
Athlete	Event	Preliminary round						Quarterfinal	Semifinal	Final	Rank
Athlete	Event	Round 1	Round 2	Round 3	Round 4	Round 5	Rank	Quarterfinal	Semifinal	Final	Rank
Davoud Khoei	FIFA	Mullokandov (KAZ); W 1–0	Muminov (TJK); W 1–0	Basulaiman (QAT); W 1–0	—N/a		1 Q	Mullokandov (KAZ); W 2–1	Chen (CHN); L 0–2	3rd place match Chew (MAS); L 1–2	4
Morteza Montazerozzohour	FIFA	Tô (VIE); W 1–0	Saprikin (UZB); D 0–0	—N/a			1 Q	Saprikin (UZB); L 0–2	Did not advance		5
Hadi Basiri	Need for Speed	Score: 35					3	—N/a		Did not advance	5
Mohammad Ali Moghavem	StarCraft	Lee (KOR); L WO	Tsogt (MGL); L WO	Li (CHN); L WO	Chen (TPE); L WO	—N/a	5	—N/a	Did not advance		9
Shahriar Shaki	StarCraft	Kim (KOR); L 0–1	Yang (TPE); L 0–1	Hu (CHN); W 1–0	—N/a		3	—N/a	Did not advance		5
Farzan Homaei	Tekken	Bae (KOR); L 0–1	Salakhitdinov (TJK); W WO	Khosbayar (MGL); L 0–1	Chen (TPE); L 0–1	—N/a	4	—N/a	Did not advance		7
Arvin Shayegan	Tekken	Abbas (MDV); L 0–1	Shih (TPE); L 0–1	Kim (KOR); L WO	Tomar (AOI); L WO	Mönkhbold (MGL); L WO	6	—N/a	Did not advance		11

=== Futsal ===
Team	Event	Preliminary round					Quarterfinal	Semifinal	Final	Rank
Team	Event	Round 1	Round 2	Round 3	Round 4	Rank	Quarterfinal	Semifinal	Final	Rank
Iran	Men	United Arab Emirates; W 13–0	Iraq; W 12–3	—N/a		1 Q	China; W 8–0	Thailand; W 5–4	Japan; W 5–2	1st place, gold medalist(s)
Iran	Women	Malaysia; W 6–1	Thailand; W 1–0	Vietnam; W 1–0	Hong Kong; W 5–0	1 Q	—N/a	Indonesia; W 4–0	Japan; L 1–2	2nd place, silver medalist(s)
Roster – Men: Alireza Samimi; Taha Mortazavi; Vahid Shafiei; Mohammad Keshavarz; Meisam Khayyam; Alireza Vafaei; Ali Asghar Hassanzadeh; Ghodrat Bahadori; Hossein Tayyebi; Mohammad Taheri; Ali Kiaei; Sepehr Mohammadi; Farhad Tavakkoli; Mehdi Javid; Coach: (Spain) Jesús Candelas Roster – Women: Farzaneh Tavassoli; Paria Norouzi; Nasimeh Gholami; Fereshteh Karimi; Soheila Malmoli; Sepideh Zarinrad; Leila Eghbali; Niloufar Ardalan; Fahimeh Zareei; Fatemeh Etedadi; Nastaran Moghimi; Arezoo Sadaghianizadeh; Naghmeh Moradi; Behnaz Khayyat; Coach: Shahrzad Mozaffar

=== Indoor kabaddi ===
Team	Event	Round robin / Preliminary round						Semifinal	Final	Rank
Team	Event	Round 1	Round 2	Round 3	Round 4	Round 5	Rank	Semifinal	Final	Rank
Iran	Men	Japan; W 51–28	Turkmenistan; W 72–20	Thailand; W 58–27	South Korea; W 35–31	Independent Olympic Athletes; L 28–41	2 Q	—N/a	Independent Olympic Athletes; L 32–42	2nd place, silver medalist(s)
Iran	Women	Japan; W 46–35	Vietnam; W 65–30	Thailand; W 60–26	—N/a		1 Q	South Korea; W 55–29	Independent Olympic Athletes; L 31–54	2nd place, silver medalist(s)
Roster – Men: Kianoush Naderian; Meraj Sheikh; Abolfazl Maghsoudloo; Esmaeil Maghsoudloo; Fazel Atrachali; Navid Nazari; Farhad Rahimi; Coach: Abdolhamid Maghsoudloo Roster – Women: Samira Shabani; Salimeh Abdollahbakhsh; Marzieh Eshghi; Farideh Zarifdoust; Sedigheh Jafari; Sahar Ilat; Hengameh Bourghani; Coach: Azam Maghsoudloo

=== Kurash ===
Athlete	Event	Round of 16	Quarterfinal	Semifinal	Final	Rank
Elias Aliakbari	Men's 73 kg	Al-Jarrah (YEM); W 111–000	Partap (AOI); W 101–000	Boboev (UZB); W 002–001	Temirow (TKM); W 102–001	1st place, gold medalist(s)
Hojjat Rahnama	Men's 90 kg	—N/a	Ýalkapow (TKM); L 001–100	Did not advance		5
Saeid Khosravinejad	Men's +90 kg	—N/a	Bye	Saeki (JPN); L 001–002	Did not advance	3rd place, bronze medalist(s)
Somayyeh Heidari	Women's 57 kg	—N/a	Bye	Seo (KOR); W 010–001	Atajonova (UZB); L 000–001	2nd place, silver medalist(s)
Akram Khani	Women's 63 kg	Pawar (AOI); W 102–000	Su (TPE); L 010–103	Did not advance		5

=== Muaythai ===
Athlete	Event	Round of 16	Quarterfinal	Semifinal	Final	Rank
Vahid Shahbazi	Men's 63.5 kg	Bye	Salim (IRQ); W 5–0	Chin (HKG); W RSCO	Souliyavong (LAO); W 4–1	1st place, gold medalist(s)
Masoud Minaei	Men's 67 kg	Zawawi (MAS); W 5–0	Gregorio (PHI); W 5–0	Maung (MYA); W 5–0	Pansuwan (THA); L 0–5	2nd place, silver medalist(s)
Issa Alamdar	Men's 71 kg	—N/a	Bye	Matli (THA); L 0–5	Did not advance	3rd place, bronze medalist(s)
Mastaneh Seifabadi	Women's 51 kg	—N/a	Bùi (VIE); L RSCB	Did not advance		DOP
Somayyeh Barzegari	Women's 54 kg	Yang (CHN); L 0–5	Did not advance			9

=== Short course swimming ===
Athlete	Event	Heats		Final	
Athlete	Event	Time	Rank	Time	Rank
Mohammad Bidarian	Men's 50 m freestyle	23.18	13	Did not advance	
Arsham Mirzaei	Men's 50 m freestyle	23.47	16	Did not advance	
Mohammad Bidarian	Men's 100 m freestyle	50.33	8 Q	50.87	8
Arsham Mirzaei	Men's 100 m freestyle	51.96	19	Did not advance	
Mohammad Bidarian	Men's 200 m freestyle	2:07.49	26	Did not advance	
Arsham Mirzaei	Men's 200 m freestyle	2:08.70	27	Did not advance	
Jamal Chavoshifar	Men's 50 m backstroke	25.93	10	Did not advance	
Jamal Chavoshifar	Men's 100 m backstroke	56.15	7 Q	56.06	7
Amir Mohammad Shojaeifar	Men's 50 m breaststroke	28.69	10	Did not advance	
Amir Mohammad Shojaeifar	Men's 100 m breaststroke	1:02.87	16	Did not advance	
Afshin Asgari	Men's 50 m butterfly	DSQ	—	Did not advance	
Ahmad Reza Jalali	Men's 50 m butterfly	25.74	16	Did not advance	
Afshin Asgari	Men's 100 m butterfly	58.07	20	Did not advance	
Ahmad Reza Jalali	Men's 100 m butterfly	55.88	16	Did not advance	
Ahmad Reza Jalali	Men's 100 m individual medley	57.58	14	Did not advance	
Amir Mohammad Shojaeifar	Men's 100 m individual medley	58.33	20	Did not advance	
Ahmad Reza Jalali	Men's 200 m individual medley	2:05.36	14	Did not advance	
Mohammad Bidarian; Arsham Mirzaei; Jamal Chavoshifar; Ahmad Reza Jalali	Men's 4 × 50 m freestyle relay	1:33.02	8 Q	1:31.29	5
Mohammad Bidarian; Ahmad Reza Jalali; Jamal Chavoshifar; Arsham Mirzaei	Men's 4 × 100 m freestyle relay	3:25.93	8 Q	3:23.55	6
Jamal Chavoshifar; Amir Mohammad Shojaeifar; Ahmad Reza Jalali; Arsham Mirzaei	Men's 4 × 50 m medley relay	1:43.01	9	Did not advance	
Jamal Chavoshifar; Amir Mohammad Shojaeifar; Ahmad Reza Jalali; Mohammad Bidarian	Men's 4 × 100 m medley relay	3:48.01	9	Did not advance	
