= Antoine Kassis =

Lebanese chess player (born 1972)

Personal information
- Born: September 10, 1972 (age 53)

Chess career
- Country: Lebanon
- Title: FIDE Master (2013)
- Peak rating: 2249 (July 2009)

Antoine Kassis is a Lebanese chess player. He was awarded the title of FIDE Master in 2013.

== Chess career ==
Kassis has represented Lebanon in a number of Chess Olympiads, including:

- 1994, where he scored 3½/9 on board four.
- 1996, scoring 4½/9 on first reserve.
- 1998, scoring 6½/11 on first reserve.
- 2002, scoring 5/10 on first reserve.
- 2004, scoring 4/9 on board four.
- 2006, scoring 5/9 on board three.
- 2008, scoring 5½/9 on board three
- 2010, scoring 4/10 on board four.
- 2012, scoring 6/10 on board four.
- 2014, scoring 5½/9 on board two
- 2016, scoring 3/9 on board three.
- 2018, scoring 3½/8 on board four.

He won the Lebanese Chess Championship in 1995, 2018 and 2019.

He qualified to play in the Chess World Cup 2021, where he was defeated 2-0 by Yuri Kuzubov in the first round.
