= Kurash at the 2013 Asian Indoor and Martial Arts Games =

- Venue: Sangnoksu Gymnasium
- Dates: 4–6 July 2013

Kurash for the 2013 Asian Indoor and Martial Arts Games was held at the Ansan Sangnoksu Gymnasium. It took place from 4 to 6 July 2013. In the past, this sport was a demonstration one for Macau 2007. Like the sport of indoor kabaddi, Kurash was contested in both Hanoi (Asian Indoor Games) and Bangkok (Asian Martial Arts Games) separately in 2009 for medals.

== Medalists ==
=== Men ===
| Event | Gold | Silver | Bronze |
|---|---|---|---|
| −66 kg | Kota Eto; Japan | Suhrob Hudoyberdiev; Uzbekistan | Dauren Damen; Kazakhstan |
| −66 kg | Kota Eto; Japan | Suhrob Hudoyberdiev; Uzbekistan | Noureddin Hamada; Syria |
| −73 kg | Elias Aliakbari; Iran | Muhammet Temirow; Turkmenistan | Zhanibek Nazarov; Kazakhstan |
| −73 kg | Elias Aliakbari; Iran | Muhammet Temirow; Turkmenistan | Giyosjon Boboev; Uzbekistan |
| −81 kg | Sanjar Tukhtashov; Uzbekistan | Serdar Jummyýew; Turkmenistan | Kim Chan-kyu; South Korea |
| −81 kg | Sanjar Tukhtashov; Uzbekistan | Serdar Jummyýew; Turkmenistan | Ganbaataryn Gonchigsumlaa; Mongolia |
| −90 kg | Nuraly Ýalkapow; Turkmenistan | Saidzhalol Saidov; Tajikistan | Ali Abdul-Hussein; Iraq |
| −90 kg | Nuraly Ýalkapow; Turkmenistan | Saidzhalol Saidov; Tajikistan | Daichi Kusano; Japan |
| +90 kg | Parviz Sobirov; Tajikistan | Yuma Saeki; Japan | Talgat Kozhabayev; Kazakhstan |
| +90 kg | Parviz Sobirov; Tajikistan | Yuma Saeki; Japan | Saeid Khosravinejad; Iran |

=== Women ===
| Event | Gold | Silver | Bronze |
|---|---|---|---|
| −52 kg | Văn Ngọc Tú; Vietnam | Aýna Jumakulyýewa; Turkmenistan | Ke Ya-hsin; Chinese Taipei |
| −52 kg | Văn Ngọc Tú; Vietnam | Aýna Jumakulyýewa; Turkmenistan | Poorva Mathew; Independent Olympic Athletes |
| −57 kg | Gulyar Atajonova; Uzbekistan | Somayyeh Heidari; Iran | Petlada Nuinkaew; Thailand |
| −57 kg | Gulyar Atajonova; Uzbekistan | Somayyeh Heidari; Iran | Seo Bo-young; South Korea |
| −63 kg | Su Shih-lin; Chinese Taipei | Nasiba Surkiýewa; Turkmenistan | Bùi Thị Hòa; Vietnam |
| −63 kg | Su Shih-lin; Chinese Taipei | Nasiba Surkiýewa; Turkmenistan | Caren Chammas; Lebanon |

== Medal table ==
| Rank | Nation | Gold | Silver | Bronze | Total |
|---|---|---|---|---|---|
| 1 | Uzbekistan (UZB) | 2 | 1 | 1 | 4 |
| 2 | Turkmenistan (TKM) | 1 | 4 | 0 | 5 |
| 3 | Iran (IRI) | 1 | 1 | 1 | 3 |
| 3 | Japan (JPN) | 1 | 1 | 1 | 3 |
| 5 | Tajikistan (TJK) | 1 | 1 | 0 | 2 |
| 6 | Chinese Taipei (TPE) | 1 | 0 | 1 | 2 |
| 6 | Vietnam (VIE) | 1 | 0 | 1 | 2 |
| 8 | Kazakhstan (KAZ) | 0 | 0 | 3 | 3 |
| 9 | South Korea (KOR) | 0 | 0 | 2 | 2 |
| 10 | Independent Olympic Athletes (AOI) | 0 | 0 | 1 | 1 |
| 10 | Iraq (IRQ) | 0 | 0 | 1 | 1 |
| 10 | Lebanon (LIB) | 0 | 0 | 1 | 1 |
| 10 | Mongolia (MGL) | 0 | 0 | 1 | 1 |
| 10 | Syria (SYR) | 0 | 0 | 1 | 1 |
| 10 | Thailand (THA) | 0 | 0 | 1 | 1 |
| Totals (15 entries) | | 8 | 8 | 16 | 32 |

== Results ==
=== Men ===
==== 66 kg ====
4 July

Round of 16
Hussein Mohammed (IRQ) | 013
Chan Hao-cheng (TPE) | 010

Quarterfinals
Hussein Mohammed (IRQ) | 000
Dauren Damen (KAZ) | 111
Kota Eto (JPN) | 101
Hồ Ngân Giang (VIE) | 000
Suhrob Hudoyberdiev (UZB) | 100
Songwutt Kaewpinit (THA) | 000
Noureddin Hamada (SYR) | 010
Nader Dekhn (YEM) | 001

Semifinals
Dauren Damen (KAZ) | 000
Kota Eto (JPN) | 102
Suhrob Hudoyberdiev (UZB) | 100
Noureddin Hamada (SYR) | 001

Final
Kota Eto (JPN) | 014
Suhrob Hudoyberdiev (UZB) | 001

==== 73 kg ====
4 July

Round of 16
Zhanibek Nazarov (KAZ) | 103
Mohamad Kasem (SYR) | 001
Kanjanaphat Janya (THA) | 001
Trần Thương (VIE) | 101
Giyosjon Boboev (UZB) | 121
Kao Chia-chi (TPE) | 000
Elias Aliakbari (IRI) | 111
Hussein Al-Jarrah (YEM) | 000

Quarterfinals
Zhanibek Nazarov (KAZ) | 110
Jeong Jun-yeong (KOR) | 000
Trần Thương (VIE) | 000
Muhammet Temirow (TKM) | 100
Giyosjon Boboev (UZB) | 101
Jargalsaikhany Davaadagva (MGL) | 000
Elias Aliakbari (IRI) | 101
Bhanu Partap (AOI) | 000

Semifinals
Zhanibek Nazarov (KAZ) | 001
Muhammet Temirow (TKM) | 110
Giyosjon Boboev (UZB) | 001
Elias Aliakbari (IRI) | 002

Final
Muhammet Temirow (TKM) | 001
Elias Aliakbari (IRI) | 102

==== 81 kg ====
5 July

Round of 16
Pharuehatphasathonbodee Suwannaphueng (THA) | 000
Sanjar Tukhtashov (UZB) | 101
Serdar Jummyýew (TKM) | 110
Murtadha Kamal (IRQ) | 000

Quarterfinals
Sanjar Tukhtashov (UZB) | 110
Methkal Al-Jaramani (SYR) | 001
Wu Chia-luan (TPE) | 002
Kim Chan-kyu (KOR) | 100
Serdar Jummyýew (TKM) | 002
Tô Hải Long (VIE) | 001
Manish Kumar (AOI) | 010
Ganbaataryn Gonchigsumlaa (MGL) | 011

Semifinals
Sanjar Tukhtashov (UZB) | 122
Kim Chan-kyu (KOR) | 000
Serdar Jummyýew (TKM) | 100
Ganbaataryn Gonchigsumlaa (MGL) | 000

Final
Sanjar Tukhtashov (UZB) | 111
Serdar Jummyýew (TKM) | 000

==== 90 kg ====
5 July

| Quarterfinals | | Semifinals | | Final |
| Ali Abdul-Hussein (IRQ) | 110 |
| Pierre Bou Abboud (LIB) | 010 | Ali Abdul-Hussein (IRQ) | 000 |
| Nuraly Ýalkapow (TKM) | 100 | Nuraly Ýalkapow (TKM) | 120 |
| Hojjat Rahnama (IRI) | 001 | | | Nuraly Ýalkapow (TKM) | 003 |
| Kim Dae-geon (KOR) | 001 | | | Saidzhalol Saidov (TJK) | 001 |
| Saidzhalol Saidov (TJK) | 102 | Saidzhalol Saidov (TJK) | 101 |
| | | Daichi Kusano (JPN) | 000 |

==== +90 kg ====
6 July

Quarterfinals
Sachin Mann (AOI) | 000
Parviz Sobirov (TJK) | 101

Semifinals
Parviz Sobirov (TJK) | 100
Talgat Kozhabayev (KAZ) | 001
Yuma Saeki (JPN) | 002
Saeid Khosravinejad (IRI) | 001

Final
Parviz Sobirov (TJK) | 101
Yuma Saeki (JPN) | 001

=== Women ===
==== 52 kg ====
4 July

Quarterfinals
Chanoknan Inklad (THA) | 001
Aýna Jumakulyýewa (TKM) | 010

Semifinals
Aýna Jumakulyýewa (TKM) | 101
Ke Ya-hsin (TPE) | 000
Văn Ngọc Tú (VIE) | 102
Poorva Mathew (AOI) | 000

Final
Aýna Jumakulyýewa (TKM) | 001
Văn Ngọc Tú (VIE) | 100

==== 57 kg ====
5 July

Quarterfinals
Anzhelika Guz (KAZ) | 000
Petlada Nuinkaew (THA) | 101

Semifinals
Petlada Nuinkaew (THA) | 001
Gulyar Atajonova (UZB) | 011
Somayyeh Heidari (IRI) | 010
Seo Bo-young (KOR) | 001

Final
Gulyar Atajonova (UZB) | 001
Somayyeh Heidari (IRI) | 000

==== 63 kg ====
6 July

Round of 16
Gitanjali Pawar (AOI) | 000
Akram Khani (IRI) | 102

Quarterfinals
Akram Khani (IRI) | 010
Su Shih-lin (TPE) | 103
Anzhelika Mukhamedyanova (KAZ) | 000
Bùi Thị Hòa (VIE) | 100
Caren Chammas (LIB) | 010
Choi Su-young (KOR) | 002
Kundiz Baimanova (UZB) | 000
Nasiba Surkiýewa (TKM) | 102

Semifinals
Su Shih-lin (TPE) | 012
Bùi Thị Hòa (VIE) | 010
Caren Chammas (LIB) | 000
Nasiba Surkiýewa (TKM) | 100

Final
Su Shih-lin (TPE) | 120
Nasiba Surkiýewa (TKM) | 000
