= Sayuni Gihansa Jayaweera =

Sri Lankan chess player (born 2002)

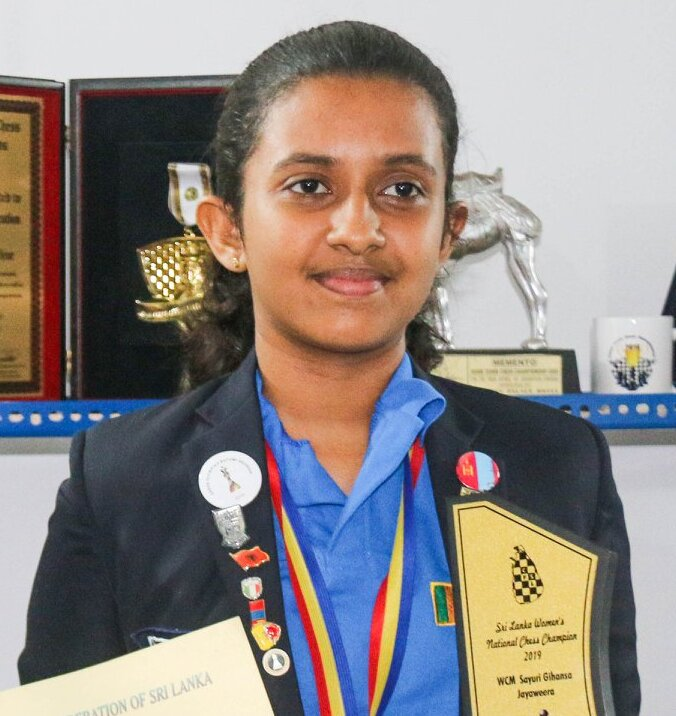

Personal information
- Born: 2002 (age 23–24) Ambalangoda, Sri Lanka

Chess career
- Country: Sri Lanka
- Title: Woman Candidate Master (2014)
- Peak rating: 1852 (September 2025)

Sayuni Gihansa Jayaweera is a Sri Lankan chess player.

== Chess career ==
She won the Sri Lankan Women's Chess Championship in 2017 and 2019.

In May 2020, she won the Asian Girls Online Chess Championship.

== Personal life ==
She attended Dharmasoka College.
