= Romesh Weerawardane =

Sri Lankan chess player

Personal information
- Born: 22 October 1979 (age 46)

Chess career
- Country: Sri Lanka
- Title: International Master (2013)
- Peak rating: 2203 (July 2004)

Romesh Weerawardane (born 22 October 1979) is a Sri Lankan chess player. Weerawardane was the first Sri Lankan to be an International Master. Weerawardane competed in two Chess Olympiads in 2010 and 2016, scoring 2/6 and 2.5/10 respectively. He serves as a FIDE Instructor.

Romesh Weerawardane has also represented the national team in the Asian Indoor and Martial Arts Games in 2013 and 2017. He won the Kalutara International Chess Festival tournament in 2014 and the Sri Lanka Grand Prix in 2016. He was the runner-up to Dulan Edirisinghe in the 2015 Sri Lankan Chess Championship and to Rajeendra Kalugampitiya the following year.

== See also ==
- Chess at the 2013 Asian Indoor and Martial Arts Games
- Chess at the 2017 Asian Indoor and Martial Arts Games
