= Cue sports at the 2013 Asian Indoor and Martial Arts Games =

- Venue: Songdo Convensia
- Dates: 29 June – 6 July 2013

Cue sports for the 2013 Asian Indoor and Martial Arts Games was held at the Songdo Convensia in Incheon, South Korea. It took place from 29 June to 6 July 2013. This was the third time this sport was part of the Games, after Macau 2007 and Hanoi 2009.

== Medalists ==
=== Men ===
Event	Gold	Silver	Bronze
One-cushion singles	Hwang Durk-hee; South Korea	Ngô Đình Nại; Vietnam	Yoichiro Mori; Japan
One-cushion singles	Hwang Durk-hee; South Korea	Ngô Đình Nại; Vietnam	Mã Minh Cẩm; Vietnam
Three-cushion singles	Ryuji Umeda; Japan	Nguyễn Quốc Nguyện; Vietnam	Mã Xuân Cường; Vietnam
Three-cushion singles	Ryuji Umeda; Japan	Nguyễn Quốc Nguyện; Vietnam	O Takeshima; Japan
English billiards singles	Praprut Chaithanasakun; Thailand	Nguyễn Thanh Bình; Vietnam	Aung Htay; Myanmar
English billiards singles	Praprut Chaithanasakun; Thailand	Nguyễn Thanh Bình; Vietnam	Peter Gilchrist; Singapore
Nine-ball singles	Ko Pin-yi; Chinese Taipei	Abdullah Al-Yousef; Kuwait	Li Hewen; China
Nine-ball singles	Ko Pin-yi; Chinese Taipei	Abdullah Al-Yousef; Kuwait	Kwok Chi Ho; Hong Kong
Snooker singles	Cao Yupeng; China	Ding Junhui; China	Aditya Mehta; Independent Olympic Athletes
Snooker singles	Cao Yupeng; China	Ding Junhui; China	Saleh Mohammad; Afghanistan
Snooker team	China; Ding Junhui; Liang Wenbo; Tian Pengfei	Independent Olympic Athletes; Kamal Chawla; Brijesh Damani; Aditya Mehta	Chinese Taipei; Lin Shu-hung; Lu Yu-hsu; Wu Yu-lun
Snooker team	China; Ding Junhui; Liang Wenbo; Tian Pengfei	Independent Olympic Athletes; Kamal Chawla; Brijesh Damani; Aditya Mehta	Syria; Omar Al-Kojah; Karam Fatima
Six-red snooker singles	Xiao Guodong; China	Amir Sarkhosh; Iran	Ali Al-Obaidly; Qatar
Six-red snooker singles	Xiao Guodong; China	Amir Sarkhosh; Iran	Omar Al-Kojah; Syria

=== Women ===
Event	Gold	Silver	Bronze
Nine-ball singles	Cha Yu-ram; South Korea	Tan Ho-yun; Chinese Taipei	Kim Ga-young; South Korea
Nine-ball singles	Cha Yu-ram; South Korea	Tan Ho-yun; Chinese Taipei	Chou Chieh-yu; Chinese Taipei
Ten-ball singles	Cha Yu-ram; South Korea	Chihiro Kawahara; Japan	Chou Chieh-yu; Chinese Taipei
Ten-ball singles	Cha Yu-ram; South Korea	Chihiro Kawahara; Japan	Rubilen Amit; Philippines
Six-red snooker singles	Amornrat Uamduang; Thailand	Ng On Yee; Hong Kong	Chitra Magimairaj; Independent Olympic Athletes
Six-red snooker singles	Amornrat Uamduang; Thailand	Ng On Yee; Hong Kong	Jaique Ip; Hong Kong

== Medal table ==
Rank	Nation	Gold	Silver	Bronze	Total
1	China (CHN)	3	1	1	5
2	South Korea (KOR)	3	0	1	4
3	Thailand (THA)	2	0	0	2
4	Chinese Taipei (TPE)	1	1	3	5
5	Japan (JPN)	1	1	2	4
6	Vietnam (VIE)	0	3	2	5
7	Hong Kong (HKG)	0	1	2	3
7	Independent Olympic Athletes (AOI)	0	1	2	3
9	Iran (IRI)	0	1	0	1
9	Kuwait (KUW)	0	1	0	1
11	Syria (SYR)	0	0	2	2
12	Afghanistan (AFG)	0	0	1	1
12	Myanmar (MYA)	0	0	1	1
12	Philippines (PHI)	0	0	1	1
12	Qatar (QAT)	0	0	1	1
12	Singapore (SIN)	0	0	1	1
Totals (16 entries)		10	10	20	40

== Results ==
=== Men ===
==== One-cushion singles ====
Round of 16; 29–30 June
Rudy Hasan (INA)	96
Alimaagiin Baatarkhüü (MGL)	30
Jean Jarjoura (LIB)	66
Thawat Sujaritthurakarn (THA)	32
Yoichiro Mori (JPN)	100
Kim Kyung-roul (KOR)	43
Francisco dela Cruz (PHI)	83
Suriya Suwannasingh (THA)	34
Mã Minh Cẩm (VIE)	100
Batbayaryn Dorjsüren (MGL)	22

Quarterfinals; 30 June
Ngô Đình Nại (VIE)	100
Rudy Hasan (INA)	67
Jean Jarjoura (LIB)	72
Yoichiro Mori (JPN)	100
Hwang Durk-hee (KOR)	100
Francisco dela Cruz (PHI)	73
Mã Minh Cẩm (VIE)	100
Tadashi Machida (JPN)	55

Semifinals; 1 July
Ngô Đình Nại (VIE)	100
Yoichiro Mori (JPN)	28
Hwang Durk-hee (KOR)	100
Mã Minh Cẩm (VIE)	51

Gold medal match 1 July
Ngô Đình Nại (VIE)	97
Hwang Durk-hee (KOR)	100

==== Three-cushion singles ====
Round of 16; 2–3 July
Mã Xuân Cường (VIE)	40
Thawat Sujaritthurakarn (THA)	8
Rudy Hasan (INA)	38
Alimaagiin Baatarkhüü (MGL)	26
Francisco dela Cruz (PHI)	25
Ryuji Umeda (JPN)	40
O Takeshima (JPN)	39
Batbayaryn Dorjsüren (MGL)	34
Antoine Gholam (LIB)	40
Suriya Suwannasingh (THA)	20

Quarterfinals; 3 July
Cho Jae-ho (KOR)	40
Mã Xuân Cường (VIE)	40
Rudy Hasan (INA)	29
Ryuji Umeda (JPN)	40
Kim Kyung-roul (KOR)	37
O Takeshima (JPN)	40
Antoine Gholam (LIB)	20
Nguyễn Quốc Nguyện (VIE)	40

Semifinals; 4 July
Mã Xuân Cường (VIE)	32
Ryuji Umeda (JPN)	40
O Takeshima (JPN)	33
Nguyễn Quốc Nguyện (VIE)	40

Gold medal match 4 July
Ryuji Umeda (JPN)	40
Nguyễn Quốc Nguyện (VIE)	39

==== English billiards singles ====
Round of 32 – 4 July
Soheil Vahedi (IRI)	3–0	Mohammed Al-Jifri (KSA)
Mohanna Al-Obaidly (QAT)	WO	Kanybek Sagynbaev (KGZ)
Hwang Chul-ho (KOR)	2–3	Hekta Ahmad (INA)
Faisal Al-Balushi (OMA)	WO	Baldandorjiin Batsükh (MGL)
Thawat Sujaritthurakarn (THA)	3–1	Nay Thway Oo (MYA)
Kubanychbek Sagyndykov (KGZ)	3–1	Baek Min-hu (KOR)
Hamood Al-Harthy (OMA)	WO	Amir Sarkhosh (IRI)

Round of 16; 4 July
Praprut Chaithanasakun (THA)	3
Sourav Kothari (AOI)	0
Soheil Vahedi (IRI)	2
Nguyễn Thanh Long (VIE)	3
Bye
Hekta Ahmad (INA)
Baldandorjiin Batsükh (MGL)	0
Aung Htay (MYA)	3
Balachandra Bhaskar (AOI)	1
Thawat Sujaritthurakarn (THA)	3
Bye
Nguyễn Thanh Bình (VIE)
Jaka Kurniawan (INA)	3
Kubanychbek Sagyndykov (KGZ)	1
Amir Sarkhosh (IRI)	0
Peter Gilchrist (SIN)	3

Quarterfinals; 5 July
Praprut Chaithanasakun (THA)	3
Nguyễn Thanh Long (VIE)	0
Hekta Ahmad (INA)	0
Aung Htay (MYA)	3
Thawat Sujaritthurakarn (THA)	1
Nguyễn Thanh Bình (VIE)	3
Jaka Kurniawan (INA)	2
Peter Gilchrist (SIN)	3

Semifinals; 5 July
Praprut Chaithanasakun (THA)	3
Aung Htay (MYA)	2
Nguyễn Thanh Bình (VIE)	3
Peter Gilchrist (SIN)	2

Gold medal match 5 July
Praprut Chaithanasakun (THA)	3
Nguyễn Thanh Bình (VIE)	1

==== Nine-ball singles ====
Round of 64 – 29–30 June
Radwan Sorouji (KSA)	9–7	Bader Al-Awadhi (KUW)
Eurico dos Santos (MAC)	4–9	Ali Fayaz (MDV)
Ryu Seung-woo (KOR)	9–4	Lagnaidorjiin Delgerdalai (MGL)
Aloysius Yapp (SIN)	9–3	Fadi Aburdaha (PLE)
Hiroyuki Mizushita (JPN)	9–7	Ali Mohammed Abbas (BRN)
Nguyễn Anh Tuấn (VIE)	6–9	Kobkit Palajin (THA)
Alok Kumar (AOI)	9–5	Mazen Berjaoui (LIB)
Muhammad Zulfikri (INA)	9–6	Bashar Hussein (QAT)
Salaheldeen Hussein (UAE)	5–9	Đỗ Thế Kiên (VIE)
Mohannad Al-Ghumayz (KSA)	7–9	Divya Sharma (AOI)
Batyr Aşyrow (TKM)	1–9	Irsal Nasution (INA)
Hashmatullah Nezami (AFG)	1–9	Toru Kuribayashi (JPN)
Ibrahim Amir (MAS)	4–9	Han Haoxiang (CHN)
Mohamad Ali Berjaoui (LIB)	4–9	Sayeem Hossain (BAN)
Dorjjantsangiin Damdinjamts (MGL)	9–5	Faisal Al-Balushi (OMA)
Mohammad Asfari (SYR)	4–9	Nitiwat Kanjanasri (THA)
Mohammed Al-Binali (QAT)	9–0	Mohamed Shareef (MDV)

Round of 32 – 30 June
Li Hewen (CHN)	9–1	Radwan Sorouji (KSA)
Ali Fayaz (MDV)	1–9	Mohammad Ali Pordel (IRI)
Mohammed Al-Hosani (UAE)	9–8	Ryu Seung-woo (KOR)
Ahmad Taufiq Murni (BRU)	9–6	Aloysius Yapp (SIN)
Hamood Al-Harthy (OMA)	0–9	Hiroyuki Mizushita (JPN)
Kobkit Palajin (THA)	9–1	Begenç Aýdogdyýew (TKM)
Alok Kumar (AOI)	7–9	Alan Tan (MAS)
Muhammad Zulfikri (INA)	5–9	Ko Pin-yi (TPE)
Fu Che-wei (TPE)	8–9	Đỗ Thế Kiên (VIE)
Divya Sharma (AOI)	4–9	Kwok Chi Ho (HKG)
Jeong Young-hwa (KOR)	3–9	Irsal Nasution (INA)
Toru Kuribayashi (JPN)	3–9	Han Haoxiang (CHN)
Abdullah Al-Yousef (KUW)	9–5	Sayeem Hossain (BAN)
Abdulla Isa (BRN)	1–9	Dorjjantsangiin Damdinjamts (MGL)
Takhti Zarekani (IRI)	9–4	Nitiwat Kanjanasri (THA)
Mohammed Al-Binali (QAT)	4–9	Toh Lian Han (SIN)

Round of 16; 1 July
Li Hewen (CHN)	9
Mohammad Ali Pordel (IRI)	6
Mohammed Al-Hosani (UAE)	6
Ahmad Taufiq Murni (BRU)	9
Hiroyuki Mizushita (JPN)	6
Kobkit Palajin (THA)	9
Alan Tan (MAS)	4
Ko Pin-yi (TPE)	9
Đỗ Thế Kiên (VIE)	6
Kwok Chi Ho (HKG)	9
Irsal Nasution (INA)	9
Han Haoxiang (CHN)	5
Abdullah Al-Yousef (KUW)	9
Dorjjantsangiin Damdinjamts (MGL)	5
Takhti Zarekani (IRI)	7
Toh Lian Han (SIN)	9

Quarterfinals; 1 July
Li Hewen (CHN)	9
Ahmad Taufiq Murni (BRU)	7
Kobkit Palajin (THA)	6
Ko Pin-yi (TPE)	9
Kwok Chi Ho (HKG)	9
Irsal Nasution (INA)	8
Abdullah Al-Yousef (KUW)	9
Toh Lian Han (SIN)	8

Semifinals; 2 July
Li Hewen (CHN)	5
Ko Pin-yi (TPE)	9
Kwok Chi Ho (HKG)	8
Abdullah Al-Yousef (KUW)	9

Gold medal match 2 July
Ko Pin-yi (TPE)	9
Abdullah Al-Yousef (KUW)	4

==== Snooker singles ====
Round of 64 – 3 July
Ahmed Saif (QAT)	1–4	Fung Kwok Wai (HKG)
Thor Chuan Leong (MAS)	4–1	Enkhbaataryn Enkhjargal (MGL)
Mohammad Rais Senzahi (AFG)	4–3	Mubarak Al-Owais (KUW)
Takao Kurimoto (JPN)	4–2	Yzatbek Ratbekov (KGZ)
Yoni Rachmanto (INA)	4–2	Ahmed Al-Khusaibi (OMA)
Wu Yu-lun (TPE)	4–0	Han Sang-hee (KOR)
Michael Angelo Mengorio (PHI)	3–4	Mohammed Al-Jokar (UAE)
Kiều Thiên Khôi (VIE)	4–0	Kamaladdin Babaýew (TKM)
Cao Yupeng (CHN)	4–3	Ang Boon Chin (SIN)
Hussain Al-Awadhi (KUW)	2–4	Omar Al-Ajlani (KSA)
Chau Hon Man (HKG)	4–1	Vong Tat Keong (MAC)
Hossein Vafaei (IRI)	4–0	Kubanychbek Sagyndykov (KGZ)
Omar Al-Busaidi (OMA)	4–1	Baýramgeldi Çakanow (TKM)
Karam Fatima (SYR)	1–4	Kamal Chawla (AOI)
Shuji Hase (JPN)	2–4	Lin Shu-hung (TPE)

Round of 32 – 3–4 July
Ding Junhui (CHN)	4–0	Fung Kwok Wai (HKG)
Thor Chuan Leong (MAS)	4–0	Ahmed Aseeri (KSA)
Marvin Lim (SIN)	3–4	Mohammad Rais Senzahi (AFG)
Ehsan Heidarinejad (IRI)	4–1	Takao Kurimoto (JPN)
Fan Hio Fong (MAC)	0–4	Yoni Rachmanto (INA)
Wu Yu-lun (TPE)	4–3	Omar Al-Kojah (SYR)
Mohammed Al-Jokar (UAE)	4–2	Noppon Saengkham (THA)
Kiều Thiên Khôi (VIE)	0–4	Aditya Mehta (AOI)
Mohammed Shehab (UAE)	1–4	Cao Yupeng (CHN)
Omar Al-Ajlani (KSA)	2–4	Batdelgeriin Sergelen (MGL)
Rodolfo Lordan (PHI)	2–4	Chau Hon Man (HKG)
Reza Hassan (MAS)	3–4	Hossein Vafaei (IRI)
Supoj Saenla (THA)	4–2	Omar Al-Busaidi (OMA)
Mohsen Bukshaisha (QAT)	1–4	Kamal Chawla (AOI)
Phạm Hoài Nguyên (VIE)	3–4	Lee Gun-jae (KOR)
Lin Shu-hung (TPE)	2–4	Saleh Mohammad (AFG)

Round of 16; 5 July
Ding Junhui (CHN)	4
Thor Chuan Leong (MAS)	2
Mohammad Rais Senzahi (AFG)	1
Ehsan Heidarinejad (IRI)	4
Yoni Rachmanto (INA)	2
Wu Yu-lun (TPE)	4
Mohammed Al-Jokar (UAE)	1
Aditya Mehta (AOI)	4
Cao Yupeng (CHN)	4
Batdelgeriin Sergelen (MGL)	0
Chau Hon Man (HKG)	2
Hossein Vafaei (IRI)	4
Supoj Saenla (THA)	1
Kamal Chawla (AOI)	4
Lee Gun-jae (KOR)	1
Saleh Mohammad (AFG)	4

Quarterfinals; 5 July
Ding Junhui (CHN)	4
Ehsan Heidarinejad (IRI)	1
Wu Yu-lun (TPE)	0
Aditya Mehta (AOI)	4
Cao Yupeng (CHN)	4
Hossein Vafaei (IRI)	0
Kamal Chawla (AOI)	2
Saleh Mohammad (AFG)	4

Semifinals; 6 July
Ding Junhui (CHN)	4
Aditya Mehta (AOI)	2
Cao Yupeng (CHN)	4
Saleh Mohammad (AFG)	1

Gold medal match 6 July
Ding Junhui (CHN)	2
Cao Yupeng (CHN)	4

==== Snooker team ====
Round of 32 – 1 July
South Korea	3–2	Palestine
Iran	3–0	Saudi Arabia
Chinese Taipei	3–1	Kyrgyzstan
Malaysia	3–1	Kuwait
Syria	3–0	Philippines
Afghanistan	3–1	Vietnam
Indonesia	1–3	Macau
Thailand	3–0	Mongolia

Round of 16; 1–2 July
Independent Olympic Athletes	3
South Korea	2
Iran	3
Japan	0
Hong Kong	0
Chinese Taipei	3
Malaysia	3
Singapore	1
United Arab Emirates	2
Syria	3
Afghanistan	3
Oman	0
China	3
Macau	0
Thailand	3
Qatar	2

Quarterfinals; 2 July
Independent Olympic Athletes	3
Iran	2
Chinese Taipei	3
Malaysia	0
Syria	3
Afghanistan	2
China	3
Thailand	2

Semifinals; 2 July
Independent Olympic Athletes	3
Chinese Taipei	1
Syria	1
China	3

Gold medal match 2 July
Independent Olympic Athletes	2
China	3

==== Six-red snooker singles ====
Round of 64 – 29–30 June
Mohammed Shehab (UAE)	5–1	Mohammad Rais Senzahi (AFG)
Karam Fatima (SYR)	5–4	Fung Kwok Wai (HKG)
Lin Shu-hung (TPE)	5–3	Ahmed Al-Khusaibi (OMA)
Ratchayothin Yotharuck (THA)	5–1	Tüvshinjargalyn Khash-Ochir (MGL)
Hiroshi Matsumura (JPN)	5–0	Yousef Al-Wadi (KSA)
Yzatbek Ratbekov (KGZ)	WO	Hossein Vafaei (IRI)
Vong Tat Keong (MAC)	4–5	Kiều Thiên Khôi (VIE)
Ang Boon Chin (SIN)	5–2	Hussain Al-Awadhi (KUW)
Andy Lee (HKG)	2–5	Mohammed Al-Jokar (UAE)
Sundeep Gulati (AOI)	WO	Mazen Berjaoui (LIB)
Michael Angelo Mengorio (PHI)	5–4	Lee Gun-jae (KOR)
Omar Al-Kojah (SYR)	5–4	Boonyarit Kaettikun (THA)
Mohsen Bukshaisha (QAT)	5–1	Jalal Al-Lawati (OMA)
Saleh Mohammad (AFG)	5–0	Fan Hio Fong (MAC)
Phạm Hoài Nguyên (VIE)	2–5	Enkhbaataryn Enkhjargal (MGL)

Round of 32 – 30 June
Xiao Guodong (CHN)	5–0	Mohammed Shehab (UAE)
Karam Fatima (SYR)	2–5	Reza Hassan (MAS)
Rodolfo Lordan (PHI)	1–5	Lin Shu-hung (TPE)
Mohamad Ali Berjaoui (LIB)	WO	Ratchayothin Yotharuck (THA)
Mamoun Mahameed (PLE)	5–2	Hiroshi Matsumura (JPN)
Hossein Vafaei (IRI)	5–0	Ham Won-sik (KOR)
Kiều Thiên Khôi (VIE)	1–5	Ali Al-Obaidly (QAT)
Ang Boon Chin (SIN)	3–5	Shahbaz Adil Khan (AOI)
Wu Yu-lun (TPE)	3–5	Mohammed Al-Jokar (UAE)
Sundeep Gulati (AOI)	5–2	Kubanychbek Sagyndykov (KGZ)
Yoni Rachmanto (INA)	5–1	Michael Angelo Mengorio (PHI)
Thor Chuan Leong (MAS)	4–5	Omar Al-Kojah (SYR)
Takao Kurimoto (JPN)	1–5	Mohsen Bukshaisha (QAT)
Marvin Lim (SIN)	5–3	Saleh Mohammad (AFG)
Amir Sarkhosh (IRI)	5–0	Mubarak Al-Owais (KUW)
Enkhbaataryn Enkhjargal (MGL)	0–5	Yu Delu (CHN)

Round of 16; 30 June
Xiao Guodong (CHN)	5
Reza Hassan (MAS)	1
Lin Shu-hung (TPE)	5
Ratchayothin Yotharuck (THA)	4
Mamoun Mahameed (PLE)	3
Hossein Vafaei (IRI)	5
Ali Al-Obaidly (QAT)	5
Shahbaz Adil Khan (AOI)	2
Mohammed Al-Jokar (UAE)	1
Sundeep Gulati (AOI)	5
Yoni Rachmanto (INA)	0
Omar Al-Kojah (SYR)	5
Mohsen Bukshaisha (QAT)	3
Marvin Lim (SIN)	5
Amir Sarkhosh (IRI)	5
Yu Delu (CHN)	4

Quarterfinals; 1 July
Xiao Guodong (CHN)	5
Lin Shu-hung (TPE)	2
Hossein Vafaei (IRI)	3
Ali Al-Obaidly (QAT)	5
Sundeep Gulati (AOI)	2
Omar Al-Kojah (SYR)	5
Marvin Lim (SIN)	1
Amir Sarkhosh (IRI)	5

Semifinals; 1 July
Xiao Guodong (CHN)	5
Ali Al-Obaidly (QAT)	0
Omar Al-Kojah (SYR)	2
Amir Sarkhosh (IRI)	5

Gold medal match 1 July
Xiao Guodong (CHN)	5
Amir Sarkhosh (IRI)	4

=== Women ===
==== Nine-ball singles ====
Round of 32 – 4 July
Neena Praveen (AOI)	7–6	Amy Hoe (SIN)
Iris Ranola (PHI)	4–7	Huỳnh Thị Ngọc Huyền (VIE)
Nicha Pathomekmongkhon (THA)	3–7	Tan Ho-yun (TPE)
Djajalie Klaudia (MAS)	7–6	Amanda Rahayu (INA)
Đoàn Thị Ngọc Lệ (VIE)	7–1	Battulgyn Uyanga (MGL)
Jomeya Al-Doseri (BRN)	0–7	Suhana Dewi Sabtu (MAS)
Rubilen Amit (PHI)	4–7	Fu Xiaofang (CHN)
Charlene Chai (SIN)	7–4	Keerath Bhandaal (AOI)
Angeline Ticoalu (INA)	7–3	Siraphat Chitchomnart (THA)
Cha Yu-ram (KOR)	7–0	Aisan Malekara (IRI)

Round of 16; 4 July
Kim Ga-young (KOR)	7
Neena Praveen (AOI)	1
Huỳnh Thị Ngọc Huyền (VIE)	0
Liu Shasha (CHN)	7
Tan Ho-yun (TPE)	7
Fatema Yusuf Rajab (BRN)	0
Djajalie Klaudia (MAS)	5
Keiko Yukawa (JPN)	7
Chou Chieh-yu (TPE)	7
Đoàn Thị Ngọc Lệ (VIE)	1
Suhana Dewi Sabtu (MAS)	2
Fu Xiaofang (CHN)	7
Charlene Chai (SIN)	7
Angeline Ticoalu (INA)	6
Cha Yu-ram (KOR)	7
Chihiro Kawahara (JPN)	4

Quarterfinals; 5 July
Kim Ga-young (KOR)	7
Liu Shasha (CHN)	2
Tan Ho-yun (TPE)	7
Keiko Yukawa (JPN)	3
Chou Chieh-yu (TPE)	7
Fu Xiaofang (CHN)	4
Charlene Chai (SIN)	4
Cha Yu-ram (KOR)	7

Semifinals; 5 July
Kim Ga-young (KOR)	6
Tan Ho-yun (TPE)	7
Chou Chieh-yu (TPE)	2
Cha Yu-ram (KOR)	7

Gold medal match 6 July
Tan Ho-yun (TPE)	4
Cha Yu-ram (KOR)	7

==== Ten-ball singles ====
Round of 32 – 2 July
Chou Chieh-yu (TPE)	7–3	Chen Siming (CHN)
Iris Ranola (PHI)	7–2	Trần Thị Trúc Xinh (VIE)
Junnainy Hartono (INA)	7–3	Nahla Al-Sunni (BRN)
Chihiro Kawahara (JPN)	7–4	Kim Ga-young (KOR)
Tan Ho-yun (TPE)	3–7	Rubilen Amit (PHI)
Battulgyn Uyanga (MGL)	7–3	Aisan Malekara (IRI)
Keiko Yukawa (JPN)	3–7	Fathrah Masum (INA)
Djajalie Klaudia (MAS)	1–7	Pan Xiaoting (CHN)
Cha Yu-ram (KOR)	7–4	Siraphat Chitchomnart (THA)

Round of 16; 3 July
Keerath Bhandaal (AOI)	0
Chou Chieh-yu (TPE)	7
Iris Ranola (PHI)	6
Amy Hoe (SIN)	7
Suhana Dewi Sabtu (MAS)	7
Junnainy Hartono (INA)	4
Chihiro Kawahara (JPN)	7
Amornrat Uamduang (THA)	3
Indira Gowda (AOI)	0
Rubilen Amit (PHI)	7
Battulgyn Uyanga (MGL)	5
Fathrah Masum (INA)	7
Charlene Chai (SIN)	5
Pan Xiaoting (CHN)	7
Cha Yu-ram (KOR)	7
Huỳnh Thị Ngọc Huyền (VIE)	4

Quarterfinals; 3 July
Chou Chieh-yu (TPE)	7
Amy Hoe (SIN)	1
Suhana Dewi Sabtu (MAS)	2
Chihiro Kawahara (JPN)	7
Rubilen Amit (PHI)	7
Fathrah Masum (INA)	3
Pan Xiaoting (CHN)	2
Cha Yu-ram (KOR)	7

Semifinals; 3 July
Chou Chieh-yu (TPE)	4
Chihiro Kawahara (JPN)	7
Rubilen Amit (PHI)	3
Cha Yu-ram (KOR)	7

Gold medal match 4 July
Chihiro Kawahara (JPN)	3
Cha Yu-ram (KOR)	7

==== Six-red snooker singles ====
Round of 32 – 29 June – 1 July
Đoàn Thị Ngọc Lệ (VIE)	4–0	Suhana Dewi Sabtu (MAS)
Floriza Andal (PHI)	0–4	Nicha Pathomekmongkhon (THA)
Jigdengiin Otgonbayar (MGL)	2–4	Tahereh Eslami (IRI)
Trần Thị Trúc Xinh (VIE)	0–4	Huang Hsin (TPE)
Bayarsaikhany Narantuyaa (MGL)	0–4	Choi Sol-lip (KOR)
Mandana Farhadi (IRI)	0–4	Jaique Ip (HKG)

Round of 16; 1 July
Shi Chunxia (CHN)	4
Đoàn Thị Ngọc Lệ (VIE)	0
Lai Hui-shan (TPE)	2
Chitra Magimairaj (AOI)	4
Amy Hoe (SIN)	1
Nicha Pathomekmongkhon (THA)	4
Tahereh Eslami (IRI)	1
Ng On Yee (HKG)	4
Amornrat Uamduang (THA)	4
Huang Hsin (TPE)	0
Choi Sol-lip (KOR)	4
Neena Praveen (AOI)	3
Lim Siew Boon (MAS)	4
Charlene Chai (SIN)	1
Jaique Ip (HKG)	4
Han Yu (CHN)	1

Quarterfinals; 2 July
Shi Chunxia (CHN)	3
Chitra Magimairaj (AOI)	4
Nicha Pathomekmongkhon (THA)	2
Ng On Yee (HKG)	4
Amornrat Uamduang (THA)	4
Choi Sol-lip (KOR)	1
Lim Siew Boon (MAS)	1
Jaique Ip (HKG)	4

Semifinals; 2 July
Chitra Magimairaj (AOI)	1
Ng On Yee (HKG)	4
Amornrat Uamduang (THA)	4
Jaique Ip (HKG)	1

Gold medal match 2 July
Ng On Yee (HKG)	3
Amornrat Uamduang (THA)	4
