= Sri Lankan Chess Championship =

The Sri Lankan Chess Championship is organised by the Chess Federation of Sri Lanka, and was first held in 1972. The Sri Lankan Women's Chess Championship was first held in 1979.

== National championship winners ==
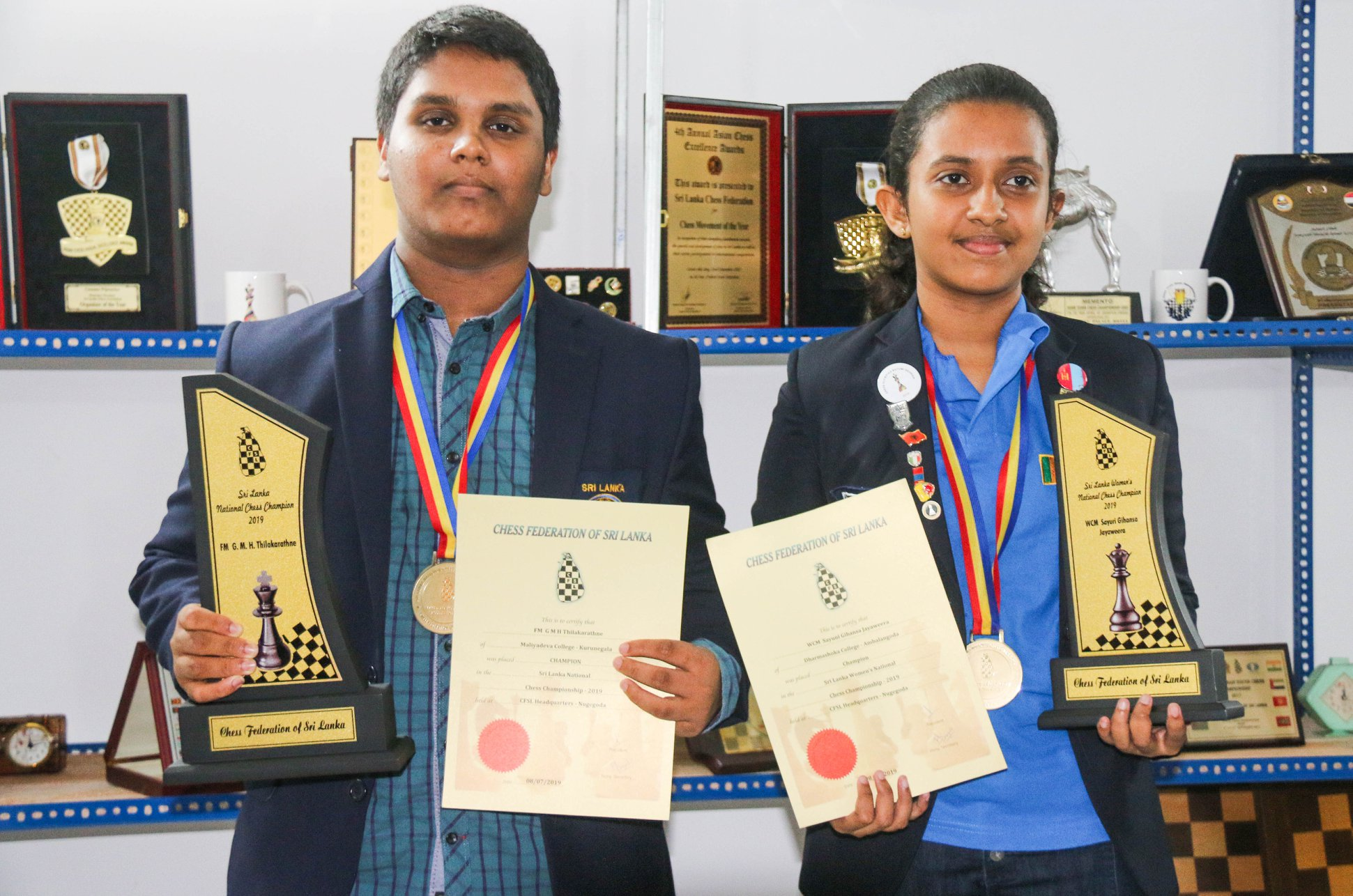
Sri Lanka National Chess Champions 2019 Champion : Harshana Thilakarathne and Women's Champion: Sayuni Gihansa Jayaweera – {(c) Ruwan Gunarathne)}

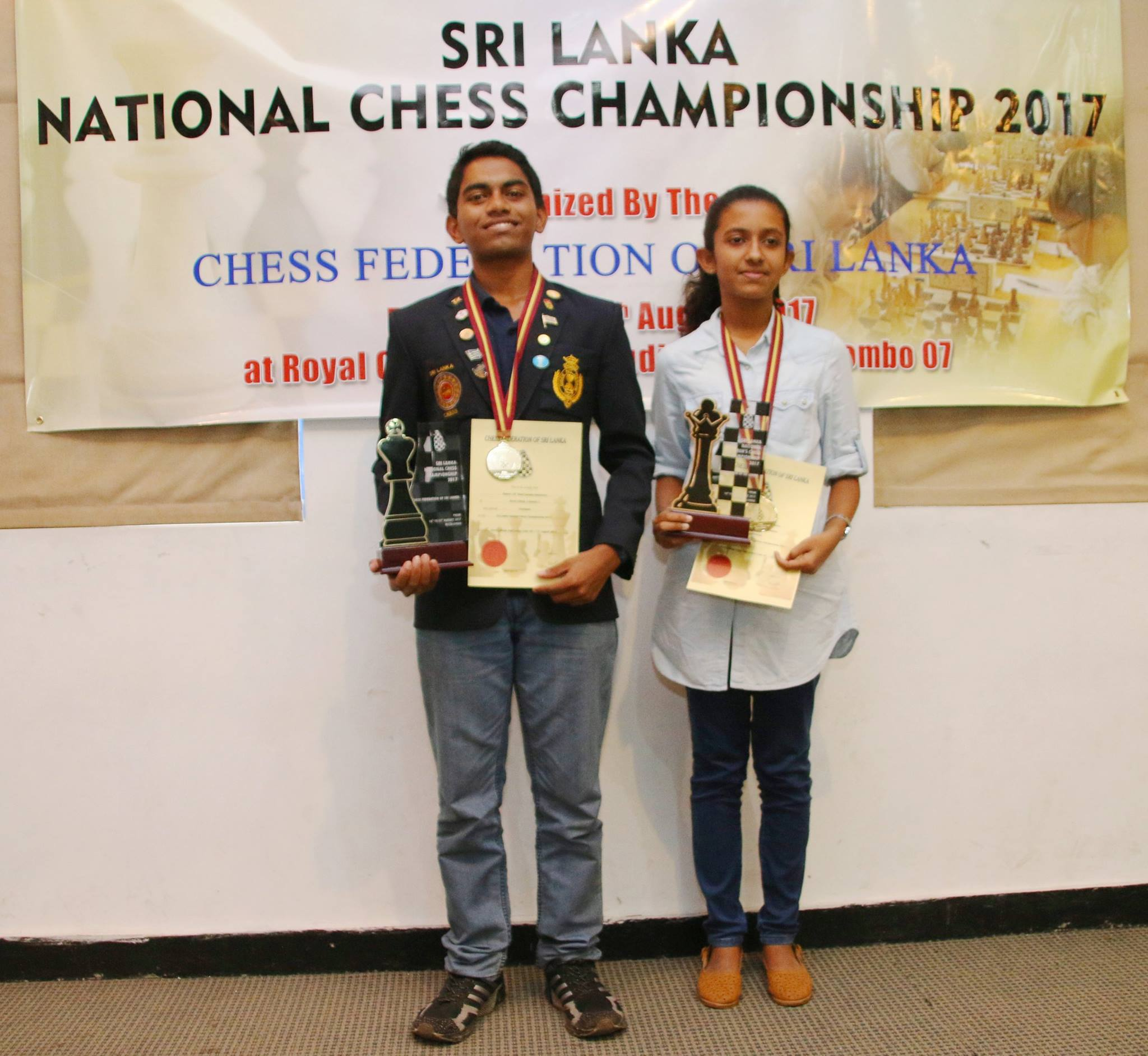
Sri Lanka National Chess Champions 2017 Champion : Minul Doluweera and Women's Champion: Sayuni Gihansa Jayaweera – {(c) Ruwan Gunarathne)}

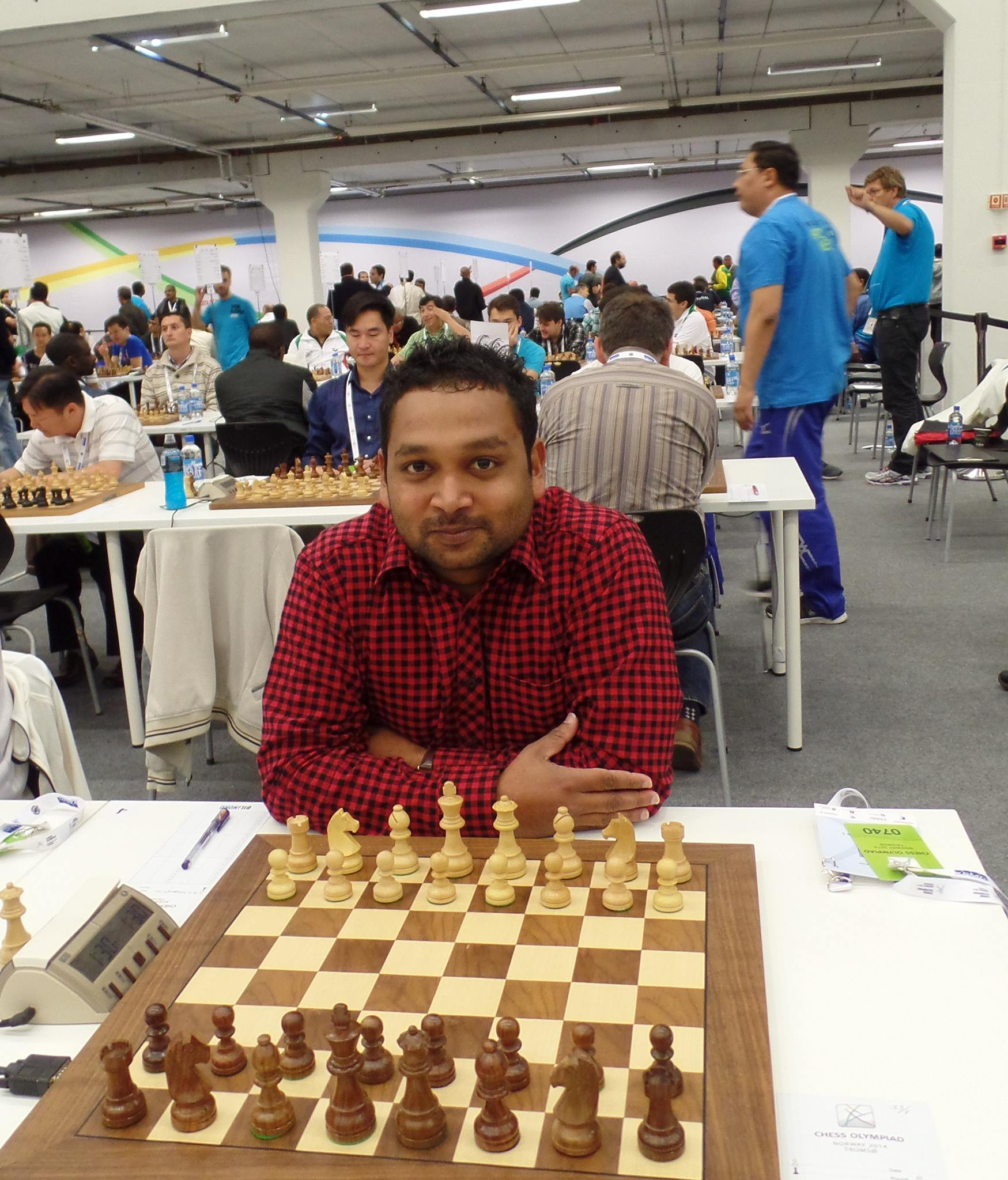
Rajeendra Kalugampitiya – National Chess Champion 2016

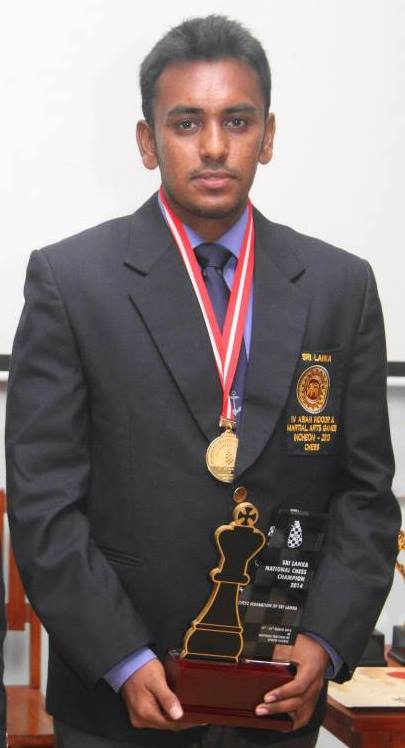
National Chess Champion Isuru Alahakoon 2012–2014.jpg

Year	Champion
1972/73	Christoper Parakrama
1974	G. A. S. Dissnayake
1975	R. Ananthan
1976	R. J. D. Ferdinands
1977	Harsha Aturupane
1978	L. C. Goonethilleke
1979	L. C. Goonethilleke and C. S. S. Pitigala (joint champions)
1980	T. D. R. Peiris and Harinlal Aturupane (joint champions)
1981	Harsha Aturupane
1982	Harsha Aturupane
1983	T. D. R. Peiris
1984	Harinlal Aturupane
1985	Harinlal Aturupane
1986	Harinlal Aturupane
1987	Ishan Weerakoon
1988	Harinlal Aturupane
1989	Harinlal Aturupane
1990	Not Held
1991	Not Held
1992	Harinlal Aturupane
1993	Not Held
1994	Muditha Hettigama
1995	T. D. R. Peiris
1996	Luxman Wijesuriya
1997	Nirosh De Silva
1998	Not Held
1999	Nirosh De Silva, Ruchira Amarasinghe, Uddama Amarawickrama (joint champions)
2000	Luxman Wijesuriya
2001	Nirosh de Silva
2002	Nirosh de Silva
2003	Athula Russell
2004	T. D. R. Peiris
2005	Athula Russell
2006	Athula Russell
2007	G. C. Anuruddha
2008	Athula Russell
2009	Athula Russell
2010	Athula Russell
2011	Chamika Perera
2012	Isuru Alahakoon
2013	Isuru Alahakoon
2014	Isuru Alahakoon
2015	Dulan Edirisinghe
2016	Rajeendra Kalugampitiya
2017	Minul Doluweera
2018	Isuru Alahakoon
2019	Harshana Thilakarathne
2020	Ranindu Dilshan Liyanage
2021	Susal Thewjan de Silva
2022	Susal Thewjan de Silva
2023	Susal Thewjan de Silva
2024	Ranindu Dilshan Liyanage

== Women's championship winners ==
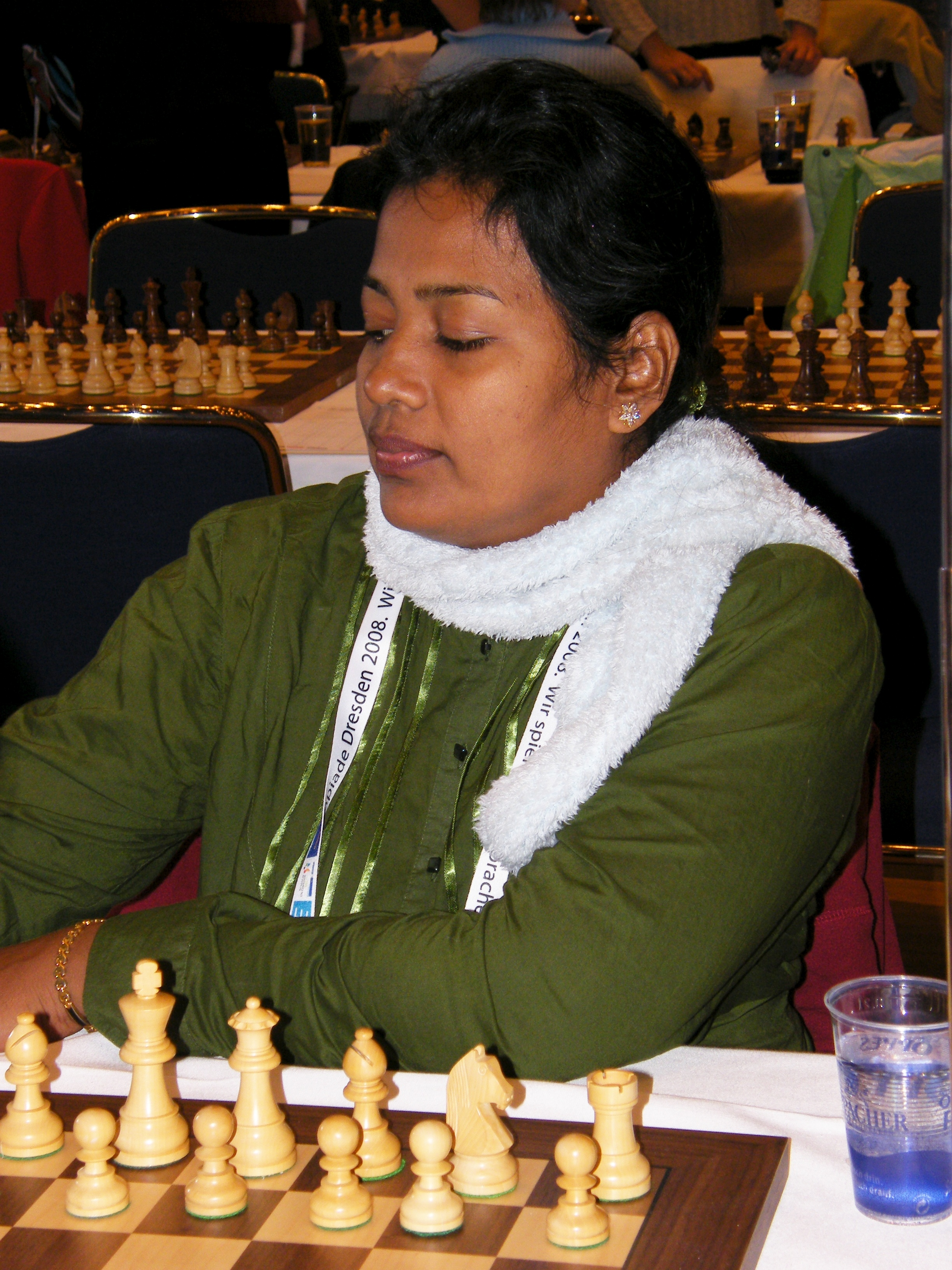
Vineetha Wijesuriya, eleven-time Sri Lankan women's chess champion from 1989 to 2008, and sister of ten-time winner Suneetha Wijesuriya

Year	Champion
1979	Anoja Senevirate
1980	Suneetha Wijesuriya and Rosana Jayasuriya
1981	Amarangi De Silva
1982	Suneetha Wijesuriya
1983	Suneetha Wijesuriya
1984	Suneetha Wijesuriya
1985	Amarangi De Silva
1986	Suneetha Wijesuriya
1987	Suneetha Wijesuriya
1988	Suneetha Wijesuriya
1989	Vineetha Wijesuriya and Nihara Amarawickrama
1990	Not Held
1991	Not Held
1992	Amarangi De Silva
1993	Not Held
1994	Amarangi De Silva
1995	Suneetha Wijesuriya
1996	Malintha Fernando
1997	Suneetha Wijesuriya
1998	Vineetha Wijesuriya
1999	Vineetha Wijesuriya
2000	Vineetha Wijesuriya
2001	Vineetha Wijesuriya
2002	Vineetha Wijesuriya
2003	Vineetha Wijesuriya
2004	U. G. Y. Methmali
2005	U. G. Y. Methmali
2006	Pramodya Senanayake
2007	Vineetha Wijesuriya
2008	Vineetha Wijesuriya
2009	Sachini Ranasinghe
2010	Dinushki Premanath
2011	Sachini Ranasinghe
2012	Sachini Ranasinghe
2013	Sachini Ranasinghe
2014	Dasuni Mendis
2015	Dasuni Mendis
2016	Saumy Zainab
2017	Sayuni Gihansa Jayaweera
2018	Dinushki Premanath
2019	Sayuni Gihansa Jayaweera
2020	Nethmi Fernando
2021	T H D Niklesha Tharushi
2022	Sachini Ranasinghe
2023	K M Dahamdi Sanudula
2024	Devindya Oshini Gunawardhana
