= Harshana Thilakarathne =

Sri Lankan chess player (born 2003)

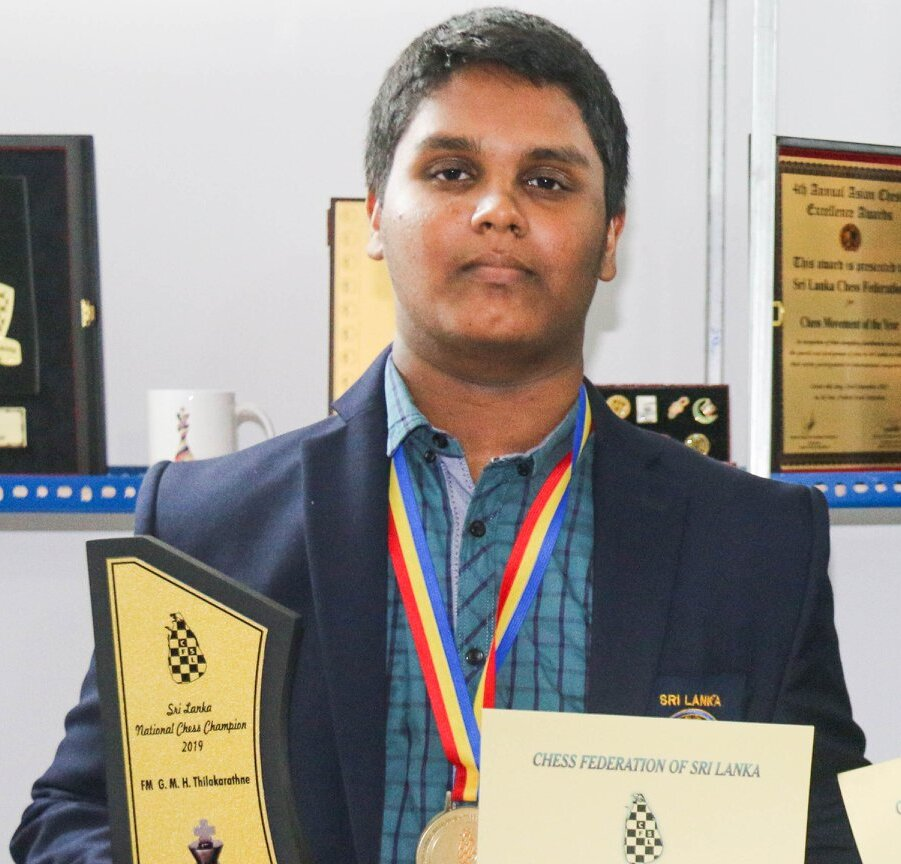

Personal information
- Born: G M Harshana Thilakarathne; 2003 (age 22–23)

Chess career
- Country: Sri Lanka
- Title: International Master (2020)
- Peak rating: 2446 (December 2018)

Harshana Thilakarathne (born 2003) is a Sri Lankan chess player and International Master. Currently, he is the no 2 chess player in Sri Lanka and completed his education at the Maliyadeva College, Kurunegala. He is trained by Dmytro Komarow. He started training in the game under the coaching of former veteran national chess player Romesh Weerawardane.

== Career ==
Harshana claimed a bronze medal in the Under 7 age category at the 2009 Asian Schools Chess Championship which was held in Sri Lanka. He also claimed gold medal in Under 11 age category at the 2014 World Schools Chess Championship which was held in Brazil. He was awarded the Candidate Master title in 2015. He claimed silver medal in Under 13 category at the 2016 World Schools Chess Championship which was held in Sochi, Russia. He also won silver medal in Under 15 category at the 2018 World Schools Chess Championship which was held in Albania. He also won gold medal in Under 16 open category at the 2018 Commonwealth Chess Championship which was held in New Delhi. In the same year, he was awarded the FIDE master title. He also competed at the 43rd Chess Olympiad which was held in Georgia in 2018 where he scored 6 points from 10 matches.

He won his first national chess championship title at the age of 16 in 2019. He also secured silver medal in the Under 18 open event at the 2019 West Asian Youth Chess Championship which was held in New Delhi. He captained the 12 member Sri Lankan contingent in the FIDE Online Chess Olympiad 2020. He was also selected to play in the Online Intercontinental Youth Chess Cup 2020 representing the Asuan Youth Chess team. He also captained the Sri Lankan boys team at the 2020 Asian Boys and Girls Online Chess Championship in their Zonal 3.2 category where boys team secured third position and it was also the inaugural online edition of the Asian Boys and Girls tournament.

In October 2020, he was awarded the prestigious International Master title by the World Chess Federation and became the second Sri Lankan to be awarded the international master title after Romesh Weerawardane. He received the title after securing three norms with the required rating of 2400.

In September 2021, he won the Under 18 category of the 2021 Western Asian Online Youth Chess Championships and his victory also guaranteed his eligibility to compete in the FIDE World Youth and Cadet Chess Grand Prix 2021.

== See also ==
- List of Maliyadeva College alumni
