= Cha Yu-ram =

South Korean pool player

Medal record

Representing South Korea

Women's Pool & Snooker

Asian Indoor Games
Gold medal – first place	2009 Ho Chi Minh	Nine-ball singles

East Asian Games
Bronze medal – third place	2009 Hong Kong	6-red Snooker

Asian Indoor and Martial Arts Games
Gold medal – first place	2013 Incheon	Nine-ball singles
Gold medal – first place	2013 Incheon	Ten-ball singles

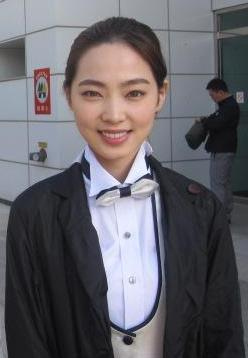
Cha Yu-Ram. 2013-10-22

Cha Yu-ram (Korean: 차유람; Hanja: 車游嵐, born July 23, 1987) is a South Korean professional pool player.

== History ==
She started playing tennis in 1995 when she was a freshman in elementary school. In September 2006, she began to announce her name with the opportunity to have a friendly game against the world billiard star Jeanette Lee. Since then, she has been a national player in the 2006 Doha Asian Games and the 2010 Guangzhou Asian Games. She won gold for nine-ball singles in the 2009 Asian Indoor Games. She signed a management agreement with IB Sports in March 2010. She signed an agreement with Icarus Sports, a sports professional agency, in 2013 when the contract with IB Sports was terminated. She married Lee Ji Sung on June 20, 2015. On November 10, 2015, she released her daughter on the 9th through the media and announced that she plans to concentrate on childcare without any broadcasting activities for the time being, with both mothers and children healthy.

== Career ==
- 2003: 1st place in Korean women's pocket 9 ball ranking
- 2004: pulsalang 9 Ball Open 1st place
- 2005: 1st place in Korean women's three-cushion competition
- 2005: 2nd place in KBF national pocket 9 ball championship
- 2006 : KBF Pocket 9 Ball National Tour Rankings Second in Game 1
- 2008: US Open semifinal
- 2008: Second place in the XTM Billiard Championship
- 2009: Hong Kong East Asian Games Cue Sports 6 Red Snooker bronze medal
- 2009: 1st place in the 9th Asian Asian Games Pocket 2009
- 2010: 2010 Amway Cup World Women's Open 9 Ball Open
- 2010: ChunCheon World Leisure Games Billiards Ambre Cup Pocket 9 Ball, Women's Billiards Second Run
- 2010: The 91st National Sports Festival Billiards Women's General Pocket 9-Ball Gold Medal (Demonstration Event)
- 2011: 1st place in the world 9-ball Beijing Open
- 2011: 1st place in the nation's pocket 9 ball open competition
- 2011: The 2nd Korean Billiards Federation President's Cup 10-ball runners-up
- 2012: The 3rd Korean Billiards Federation President's Cup 10-ball 1st place
- 2012: 3rd place Busan mayor's cup 10-ball 1st place
- 2012: 1st place in the 4th Pocket M-Tour Tournament
- 2012: 3rd place in world women's 10-ball championship
- 2012: The 93rd National Athletic Meet Billiards Women's General Pocket 9 Ball bronze medal
- 2012: The 8th Korea Sports Council 10-ball 3rd place
- 2013: 2nd place in 2013 pocket M-Tour 1st round
- 2013: The 9th Korea Sports Council 9-ball 2nd place
- 2013: The 4th Korean Billiards Federation President 9-ball 2nd place
- 2013: 2013 Indoor Asian Games 10-Ball Gold
- 2013: 2013 Indoor Asian Games 9-Ball Gold
- 2013: Suwon Cup national pocket billiard competition 9 ball first place
- 2013: 2013 CBSA Beijing Mewin 9-Ball Open 1st place
- 2013: The 94th National Sports Festival 10-Ball Gold Medal
- 2014: 2014 CBSA Guangzhou International No. 9 Open 2nd place
