= Isuru Alahakoon =

Sri Lankan chess player (born 1987)

Personal information
- Born: November 29, 1987 (age 38) Kandy, Sri Lanka

Chess career
- Country: Sri Lanka
- Title: FIDE Master (2019)
- Peak rating: 2188 (September 2014)

Isuru Alahakoon is a Sri Lankan chess player who holds the title of FIDE Master.

== Chess career ==
He won the Sri Lankan Chess Championship in 2012, 2013, 2014, and 2018. He obtained the FIDE Master title at the Asian Zonal 3.2 Championship in May 2019.

He played for Sri Lanka in the Chess Olympiads of 2014, 2018, and 2022. In the 2014 Olympiad, he was the gold medalist in the D category.
