= Rajeendra Kalugampitiya =

Sri Lankan chess player (born 1988)

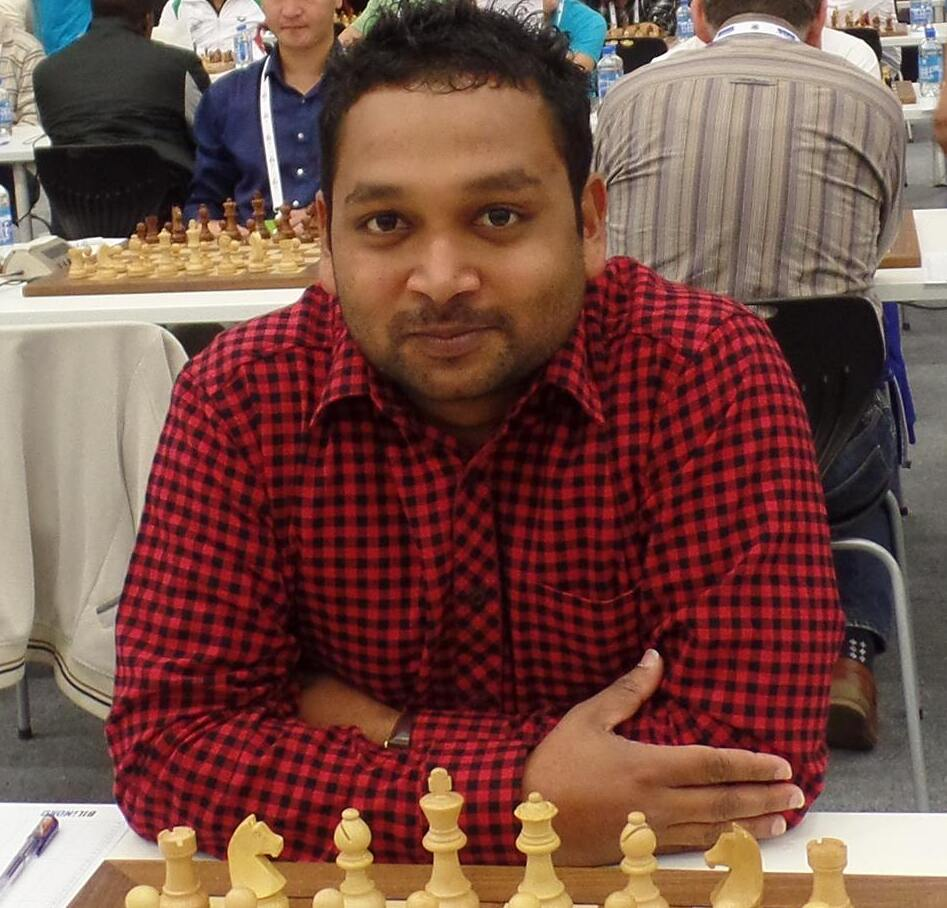

Personal information
- Born: 1988 (age 37–38) Kandy, Sri Lanka

Chess career
- Country: Sri Lanka
- Title: FIDE Master (2017)
- Peak rating: 2164 (January 2019)

Rajeendra S. Kalugampitiya is a Sri Lankan chess player. He is a FIDE Master and FIDE trainer.

== Chess career ==
He won the Sri Lankan Chess Championship in 2016.

He has served as the vice president of the Sri Lankan Chess Federation.

He is a chess coach at Hillwood College and served as the coach for the Sri Lankan team in the FIDE Online Chess Olympiad 2020.
