= Maya Jalloul =

Lebanese chess player (born 1990)

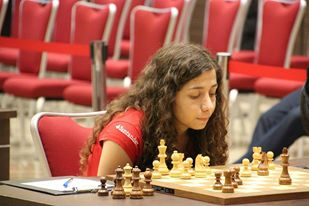

Personal information
- Born: 16 April 1990 (age 36) Simferopol, Ukraine

Chess career
- Country: Lebanon
- Title: Woman FIDE Master (2003)
- Peak rating: 1961 (March 2013)

Maya Jalloul (مايا جلول; born 16 April 1990) is a Lebanese chess champion.

== Education ==
Jalloul has a bachelor's degree in mathematics from the American University of Beirut and a master's degree in actuarial science from the Saint Joseph University. She is currently pursuing her PhD in economics at the Queen Mary University of London.

== Chess career ==
After winning several local and student competitions, Jalloul won the Arab U-18 women championship in 2007, then the Lebanese Women Championship in 2009 while ranking second in the Arab women championship in 2009. Jalloul also participated in numerous international chess competitions, including the 39th Chess Olympiad in 2008 in Dresden, Germany, and in the 40th Chess Olympiad in 2012 in Istanbul, Turkey. On the regional level she also competed in the 8th Mediterranean games in Beirut, Lebanon, in 2013, the Arab tournament in Jordan in 2010, the Arab games in Qatar in 2011 and the West Asia chess championship in Qatar in 2013
Jalloul is a Woman FIDE Master (WFM) since 2003.
