= Vineetha Wijesuriya =

Australian chess player (born 1970)

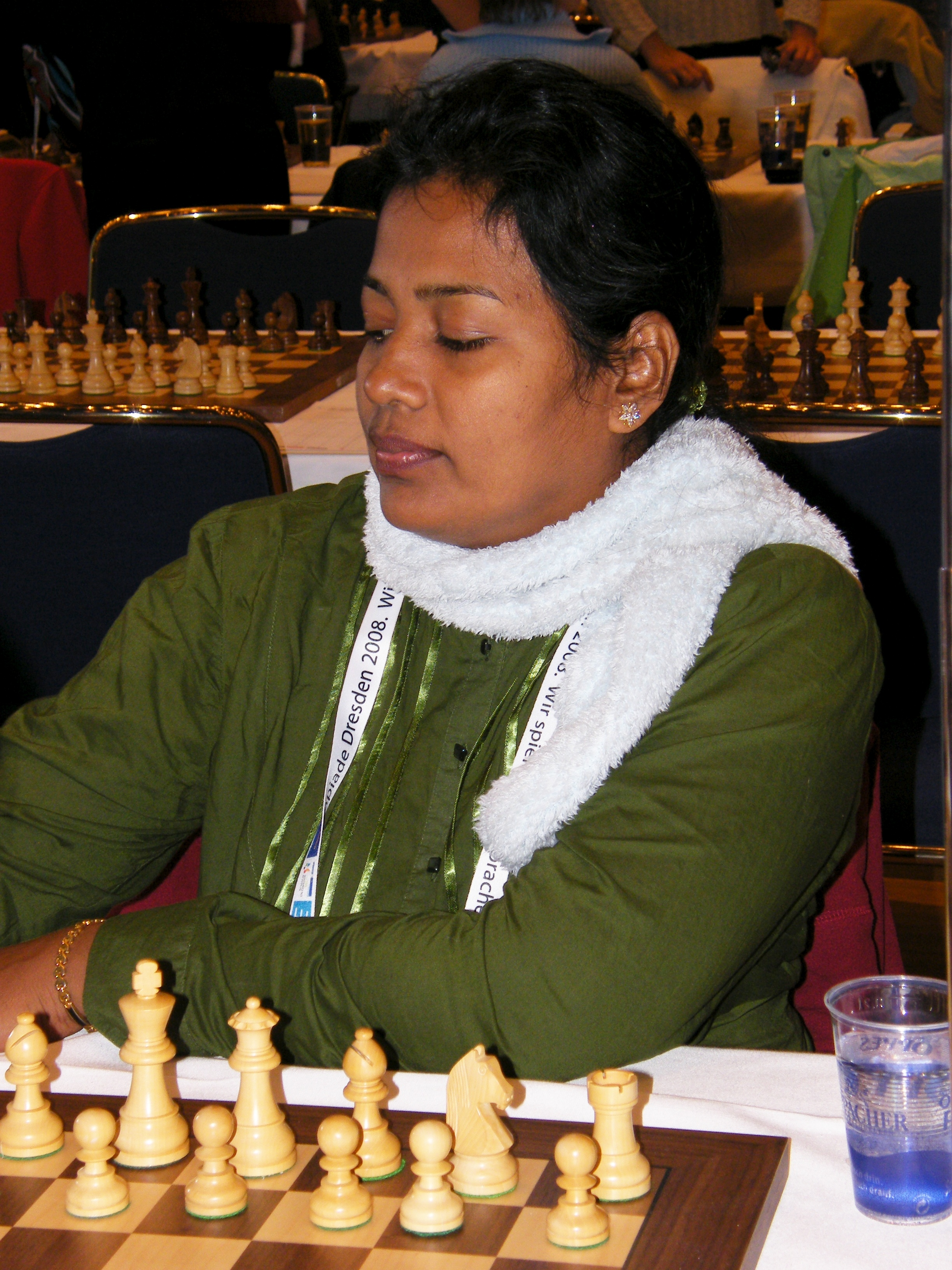
- Wijesuriya at 2008 Chess Olympiad

Personal information
- Born: G. Vineetha Wijesuriya; 1970 (age 55–56) Colombo, Sri Lanka

Chess career
- Country: Sri Lanka (until 2010); Australia (since 2010)
- Title: Woman Candidate Master (2004)
- Peak rating: 2037 (October 2004)

Vineetha Wijesuriya (born 1970) is an Australian female chess player born in Sri Lanka. She has been living in Victoria, Australia, since 2008.. She concluded her chess career in Sri Lanka in 2008 by winning both the Women’s National Chess Championship and the female Champion of the Mora King Chess event.

She began playing at the age of nine. She learned the names of the chess pieces and their movements from her sister and mastered them with her brother Luxman. After she worked with IM Mr. Manuel Aaron from India in 1998, she consecutively won six women's chess national Championships in Sri Lanka. She was the national female chess champion of Sri Lanka for 11 years. She holds a few Sri Lankan records in Chess, such as the most points on board number one in the World Chess Olympiad, which was held in Istanbul, Turkey, in 2000. She came third in the World Varsity Chess Championship in Malayasia. She participated in 6 Chess Olympiads in Manila 1992, Armania 1996, Turkey 2000, Slovenia 2002, Spain (non-playing captain) 2004 and Germany 2008. She only played board number one three times and board number two twice. She captained the team four times out of her six olympiads. Vineetha became Australia's best female chess player in 2010(Sydney) and 2012(Geelong). Vineetha Wijesuriya also won the Asian female Chess Championship for under 2000-rated players in 2013 and represented Australia for the World Chess Championship in the same category in Romania. In 2014, she won the Oceania Zonal Chess Championship in the women's category. She was a student of Gothatuwa Maha Vidyalaya, Buddhist Ladies' College, Colombo 7, and the Ayurveda College of Sri Lanka. She was also a student of the Chisholm Institute, the University of Monash, and Swinburne.
