= Sachini Ranasinghe =

Sri Lankan chess player (born 1994)

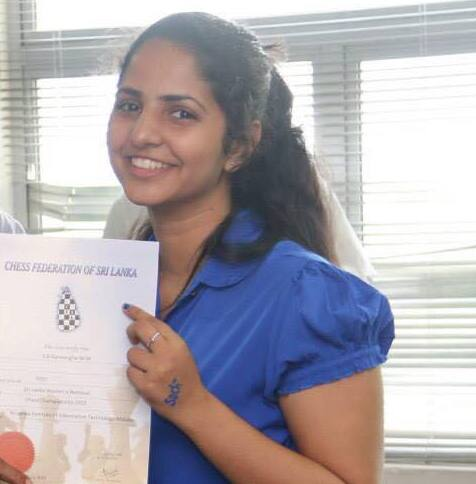

Personal information
- Born: Sachini D. Ranasinghe; 1994 (age 31–32) Abu Dhabi, United Arab Emirates

Chess career
- Country: Sri Lanka
- Title: Woman International Master (2011)
- FIDE rating: 1725 (April 2021)
- Peak rating: 1913 (March 2012)

Sachini D. Ranasinghe (born 1994), also known as S.D. Ranasinghe, is a Sri Lankan chess player who holds the title of Woman International Master (WIM, 2011). She is the first Sri Lankan player to get awarded the title of Woman International Master and only Sri Lankan player to win Asian zonal 3.2 chess championship and participate at the World chess Cup in 2012. She is a five-time winner of the Sri Lankan Women's Chess Championship (2009, 2011, 2012, 2013 and 2022). She is the strongest Sri Lankan women chess player in this era.

== Biography ==
Born in Abu Dhabi, Sachini was first introduced to chess by her brother Sahan Ranasinghe. She began playing chess in the Anatoly Karpov chess club at the Russian Center in Sri Lanka and have trained under several renowned chess players, including her current coach Ransith Fernando.

Sachini appeared in TV commercials as a child and was also the brand ambassador for Acnes Sri Lanka. To interest little children about the game of chess, she wrote a book called Thumula and his strange army.

== Championships ==
She won the Sri Lanka Women's Chess Championship in 2009, 2011, 2012 and 2013. In 2011, she won the Asian Zonal Women's Chess Championship and won the right to participate in the Women's World Championship. In 2012, in Khanty-Mansiysk made her debut at the Women's World Chess Championship, where in the first round she lost to Hou Yifan.

She played for Sri Lanka at three Women's Chess Olympiads (2010, 2016, 2018) and three Women's Asian Team Chess Championships (2008—2009, 2016).
