= Kuwait at the 2025 World Aquatics Championships =

- Flag of Kuwait
- World Aquatics code: KUW
- National federation: Kuwait Aquatics

in Singapore
- Competitors: 4 in 1 sport
- Medals: Gold 0 Silver 0 Bronze 0 Total 0

World Aquatics Championships appearances
- 1978; 1982; 1986; 1991; 1994; 1998; 2001; 2003; 2005; 2007; 2009; 2011; 2013; 2015; 2017; 2019; 2022; 2023; 2024; 2025

Kuwait is competing at the 2025 World Aquatics Championships in Singapore from 11 July to 3 August 2025.

== Competitors ==
The following is the list of competitors in the Championships.

Sport	Men	Women	Total
Swimming	3	1	4
Total	3	1	4

== Swimming ==
Men

Athlete	Event	Heat		Semifinal		Final	
Athlete	Event	Time	Rank	Time	Rank	Time	Rank
Khaled Al-Otaibi	100 m freestyle	54.31	82	Did not advance			
Khaled Al-Otaibi	100 m breaststroke	1:08.61	67	Did not advance			
Mohammad Al-Otaibi	100 m butterfly	58.09	66	Did not advance			
Mohammad Al-Otaibi	200 m butterfly	2:11.76	35	Did not advance			
Sauod Al-Shamroukh	200 m freestyle	1:54.61	47	Did not advance			

Women

Athlete	Event	Heat		Semifinal		Final	
Athlete	Event	Time	Rank	Time	Rank	Time	Rank
Saba Sultan	50 m freestyle	31.27	90	Did not advance			
