= Short course swimming at the 2013 Asian Indoor and Martial Arts Games =

- Venue: Dowon Aquatics Center
- Dates: 30 June – 3 July 2013

Short course swimming at the 2013 Asian Indoor and Martial Arts Games, was held at the Dowon Aquatics Center. The competition took place from 30 June to 3 July 2013.

== Medalists ==
=== Men ===
Event	Gold		Silver		Bronze	
50 m freestyle	Yang Jung-doo; South Korea	21.83; GR	Triady Fauzi Sidiq; Indonesia	22.30	Chang Kuo-chi; Chinese Taipei	22.42
50 m freestyle	Yang Jung-doo; South Korea	21.83; GR	Triady Fauzi Sidiq; Indonesia	22.30	Yevgeniy Azaryev; Kazakhstan	22.42
100 m freestyle	Hoàng Quý Phước; Vietnam	48.98	Liu Junwu; China	49.18	Yevgeniy Azaryev; Kazakhstan	49.57
200 m freestyle	Mao Feilian; China	1:44.54; GR	Hoàng Quý Phước; Vietnam	1:46.00	Zhang Zhongchao; China	1:46.47
200 m freestyle	Mao Feilian; China	1:44.54; GR	Hoàng Quý Phước; Vietnam	1:46.00	Jeong Jeong-soo; South Korea	1:46.47
50 m backstroke	Sun Xiaolei; China	23.50	Shin Hee-woong; South Korea	23.92	Alexandr Tarabrin; Kazakhstan	24.11
100 m backstroke	Alexandr Tarabrin; Kazakhstan	50.75; GR	Sun Xiaolei; China	51.30	Shin Hee-woong; South Korea	53.18
50 m breaststroke	Ju Jang-hun; South Korea	27.43	Roman Trussov; Kazakhstan	27.69	Shin Hyeong-keun; South Korea	27.75
100 m breaststroke	Ju Jang-hun; South Korea	59.28	Choi Kyu-woong; South Korea	59.75	Roman Trussov; Kazakhstan	59.95
50 m butterfly	Yang Jung-doo; South Korea	23.15	Chang Gyu-cheol; South Korea	23.76	Glenn Victor Sutanto; Indonesia	23.81
100 m butterfly	Chang Gyu-cheol; South Korea	51.56	Glenn Victor Sutanto; Indonesia	51.82	Hoàng Quý Phước; Vietnam	52.68
100 m individual medley	Sun Xiaolei; China	53.72; GR	Radomyos Matjiur; Thailand	54.87	Dmitriy Gordiyenko; Kazakhstan	55.32
200 m individual medley	Mao Feilian; China	1:56.61; GR	Trần Duy Khôi; Vietnam	2:00.24	Choi Kyu-woong; South Korea	2:00.35
4 × 50 m freestyle relay	China; Liu Junwu; Mao Feilian; Sun Xiaolei; Zhang Zhongchao	1:28.64; GR	Kazakhstan; Roman Trussov; Andrey Zubakov; Stanislav Kuzmin; Yevgeniy Azaryev	1:29.10	South Korea; Shin Hee-woong; Chang Gyu-cheol; Jeong Jeong-soo; Yang Jung-doo	1:30.08
4 × 100 m freestyle relay	China; Liu Junwu; Mao Feilian; Xu Zhijie; Zhang Zhongchao	3:15.74; GR	Hong Kong; Jeremy Wong; Derick Ng; Kent Cheung; David Wong	3:18.62	South Korea; Jeong Jeong-soo; Chang Gyu-cheol; Im Tae-jeong; Yang Jung-doo	3:19.48
4 × 50 m medley relay	China; Sun Xiaolei; Xue Jiajia; Xu Zhijie; Liu Junwu	1:36.00; GR	South Korea; Shin Hee-woong; Shin Hyeong-keun; Chang Gyu-cheol; Yang Jung-doo	1:36.38	Kazakhstan; Alexandr Tarabrin; Roman Trussov; Stanislav Kuzmin; Yevgeniy Azaryev; Stanislav Ossinskiy; Yevgeniy Ryzhkov; Andrey Zubakov	1:36.55
4 × 100 m medley relay	China; Sun Xiaolei; Mao Feilian; Xu Zhijie; Zhang Zhongchao	3:30.20; GR	South Korea; Shin Hee-woong; Ju Jang-hun; Chang Gyu-cheol; Jeong Jeong-soo	3:31.65	Kazakhstan; Alexandr Tarabrin; Roman Trussov; Stanislav Kuzmin; Yevgeniy Azaryev; Stanislav Ossinskiy; Yevgeniy Ryzhkov; Andrey Zubakov	3:34.11

=== Women ===
Event	Gold		Silver		Bronze	
50 m freestyle	Jenjira Srisa-ard; Thailand	25.21	Sze Hang Yu; Hong Kong	25.22	Elmira Aigaliyeva; Kazakhstan	25.23
100 m freestyle	Elmira Aigaliyeva; Kazakhstan	54.79	Yang Chin-kuei; Chinese Taipei	54.89	Natthanan Junkrajang; Thailand	54.92
200 m freestyle	Wang Fei; China	1:57.19; GR	Yang Chin-kuei; Chinese Taipei	1:57.51	Natthanan Junkrajang; Thailand	1:58.25
50 m backstroke	Zhou Yanxin; China	27.24; GR	Stephanie Au; Hong Kong	27.33	Yekaterina Rudenko; Kazakhstan	27.54
100 m backstroke	Zhou Yanxin; China	57.96; GR	Yekaterina Rudenko; Kazakhstan	59.01	Stephanie Au; Hong Kong	59.22
50 m breaststroke	Kim Go-eun; South Korea	31.01; GR	Back Su-yeon; South Korea	31.46	Chen I-chuan; Chinese Taipei	31.76
100 m breaststroke	Back Su-yeon; South Korea	1:06.34; GR	Kim Go-eun; South Korea	1:07.30	Chen I-chuan; Chinese Taipei	1:08.39
50 m butterfly	Hwang Seo-jin; South Korea	26.79	Yang Chin-kuei; Chinese Taipei	26.94	Shared silver	
50 m butterfly	Hwang Seo-jin; South Korea	26.79	Park Jin-young; South Korea	26.94	Shared silver	
100 m butterfly	Elmira Aigaliyeva; Kazakhstan	58.40	Park Jin-young; South Korea	58.95	Sze Hang Yu; Hong Kong	59.11
100 m individual medley	Zhou Yanxin; China	1:01.24; GR	Elmira Aigaliyeva; Kazakhstan	1:01.29	Sze Hang Yu; Hong Kong	1:01.60
200 m individual medley	Nguyễn Thị Ánh Viên; Vietnam	2:10.05; GR	Zhou Yanxin; China	2:10.36	Natthanan Junkrajang; Thailand	2:14.08
4 × 50 m freestyle relay	Thailand; Jenjira Srisa-ard; Nichapat Kaewpongmongkol; Benjaporn Sriphanomthorn; Natthanan Junkrajang; Pusanisa Sangplong	1:41.83	China; Wang Siqi; Zhou Yanxin; Chen Xiaojun; Wang Fei; Fan Rong; Liu Siwen	1:42.62	South Korea; Kim Go-eun; Park Jin-young; Kim Ji-hyun; Hwang Seo-jin	1:42.83
4 × 50 m freestyle relay	Thailand; Jenjira Srisa-ard; Nichapat Kaewpongmongkol; Benjaporn Sriphanomthorn; Natthanan Junkrajang; Pusanisa Sangplong	1:41.83	China; Wang Siqi; Zhou Yanxin; Chen Xiaojun; Wang Fei; Fan Rong; Liu Siwen	1:42.62	Hong Kong; Sze Hang Yu; Yu Wai Ting; Stephanie Au; Chan Kin Lok; Yvette Kong; Wong Yee Ching	1:42.83
4 × 100 m freestyle relay	China; Wang Siqi; Liu Siwen; Zhou Yanxin; Wang Fei; Ren Luomeng	3:41.63; GR	Thailand; Natthanan Junkrajang; Jenjira Srisa-ard; Nichapat Kaewpongmongkol; Benjaporn Sriphanomthorn	3:42.96	Hong Kong; Yu Wai Ting; Chan Kin Lok; Sze Hang Yu; Stephanie Au; Wong Yee Ching; Yvette Kong	3:43.47
4 × 50 m medley relay	South Korea; Kim Ji-hyun; Kim Go-eun; Park Jin-young; Hwang Seo-jin	1:50.17; GR	China; Zhou Yanxin; Liu Siwen; Gong Jie; Wang Fei	1:51.72	Hong Kong; Stephanie Au; Yvette Kong; Chan Kin Lok; Sze Hang Yu	1:51.75
4 × 100 m medley relay	China; Zhou Yanxin; Fan Rong; Gong Jie; Wang Fei	3:58.31; GR	South Korea; Kim Ji-hyun; Back Su-yeon; Park Jin-young; Hwang Seo-jin	3:59.82	Hong Kong; Stephanie Au; Yvette Kong; Chan Kin Lok; Sze Hang Yu; Wong Yee Ching; Yu Wai Ting	4:00.77

== Medal table ==
Rank	Nation	Gold	Silver	Bronze	Total
1	China (CHN)	14	5	1	20
2	South Korea (KOR)	9	10	7	26
3	Kazakhstan (KAZ)	3	4	9	16
4	Thailand (THA)	2	2	3	7
5	Vietnam (VIE)	2	2	1	5
6	Hong Kong (HKG)	0	3	7	10
7	Chinese Taipei (TPE)	0	3	3	6
8	Indonesia (INA)	0	2	1	3
Totals (8 entries)		30	31	32	93

== Results ==
=== Men ===
==== 50 m freestyle ====
30 June

Rank	Athlete	Heats	Final
1st place, gold medalist(s)	Yang Jung-doo (KOR)	22.15	21.83
2nd place, silver medalist(s)	Triady Fauzi Sidiq (INA)	22.47	22.30
3rd place, bronze medalist(s)	Chang Kuo-chi (TPE)	22.50	22.42
3rd place, bronze medalist(s)	Yevgeniy Azaryev (KAZ)	22.64	22.42
5	Liu Junwu (CHN)	22.69	22.62
6	Mohammad Madwa (KUW)	22.90	22.79
7	Jeremy Wong (HKG)	22.90	22.80
8	Yan Ho Chun (HKG)	22.68	22.98
9	Zhang Zhongchao (CHN)	23.00	
10	Hoàng Quý Phước (VIE)	23.08	
11	Stanislav Kuzmin (KAZ)	23.17	
11	Gavin Lewis (THA)	23.17	
13	Mohammad Bidarian (IRI)	23.18	
14	Lao Kuan Fong (MAC)	23.38	
15	Papungkorn Ingkanont (THA)	23.42	
16	Arsham Mirzaei (IRI)	23.47	
17	Charles Walker (PHI)	23.53	
18	Stanislav Karnaukhov (KGZ)	23.60	
19	Ahmad Hussain (KUW)	23.72	
20	Lei Cheok Fong (MAC)	23.96	
21	Sergeý Krowýakow (TKM)	24.47	
22	Farhan Saleh Farhan (BRN)	24.73	
23	Batsaikhany Dölgöön (MGL)	25.09	
24	Mohammed Abdo (PLE)	25.13	
25	Nawaf Al-Qasmi (OMA)	25.25	
26	Maximov Chamraen Youri (CAM)	25.37	
27	Batsaikhany Mönkhbayar (MGL)	25.60	
28	Jassim Al-Malki (QAT)	26.22	
29	Mohamed Muthasim Adnan (MDV)	27.26	
DQ	Guntur Pratama Putera (INA)	~~23.38~~	

- Guntur Pratama Putera of Indonesia originally finished 14th, but was disqualified after he tested positive for Methylhexanamine.

==== 100 m freestyle ====
3 July

Rank	Athlete	Heats	Final
1st place, gold medalist(s)	Hoàng Quý Phước (VIE)	49.69	48.98
2nd place, silver medalist(s)	Liu Junwu (CHN)	49.64	49.18
3rd place, bronze medalist(s)	Yevgeniy Azaryev (KAZ)	50.14	49.57
4	Jeremy Wong (HKG)	50.05	49.64
5	Jeong Jeong-soo (KOR)	50.30	49.74
6	Wang Yu-lian (TPE)	50.19	50.04
7	Mohammad Madwa (KUW)	50.32	50.45
8	Mohammad Bidarian (IRI)	50.33	50.87
9	Yang Jung-doo (KOR)	50.76	
10	Yousef Al-Askari (KUW)	50.79	
11	Siwat Matangkapong (THA)	50.99	
12	Triady Fauzi Sidiq (INA)	51.23	
13	Andrey Zubakov (KAZ)	51.28	
14	Chang Kuo-chi (TPE)	51.31	
15	Matthew Abeysinghe (SRI)	51.33	
16	Alexis Wijaya Ohmar (INA)	51.63	
17	Charles Walker (PHI)	51.68	
18	Papungkorn Ingkanont (THA)	51.71	
19	Arsham Mirzaei (IRI)	51.96	
20	Aleksandr Slepchenko (KGZ)	52.12	
21	Stanislav Karnaukhov (KGZ)	52.15	
22	Zhang Zhongchao (CHN)	52.53	
23	Mohammed Al-Shafee (UAE)	53.18	
24	Lao Kuan Fong (MAC)	53.22	
25	Wong Pok Iao (MAC)	53.68	
26	Sergeý Krowýakow (TKM)	54.84	
27	Anderson Lim (BRU)	54.92	
28	Batsaikhany Mönkhbayar (MGL)	55.66	
29	Batsaikhany Dölgöön (MGL)	55.93	
30	Mohamed Muthasim Adnan (MDV)	1:04.63	
—	David Wong (HKG)	DNS	

==== 200 m freestyle ====
2 July

Rank	Athlete	Heats	Final
1st place, gold medalist(s)	Mao Feilian (CHN)	1:48.12	1:44.54
2nd place, silver medalist(s)	Hoàng Quý Phước (VIE)	1:47.88	1:46.00
3rd place, bronze medalist(s)	Zhang Zhongchao (CHN)	1:48.99	1:46.47
3rd place, bronze medalist(s)	Jeong Jeong-soo (KOR)	1:49.00	1:46.47
5	Wang Yu-lian (TPE)	1:49.24	1:48.15
6	Yousef Al-Askari (KUW)	1:49.47	1:48.69
7	Kent Cheung (HKG)	1:50.85	1:51.01
8	Andrey Zubakov (KAZ)	1:50.47	1:52.40
9	Alexis Wijaya Ohmar (INA)	1:51.09	
10	Triady Fauzi Sidiq (INA)	1:52.14	
11	Jessie Lacuna (PHI)	1:52.38	
12	Georgiy Parashutov (KAZ)	1:52.65	
13	Matthew Abeysinghe (SRI)	1:52.79	
14	Aleksandr Slepchenko (KGZ)	1:53.05	
15	Stanislav Karnaukhov (KGZ)	1:53.08	
16	Siwat Matangkapong (THA)	1:53.25	
17	David Wong (HKG)	1:53.72	
18	Fahad Al-Khaldi (PHI)	1:54.37	
19	Sarit Tiewong (THA)	1:55.07	
20	Ahmad Hussain (KUW)	1:55.39	
21	Anderson Lim (BRU)	1:58.84	
22	Chou Kit (MAC)	1:59.15	
23	Ali Al-Kaabi (UAE)	1:59.48	
24	Farhan Saleh Farhan (BRN)	2:06.70	
25	Ghulam Muhammad (PAK)	2:07.03	
26	Mohammad Bidarian (IRI)	2:07.49	
27	Arsham Mirzaei (IRI)	2:08.70	

==== 50 m backstroke ====
1 July

Rank	Athlete	Heats	Final
1st place, gold medalist(s)	Sun Xiaolei (CHN)	23.65	23.50
2nd place, silver medalist(s)	Shin Hee-woong (KOR)	25.18	23.92
3rd place, bronze medalist(s)	Alexandr Tarabrin (KAZ)	24.24	24.11
4	Yang Jung-doo (KOR)	25.10	24.52
5	I Gede Siman Sudartawa (INA)	25.11	24.65
6	Stanislav Ossinskiy (KAZ)	25.34	25.35
7	Henry Ng (HKG)	25.72	25.60
8	Abdullah Al-Thuwaini (KUW)	25.74	26.13
9	Kasipat Chograthin (THA)	25.80	
10	Jamal Chavoshifar (IRI)	25.93	
11	Chang Kuo-chi (TPE)	25.96	
12	Johansen Aguilar (PHI)	26.09	
13	Kent Cheung (HKG)	26.40	
14	Wang Yu-lian (TPE)	26.69	
15	Aiman Al-Kulaibi (OMA)	27.67	
16	Wong Pok Iao (MAC)	27.92	
17	Antonio Tong (MAC)	28.15	
18	Napat Wesshasartar (THA)	28.32	
19	Glenn Victor Sutanto (INA)	28.34	
20	Fahad Al-Khaldi (PHI)	28.36	
21	Trần Duy Khôi (VIE)	28.61	
22	Mohammed Abdo (PLE)	28.65	
23	Haseeb Tariq (PAK)	29.86	
24	Jassim Al-Malki (QAT)	32.53	
25	Sereenendorjiin Ganduulga (MGL)	32.89	

==== 100 m backstroke ====
2 July

Rank	Athlete	Heats	Final
1st place, gold medalist(s)	Alexandr Tarabrin (KAZ)	51.73	50.75
2nd place, silver medalist(s)	Sun Xiaolei (CHN)	54.88	51.30
3rd place, bronze medalist(s)	Shin Hee-woong (KOR)	55.14	53.18
4	I Gede Siman Sudartawa (INA)	55.06	53.46
5	Stanislav Ossinskiy (KAZ)	54.62	54.00
6	Henry Ng (HKG)	55.98	55.10
7	Jamal Chavoshifar (IRI)	56.15	56.06
8	Kasipat Chograthin (THA)	56.60	56.78
9	Abdullah Al-Thuwaini (KUW)	56.70	
10	Johansen Aguilar (PHI)	56.75	
11	Trần Duy Khôi (VIE)	57.07	
12	Hoàng Quý Phước (VIE)	57.47	
13	Ayman Klzie (SYR)	58.33	
14	Aiman Al-Kulaibi (OMA)	58.94	
15	Antonio Tong (MAC)	1:00.71	
16	Wang Yu-lian (TPE)	1:01.02	
17	Fahad Al-Khaldi (PHI)	1:01.48	
18	Glenn Victor Sutanto (INA)	1:02.22	
19	Kent Cheung (HKG)	1:03.75	
20	Batsaikhany Mönkhbayar (MGL)	1:05.73	
21	Cholawa Phoduang (THA)	1:06.15	
22	Haseeb Tariq (PAK)	1:06.51	
23	Sereenendorjiin Ganduulga (MGL)	1:13.34	

==== 50 m breaststroke ====
1 July

Rank	Athlete	Heats	Final
1st place, gold medalist(s)	Ju Jang-hun (KOR)	27.70	27.43
2nd place, silver medalist(s)	Roman Trussov (KAZ)	27.41	27.69
3rd place, bronze medalist(s)	Shin Hyeong-keun (KOR)	27.84	27.75
4	Xue Jiajia (CHN)	28.01	27.86
5	Wong Chun Yan (HKG)	28.56	28.30
6	Yevgeniy Ryzhkov (KAZ)	28.51	28.37
7	Ronald Tsui (HKG)	28.62	28.80
DQ	Indra Gunawan (INA)	~~27.34~~	~~27.29~~
9	Mubarak Mohamed Al-Besher (UAE)	28.64	
10	Amir Mohammad Shojaeifar (IRI)	28.69	
11	Sittivech Kongsomrerk (THA)	28.70	
12	Chao Man Hou (MAC)	28.75	
13	Chiang Hsin-hung (TPE)	28.77	
14	Chou Kit (MAC)	28.80	
15	Dmitri Aleksandrov (KGZ)	28.86	
16	Vasilii Danilov (KGZ)	28.90	
17	Abdulrahman Al-Bader (KUW)	28.98	
18	Nicko Biondi (INA)	29.06	
19	Radomyos Matjiur (THA)	29.31	
20	Ahmad Al-Bader (KUW)	29.74	
21	Trần Duy Khôi (VIE)	29.89	
22	Sereenendorjiin Ganduulga (MGL)	39.61	
—	Mohammed Abdo (PLE)	DNS	
—	Ebrahim Al-Kebsi (YEM)	DNS	

- Indra Gunawan of Indonesia originally won the gold medal, but was disqualified after he tested positive for Methylhexanamine.

==== 100 m breaststroke ====
30 June

Rank	Athlete	Heats	Final
1st place, gold medalist(s)	Ju Jang-hun (KOR)	1:00.50	59.28
2nd place, silver medalist(s)	Choi Kyu-woong (KOR)	1:00.73	59.75
3rd place, bronze medalist(s)	Roman Trussov (KAZ)	1:00.31	59.95
4	Yevgeniy Ryzhkov (KAZ)	1:01.39	1:00.23
5	Xue Jiajia (CHN)	1:01.22	1:00.40
6	Chiang Hsin-hung (TPE)	1:01.43	1:01.28
7	Ronald Tsui (HKG)	1:01.54	1:01.41
DQ	Indra Gunawan (INA)	~~1:01.09~~	~~1:00.84~~
9	Abdulrahman Al-Bader (KUW)	1:01.60	
10	Chou Kit (MAC)	1:01.90	
11	Chao Man Hou (MAC)	1:02.13	
12	Sittivech Kongsomrerk (THA)	1:02.26	
13	Ahmad Al-Bader (KUW)	1:02.47	
14	Dmitri Aleksandrov (KGZ)	1:02.79	
15	Wong Chun Yan (HKG)	1:02.83	
16	Amir Mohammad Shojaeifar (IRI)	1:02.87	
17	Mubarak Mohamed Al-Besher (UAE)	1:03.07	
18	Dennis Josua Tiwa (INA)	1:03.09	
19	Mohammed Al-Shafee (UAE)	1:04.63	
20	Radomyos Matjiur (THA)	1:05.37	
21	Jessie Lacuna (PHI)	1:07.33	
22	Franz Marquez (PHI)	1:08.73	
23	Trần Duy Khôi (VIE)	1:09.49	

- Indra Gunawan of Indonesia originally finished 6th, but was disqualified after he tested positive for Methylhexanamine.

==== 50 m butterfly ====
2 July

Rank	Athlete	Heats	Final
1st place, gold medalist(s)	Yang Jung-doo (KOR)	23.19	23.15
2nd place, silver medalist(s)	Chang Gyu-cheol (KOR)	24.12	23.76
3rd place, bronze medalist(s)	Glenn Victor Sutanto (INA)	24.41	23.81
4	Hoàng Quý Phước (VIE)	24.76	24.19
5	Alexandr Tarabrin (KAZ)	24.76	24.25
6	Xu Zhijie (CHN)	24.61	24.28
7	Chang Kuo-chi (TPE)	24.76	24.37
8	Stanislav Kuzmin (KAZ)	24.64	24.71
9	Chatmongkon Noiaree (THA)	24.88	
10	Abbas Qali (KUW)	24.89	
11	Derick Ng (HKG)	24.97	
12	Hsu Chi-chieh (TPE)	25.03	
13	Supakrid Pananuratana (THA)	25.09	
14	Shi Ji (CHN)	25.35	
15	Kwong Ka Ho (HKG)	25.47	
16	Ahmad Reza Jalali (IRI)	25.74	
17	Nawaf Al-Qasmi (OMA)	26.20	
18	Batsaikhany Dölgöön (MGL)	26.38	
19	Chong Cheok Kuan (MAC)	26.56	
20	Wong Pok Iao (MAC)	26.62	
21	Sergeý Krowýakow (TKM)	27.09	
22	Atajan Annadurdyýew (TKM)	27.91	
23	Maximov Chamraen Youri (CAM)	28.88	
24	Mohamed Muthasim Adnan (MDV)	29.85	
25	Yousef Al-Nehmi (YEM)	30.88	
26	Sereenendorjiin Ganduulga (MGL)	31.85	
—	Afshin Asgari (IRI)	DSQ	
DQ	Guntur Pratama Putera (INA)	~~24.93~~	

- Guntur Pratama Putera of Indonesia originally finished 11th, but was disqualified after he tested positive for Methylhexanamine.

==== 100 m butterfly ====
1 July

Rank	Athlete	Heats	Final
1st place, gold medalist(s)	Chang Gyu-cheol (KOR)	53.94	51.56
2nd place, silver medalist(s)	Glenn Victor Sutanto (INA)	53.25	51.82
3rd place, bronze medalist(s)	Hoàng Quý Phước (VIE)	53.39	52.68
4	Yousef Al-Askari (KUW)	53.53	53.10
5	Xu Zhijie (CHN)	53.33	53.35
6	Hsu Chi-chieh (TPE)	54.12	53.81
7	Stanislav Kuzmin (KAZ)	54.30	54.70
—	Supakrid Pananuratana (THA)	54.49	DSQ
9	Triady Fauzi Sidiq (INA)	54.47	
10	Chatmongkon Noiaree (THA)	54.62	
11	Ayman Klzie (SYR)	54.99	
12	Kwong Ka Ho (HKG)	55.09	
13	Abbas Qali (KUW)	55.14	
14	Jessie Lacuna (PHI)	55.49	
15	Shi Ji (CHN)	55.50	
16	Ahmad Reza Jalali (IRI)	55.88	
17	Derick Ng (HKG)	56.20	
18	Matthew Abeysinghe (SRI)	57.19	
19	Obaid Al-Jasmi (UAE)	57.71	
20	Afshin Asgari (IRI)	58.07	
21	Batsaikhany Dölgöön (MGL)	58.49	
22	Chong Cheok Kuan (MAC)	58.50	
23	Franz Marquez (PHI)	59.97	
24	Yang Jung-doo (KOR)	1:00.39	
25	Nawaf Al-Qasmi (OMA)	1:00.48	
26	Anderson Lim (BRU)	1:00.51	
27	Lei Cheok Fong (MAC)	1:03.34	
28	Ghulam Muhammad (PAK)	1:05.52	

==== 100 m individual medley ====
3 July

Rank	Athlete	Heats	Final
1st place, gold medalist(s)	Sun Xiaolei (CHN)	56.43	53.72
2nd place, silver medalist(s)	Radomyos Matjiur (THA)	56.71	54.87
3rd place, bronze medalist(s)	Dmitriy Gordiyenko (KAZ)	55.61	55.32
4	Liu Junwu (CHN)	55.67	55.47
5	Trần Duy Khôi (VIE)	57.02	56.32
6	Vasilii Danilov (KGZ)	56.77	56.46
7	Supakrid Pananuratana (THA)	57.02	56.97
—	Glenn Victor Sutanto (INA)	56.37	DNS
9	Derick Ng (HKG)	57.04	
9	Hsu Chi-chieh (TPE)	57.04	
11	Im Tae-jeong (KOR)	57.22	
12	Chou Kit (MAC)	57.35	
13	Hoàng Quý Phước (VIE)	57.50	
14	Ahmad Reza Jalali (IRI)	57.58	
15	Chiang Hsin-hung (TPE)	57.91	
16	I Gede Siman Sudartawa (INA)	57.99	
17	Kwong Ka Ho (HKG)	58.06	
18	Ayman Klzie (SYR)	58.20	
19	Abdulrahman Al-Bader (KUW)	58.24	
20	Amir Mohammad Shojaeifar (IRI)	58.33	
21	Abbas Qali (KUW)	58.96	
22	Obaid Al-Jasmi (UAE)	59.33	
23	Atajan Annadurdyýew (TKM)	1:07.38	
24	Mohamed Muthasim Adnan (MDV)	1:11.64	
25	Sereenendorjiin Ganduulga (MGL)	1:13.42	

==== 200 m individual medley ====
30 June

Rank	Athlete	Heats	Final
1st place, gold medalist(s)	Mao Feilian (CHN)	2:01.62	1:56.61
2nd place, silver medalist(s)	Trần Duy Khôi (VIE)	2:02.74	2:00.24
3rd place, bronze medalist(s)	Choi Kyu-woong (KOR)	2:02.51	2:00.35
4	Dmitriy Gordiyenko (KAZ)	2:02.14	2:00.74
5	Im Tae-jeong (KOR)	2:02.93	2:01.97
6	Vasilii Danilov (KGZ)	2:03.44	2:02.53
7	Radomyos Matjiur (THA)	2:03.30	2:02.70
8	Yousef Al-Askari (KUW)	2:02.51	2:05.06
9	Jessie Lacuna (PHI)	2:04.44	
10	Hsu Chi-chieh (TPE)	2:04.69	
11	Jiarapong Sangkhawat (THA)	2:04.84	
12	David Wong (HKG)	2:04.86	
13	Ayman Klzie (SYR)	2:05.20	
14	Ahmad Reza Jalali (IRI)	2:05.36	
15	Derick Ng (HKG)	2:05.40	
16	Rodrick Luhur (INA)	2:06.15	
17	Aleksandr Slepchenko (KGZ)	2:07.21	
18	Matthew Abeysinghe (SRI)	2:07.61	
19	Shi Ji (CHN)	2:08.70	
20	Franz Marquez (PHI)	2:11.97	
21	Aiman Al-Kulaibi (OMA)	2:15.25	
22	Ali Al-Kaabi (UAE)	2:15.34	
23	Ghulam Muhammad (PAK)	2:31.07	
—	Glenn Victor Sutanto (INA)	DNS	

==== 4 × 50 m freestyle relay ====
2 July

Rank	Team	Heats	Final
1st place, gold medalist(s)	China (CHN)	1:30.69	1:28.64
2nd place, silver medalist(s)	Kazakhstan (KAZ)	1:29.80	1:29.10
3rd place, bronze medalist(s)	South Korea (KOR)	1:31.40	1:30.08
4	Hong Kong (HKG)	1:32.12	1:30.44
5	Iran (IRI)	1:33.02	1:31.29
6	Kuwait (KUW)	1:32.44	1:31.91
7	Thailand (THA)	1:31.74	1:32.00
DQ	Indonesia (INA)	~~1:31.30~~	~~1:29.01~~
9	Chinese Taipei (TPE)	1:33.17	
10	Macau (MAC)	1:33.91	
11	Kyrgyzstan (KGZ)	1:34.46	
12	Philippines (PHI)	1:36.43	
13	United Arab Emirates (UAE)	1:36.48	
—	Pakistan (PAK)	DNS	

- Indonesia originally won the silver medal, but was disqualified after Guntur Pratama Putera tested positive for Methylhexanamine.

==== 4 × 100 m freestyle relay ====
1 July

Rank	Team	Heats	Final
1st place, gold medalist(s)	China (CHN)	3:20.89	3:15.74
2nd place, silver medalist(s)	Hong Kong (HKG)	3:22.08	3:18.62
3rd place, bronze medalist(s)	South Korea (KOR)	3:23.13	3:19.48
4	Kuwait (KUW)	3:22.24	3:19.52
5	Thailand (THA)	3:22.83	3:22.32
6	Iran (IRI)	3:25.93	3:23.55
—	Kazakhstan (KAZ)	3:22.03	DSQ
DQ	Indonesia (INA)	~~3:23.08~~	~~3:19.10~~
9	Philippines (PHI)	3:28.76	
10	Macau (MAC)	3:29.03	
11	Chinese Taipei (TPE)	3:30.36	
12	United Arab Emirates (UAE)	3:32.71	
—	Kyrgyzstan (KGZ)	DSQ	
—	Pakistan (PAK)	DNS	

- Indonesia originally won the bronze medal, but was disqualified after Guntur Pratama Putera tested positive for Methylhexanamine.

==== 4 × 50 m medley relay ====
30 June

Rank	Team	Heats	Final
1st place, gold medalist(s)	China (CHN)	1:39.17	1:36.00
2nd place, silver medalist(s)	South Korea (KOR)	1:38.97	1:36.38
3rd place, bronze medalist(s)	Kazakhstan (KAZ)	1:41.06	1:36.55
4	Thailand (THA)	1:40.58	1:40.09
5	Chinese Taipei (TPE)	1:42.23	1:40.35
6	Hong Kong (HKG)	1:41.26	1:40.40
7	Kuwait (KUW)	1:41.27	1:40.60
DQ	Indonesia (INA)	~~1:38.88~~	~~1:36.60~~
9	Iran (IRI)	1:43.01	
10	Macau (MAC)	1:45.68	
11	United Arab Emirates (UAE)	1:46.11	
12	Kyrgyzstan (KGZ)	1:47.42	
—	Pakistan (PAK)	DNS	

- Indonesia originally finished 4th, but was disqualified after Indra Gunawan tested positive for Methylhexanamine.

==== 4 × 100 m medley relay ====
3 July

Rank	Team	Heats	Final
1st place, gold medalist(s)	China (CHN)	3:43.46	3:30.20
2nd place, silver medalist(s)	South Korea (KOR)	3:45.26	3:31.65
3rd place, bronze medalist(s)	Kazakhstan (KAZ)	3:39.94	3:34.11
4	Chinese Taipei (TPE)	3:47.82	3:40.11
5	Hong Kong (HKG)	3:42.85	3:40.47
6	Kuwait (KUW)	3:46.82	3:42.62
7	Thailand (THA)	3:45.94	3:42.94
DQ	Indonesia (INA)	~~3:40.14~~	~~DSQ~~
9	Iran (IRI)	3:48.01	
10	Philippines (PHI)	3:52.21	
11	Macau (MAC)	3:53.55	
12	Kyrgyzstan (KGZ)	3:54.79	
13	United Arab Emirates (UAE)	4:01.04	
—	Pakistan (PAK)	DNS	

- Indonesia disqualified after Indra Gunawan tested positive for Methylhexanamine.

=== Women ===
==== 50 m freestyle ====
30 June

Rank	Athlete	Heats	Final
1st place, gold medalist(s)	Jenjira Srisa-ard (THA)	25.70	25.21
2nd place, silver medalist(s)	Sze Hang Yu (HKG)	25.40	25.22
3rd place, bronze medalist(s)	Elmira Aigaliyeva (KAZ)	25.30	25.23
4	Natthanan Junkrajang (THA)	25.62	25.27
5	Lei On Kei (MAC)	26.08	25.82
6	Yang Chin-kuei (TPE)	25.98	25.85
7	Nguyễn Thị Kim Tuyến (VIE)	26.43	26.15
8	Wang Siqi (CHN)	26.42	26.17
9	Faye Sultan (KUW)	26.56	
10	Patricia Yosita Hapsari (INA)	26.62	
11	Chen Xiaojun (CHN)	26.82	
12	Enny Susilawati Margono (INA)	26.99	
13	Machiko Raheem (SRI)	27.02	
13	Yu Wai Ting (HKG)	27.02	
15	Yekaterina Russova (KAZ)	27.18	
16	Sabine Hazboun (PLE)	28.01	
17	Teng Yu-chieh (TPE)	28.07	
17	Choi Weng Tong (MAC)	28.07	
19	Nguyễn Thị Ngọc Yến (VIE)	28.29	
20	Sameera Al-Bitar (BRN)	28.83	
21	Merjen Saryýewa (TKM)	29.62	
22	Bavuudorjiin Ariunzul (MGL)	30.14	
23	Deliýa Saryýewa (TKM)	30.41	
24	Nada Arkaji (QAT)	30.85	
25	Rida Mitha (PAK)	31.15	
26	Aminath Shajan (MDV)	31.55	
27	Shreya Dhital (NEP)	32.53	
28	Batbayaryn Enkhkhüslen (MGL)	33.23	
29	Nen Somaly (CAM)	37.49	
—	Bayan Jumah (SYR)	DNS	

==== 100 m freestyle ====
3 July

Rank	Athlete	Heats	Final
1st place, gold medalist(s)	Elmira Aigaliyeva (KAZ)	56.50	54.79
2nd place, silver medalist(s)	Yang Chin-kuei (TPE)	57.45	54.89
3rd place, bronze medalist(s)	Natthanan Junkrajang (THA)	56.50	54.92
4	Wang Fei (CHN)	56.43	55.07
5	Sze Hang Yu (HKG)	55.87	55.22
6	Bayan Jumah (SYR)	57.28	56.87
7	Nguyễn Thị Ánh Viên (VIE)	57.73	57.00
8	Faye Sultan (KUW)	57.52	57.32
9	Hannah Dato (PHI)	57.91	
10	Patricia Yosita Hapsari (INA)	58.03	
11	Ren Luomeng (CHN)	58.95	
12	Jenjira Srisa-ard (THA)	59.28	
13	Yekaterina Russova (KAZ)	59.50	
14	Yu Wai Ting (HKG)	59.78	
15	Enny Susilawati Margono (INA)	59.80	
16	Erica Vong (MAC)	59.99	
17	Nguyễn Thị Kim Tuyến (VIE)	1:00.59	
18	Choi Weng Tong (MAC)	1:01.26	
19	Sabine Hazboun (PLE)	1:01.29	
20	Bavuudorjiin Ariunzul (MGL)	1:04.79	
21	Merjen Saryýewa (TKM)	1:05.37	
22	Lkhagvaagiin Anudari (MGL)	1:08.28	
23	Aminath Shajan (MDV)	1:09.63	
24	Shreya Dhital (NEP)	1:10.64	
25	Rida Mitha (PAK)	1:10.85	

==== 200 m freestyle ====
2 July

Rank	Athlete	Heats	Final
1st place, gold medalist(s)	Wang Fei (CHN)	2:02.21	1:57.19
2nd place, silver medalist(s)	Yang Chin-kuei (TPE)	2:02.74	1:57.51
3rd place, bronze medalist(s)	Natthanan Junkrajang (THA)	2:00.99	1:58.25
4	Nguyễn Thị Ánh Viên (VIE)	2:00.62	1:58.52
5	Ren Luomeng (CHN)	2:03.05	2:00.69
6	Patarawadee Kittiya (THA)	2:03.55	2:03.15
7	Hannah Dato (PHI)	2:03.60	2:03.86
8	Bayan Jumah (SYR)	2:04.86	2:04.73
9	Raina Ramdhani (INA)	2:07.89	
10	Nguyễn Thị Ngọc Yến (VIE)	2:08.27	
11	Machiko Raheem (SRI)	2:08.48	
12	Patricia Yosita Hapsari (INA)	2:09.23	
13	Sameera Al-Bitar (BRN)	2:16.27	
14	Aminath Shajan (MDV)	2:33.94	
—	Sze Hang Yu (HKG)	DSQ	
—	Chan Kin Lok (HKG)	DSQ	

==== 50 m backstroke ====
1 July

Rank	Athlete	Heats	Final
1st place, gold medalist(s)	Zhou Yanxin (CHN)	27.65	27.24
2nd place, silver medalist(s)	Stephanie Au (HKG)	27.98	27.33
3rd place, bronze medalist(s)	Yekaterina Rudenko (KAZ)	28.12	27.54
4	Kim Ji-hyun (KOR)	28.33	27.75
5	Natthanan Junkrajang (THA)	28.23	27.76
6	Nguyễn Thị Ánh Viên (VIE)	29.14	28.79
7	Araya Wongvat (THA)	29.11	29.04
8	Yu Yi-chen (TPE)	29.71	29.53
9	Erica Vong (MAC)	29.77	
10	Ressa Kania Dewi (INA)	29.81	
11	Faye Sultan (KUW)	29.95	
12	Teng Yu-chieh (TPE)	30.29	
13	Yessy Yosaputra (INA)	30.68	
14	Kuan Weng I (MAC)	30.71	
15	Altansükhiin Nomin (MGL)	34.83	
16	Rida Mitha (PAK)	36.50	
17	Deliýa Saryýewa (TKM)	36.91	
18	Nada Arkaji (QAT)	37.11	
19	Batbayaryn Enkhkhüslen (MGL)	41.04	
—	Sabine Hazboun (PLE)	DNS	

==== 100 m backstroke ====
2 July

Rank	Athlete	Heats	Final
1st place, gold medalist(s)	Zhou Yanxin (CHN)	1:00.23	57.96
2nd place, silver medalist(s)	Yekaterina Rudenko (KAZ)	1:00.31	59.01
3rd place, bronze medalist(s)	Stephanie Au (HKG)	1:01.74	59.22
4	Kim Ji-hyun (KOR)	1:01.99	1:00.22
5	Nguyễn Thị Ánh Viên (VIE)	1:01.93	1:01.35
6	Araya Wongvat (THA)	1:02.40	1:02.98
7	Yessy Yosaputra (INA)	1:03.83	1:03.82
8	Teng Yu-chieh (TPE)	1:04.10	1:04.98
9	Erica Vong (MAC)	1:04.74	
10	Nurul Fajar Fitriyati (INA)	1:05.22	
11	Kuan Weng I (MAC)	1:07.41	
12	Yu Yi-chen (TPE)	1:07.75	
13	Nichapat Kaewpongmongkol (THA)	1:07.76	
14	Altansükhiin Nomin (MGL)	1:17.29	

==== 50 m breaststroke ====
3 July

Rank	Athlete	Heats	Final
1st place, gold medalist(s)	Kim Go-eun (KOR)	31.72	31.01
2nd place, silver medalist(s)	Back Su-yeon (KOR)	31.50	31.46
3rd place, bronze medalist(s)	Chen I-chuan (TPE)	32.64	31.76
4	Yvette Kong (HKG)	32.37	32.06
5	Fan Rong (CHN)	32.57	32.19
6	Liu Siwen (CHN)	32.78	32.55
7	Dariya Talanova (KGZ)	32.21	32.60
8	Chavunnooch Salubluek (THA)	33.05	34.19
9	Lei On Kei (MAC)	33.44	
10	Margareta Kretapradani (INA)	33.61	
11	Ngô Thị Ngọc Quỳnh (VIE)	34.47	
12	Enny Susilawati Margono (INA)	34.61	
13	Benjaporn Sriphanomthorn (THA)	34.86	
14	Altansükhiin Nomin (MGL)	36.75	
15	Batbayaryn Enkhkhüslen (MGL)	44.05	
16	Sarah Tajammul Hussain (PAK)	44.75	
—	Aizada Zhussupova (KAZ)	DSQ	
—	Sabine Hazboun (PLE)	DNS	

==== 100 m breaststroke ====
30 June

Rank	Athlete	Heats	Final
1st place, gold medalist(s)	Back Su-yeon (KOR)	1:08.93	1:06.34
2nd place, silver medalist(s)	Kim Go-eun (KOR)	1:07.98	1:07.30
3rd place, bronze medalist(s)	Chen I-chuan (TPE)	1:09.50	1:08.39
4	Fan Rong (CHN)	1:09.87	1:08.42
5	Yvette Kong (HKG)	1:09.71	1:09.20
6	Liu Siwen (CHN)	1:09.46	1:09.46
7	Chavunnooch Salubluek (THA)	1:11.11	1:10.00
8	Dariya Talanova (KGZ)	1:10.27	1:11.43
9	Margareta Kretapradani (INA)	1:12.50	
10	Aizada Zhussupova (KAZ)	1:12.85	
11	Lei On Kei (MAC)	1:13.65	
12	Ngô Thị Ngọc Quỳnh (VIE)	1:14.09	
13	Patricia Yosita Hapsari (INA)	1:15.48	
14	Bayan Jumah (SYR)	1:16.95	
15	Pusanisa Sangplong (THA)	1:17.70	
16	Altansükhiin Nomin (MGL)	1:21.39	
17	Sarah Tajammul Hussain (PAK)	1:40.60	

==== 50 m butterfly ====
2 July

Rank	Athlete	Heats	Final
1st place, gold medalist(s)	Hwang Seo-jin (KOR)	26.97	26.79
2nd place, silver medalist(s)	Yang Chin-kuei (TPE)	27.44	26.94
2nd place, silver medalist(s)	Park Jin-young (KOR)	27.20	26.94
4	Sze Hang Yu (HKG)	27.13	26.99
5	Elmira Aigaliyeva (KAZ)	27.29	27.09
6	Jenjira Srisa-ard (THA)	27.45	27.22
7	Gong Jie (CHN)	28.02	27.54
8	Chan Kin Lok (HKG)	27.64	27.76
9	Nguyễn Thị Kim Tuyến (VIE)	28.36	
10	Yu Yi-chen (TPE)	28.46	
11	Tan Chi Yan (MAC)	28.81	
12	Ressa Kania Dewi (INA)	29.02	
13	Patricia Yosita Hapsari (INA)	29.05	
14	Pusanisa Sangplong (THA)	29.46	
15	Wang Siqi (CHN)	29.93	
16	Sabine Hazboun (PLE)	30.22	
17	Diana Al-Zamel (SYR)	30.93	
18	Davaadorjiin Zoljargal (MGL)	31.33	
19	Bavuudorjiin Ariunzul (MGL)	31.56	
20	Merjen Saryýewa (TKM)	32.43	
21	Shreya Dhital (NEP)	34.53	
22	Aminath Shajan (MDV)	34.66	
23	Rida Mitha (PAK)	35.11	

==== 100 m butterfly ====
1 July

Rank	Athlete	Heats	Final
1st place, gold medalist(s)	Elmira Aigaliyeva (KAZ)	59.60	58.40
2nd place, silver medalist(s)	Park Jin-young (KOR)	1:00.74	58.95
3rd place, bronze medalist(s)	Sze Hang Yu (HKG)	59.69	59.11
4	Gong Jie (CHN)	1:00.89	59.59
5	Hwang Seo-jin (KOR)	1:00.67	59.96
6	Chan Kin Lok (HKG)	1:01.55	1:00.83
7	Patarawadee Kittiya (THA)	1:01.18	1:00.89
8	Nguyễn Thị Kim Tuyến (VIE)	1:01.66	1:00.92
9	Hannah Dato (PHI)	1:02.53	
10	Ressa Kania Dewi (INA)	1:03.52	
11	Monalisa Arieswati (INA)	1:03.79	
12	Diana Al-Zamel (SYR)	1:08.71	
13	Yu Yi-chen (TPE)	1:08.72	
14	Davaadorjiin Zoljargal (MGL)	1:10.64	
15	Bavuudorjiin Ariunzul (MGL)	1:20.33	

==== 100 m individual medley ====
3 July

Rank	Athlete	Heats	Final
1st place, gold medalist(s)	Zhou Yanxin (CHN)	1:04.07	1:01.24
2nd place, silver medalist(s)	Elmira Aigaliyeva (KAZ)	1:02.94	1:01.29
3rd place, bronze medalist(s)	Sze Hang Yu (HKG)	1:03.07	1:01.60
4	Nguyễn Thị Ánh Viên (VIE)	1:03.43	1:02.47
5	Nguyễn Thị Kim Tuyến (VIE)	1:03.95	1:02.84
6	Chan Kin Lok (HKG)	1:04.15	1:03.17
7	Ressa Kania Dewi (INA)	1:04.31	1:04.42
8	Patricia Yosita Hapsari (INA)	1:04.93	1:04.94
9	Benjaporn Sriphanomthorn (THA)	1:05.30	
10	Natthanan Junkrajang (THA)	1:06.32	
11	Chen Xiaojun (CHN)	1:06.81	
12	Tan Chi Yan (MAC)	1:06.97	
13	Machiko Raheem (SRI)	1:07.32	
14	Chen I-chuan (TPE)	1:09.75	
15	Diana Al-Zamel (SYR)	1:10.83	
16	Lkhagvaagiin Anudari (MGL)	1:18.16	
17	Batbayaryn Enkhkhüslen (MGL)	1:22.41	

==== 200 m individual medley ====
30 June

Rank	Athlete	Heats	Final
1st place, gold medalist(s)	Nguyễn Thị Ánh Viên (VIE)	2:14.10	2:10.05
2nd place, silver medalist(s)	Zhou Yanxin (CHN)	2:15.76	2:10.36
3rd place, bronze medalist(s)	Natthanan Junkrajang (THA)	2:17.20	2:14.08
4	Chan Kin Lok (HKG)	2:17.06	2:14.75
5	Benjaporn Sriphanomthorn (THA)	2:18.54	2:16.04
6	Chen Xiaojun (CHN)	2:18.16	2:17.40
7	Ressa Kania Dewi (INA)	2:18.74	2:18.79
8	Hannah Dato (PHI)	2:20.27	2:20.22
9	Wong Yee Ching (HKG)	2:21.06	
10	Tan Chi Yan (MAC)	2:23.89	
11	Nguyễn Thị Ngọc Yến (VIE)	2:24.77	
12	Patricia Yosita Hapsari (INA)	2:24.89	
13	Machiko Raheem (SRI)	2:27.13	
14	Diana Al-Zamel (SYR)	2:32.51	
15	Bavuudorjiin Ariunzul (MGL)	2:54.03	
—	Davaadorjiin Zoljargal (MGL)	DSQ	

==== 4 × 50 m freestyle relay ====
2 July

Rank	Team	Heats	Final
1st place, gold medalist(s)	Thailand (THA)	1:44.53	1:41.83
2nd place, silver medalist(s)	China (CHN)	1:47.42	1:42.62
3rd place, bronze medalist(s)	South Korea (KOR)	1:45.48	1:42.83
3rd place, bronze medalist(s)	Hong Kong (HKG)	1:45.67	1:42.83
5	Kazakhstan (KAZ)	1:45.23	1:43.60
6	Indonesia (INA)	1:48.54	1:45.72
7	Chinese Taipei (TPE)	1:50.78	1:47.47
8	Macau (MAC)	1:49.77	1:47.54
9	Mongolia (MGL)	2:01.32	
—	Pakistan (PAK)	DNS	

==== 4 × 100 m freestyle relay ====
1 July

Rank	Team	Heats	Final
1st place, gold medalist(s)	China (CHN)	3:50.08	3:41.63
2nd place, silver medalist(s)	Thailand (THA)	3:51.62	3:42.96
3rd place, bronze medalist(s)	Hong Kong (HKG)	3:52.59	3:43.47
4	South Korea (KOR)	3:51.31	3:44.75
5	Indonesia (INA)	3:56.22	3:50.15
6	Chinese Taipei (TPE)	4:01.01	3:53.36
7	Macau (MAC)	4:01.98	3:55.16
—	Mongolia (MGL)	4:32.51	DNS
—	Kazakhstan (KAZ)	DSQ	
—	Pakistan (PAK)	DNS	

==== 4 × 50 m medley relay ====
30 June

Rank	Team	Heats	Final
1st place, gold medalist(s)	South Korea (KOR)	1:51.89	1:50.17
2nd place, silver medalist(s)	China (CHN)	1:53.07	1:51.72
3rd place, bronze medalist(s)	Hong Kong (HKG)	1:54.00	1:51.75
4	Thailand (THA)	1:54.80	1:52.45
5	Kazakhstan (KAZ)	1:53.69	1:52.83
6	Chinese Taipei (TPE)	1:58.81	1:55.75
7	Indonesia (INA)	1:58.72	1:56.93
8	Macau (MAC)	2:00.96	1:59.36
9	Mongolia (MGL)	2:19.16	
—	Pakistan (PAK)	DNS	

==== 4 × 100 m medley relay ====
3 July

Rank	Team	Heats	Final
1st place, gold medalist(s)	China (CHN)	4:10.51	3:58.31
2nd place, silver medalist(s)	South Korea (KOR)	4:11.77	3:59.82
3rd place, bronze medalist(s)	Hong Kong (HKG)	4:13.29	4:00.77
4	Thailand (THA)	4:15.70	4:06.37
5	Kazakhstan (KAZ)	4:17.92	4:07.88
6	Chinese Taipei (TPE)	4:35.13	4:16.82
7	Indonesia (INA)	4:19.45	4:18.26
8	Macau (MAC)	4:29.02	4:24.27
9	Mongolia (MGL)	5:07.04	
—	Pakistan (PAK)	DNS	
