= Swimming at the 2014 Asian Games – Men's 50 metre freestyle =

Men's 50 metre freestyle at the 2014 Asian Games
- Venue: Munhak Park Tae-hwan Aquatics Center
- Date: 23 September 2014
- Competitors: 42 from 28 nations

Medalists
gold medal	Ning Zetao	China
silver medal	Shinri Shioura	Japan
bronze medal	Kenta Ito	Japan

The men's 50 metre freestyle event at the 2014 Asian Games took place on 23 September 2014 at Munhak Park Tae-hwan Aquatics Center.

== Schedule ==
All times are Korea Standard Time (UTC+09:00)

Date	Time	Event
Tuesday, 23 September 2014	09:00	Heats
Tuesday, 23 September 2014	19:06	Final

== Records ==
Prior to this competition, the existing world, Asian and Games records were as follows.

World Record	César Cielo (BRA)	20.91	São Paulo, Brazil	18 December 2009
Asian Record	Shinri Shioura (JPN)	21.88	Tokyo, Japan	13 April 2014
Games Record	Lü Zhiwu (CHN)	22.37	Guangzhou, China	15 November 2010

== Results ==
=== Heats ===
Rank	Heat	Athlete	Time	Notes
1	6	Ning Zetao (CHN)	21.94	GR
2	6	Shinri Shioura (JPN)	22.09	
3	5	Yu Hexin (CHN)	22.32	
4	4	Kenta Ito (JPN)	22.64	
5	5	Yang Jung-doo (KOR)	22.65	
6	4	Geoffrey Cheah (HKG)	22.81	
7	4	Chang Kuo-chi (TPE)	23.08	
8	4	Jeremy Wong (HKG)	23.28	
9	5	Triady Fauzi Sidiq (INA)	23.31	
10	4	Clement Lim (SIN)	23.36	
11	6	Daniil Tulupov (UZB)	23.42	
12	5	Aleksey Derlyugov (UZB)	23.46	
13	6	Mohammad Madwa (KUW)	23.51	
14	6	Lin Chien-liang (TPE)	23.54	
15	5	Alwyn Tan (MAS)	23.55	
16	6	Darren Lim (SIN)	23.67	
17	5	Ahmad Reza Jalali (IRI)	23.74	
18	5	Glenn Victor Sutanto (INA)	23.75	
19	6	Arsham Mirzaei (IRI)	23.91	
20	4	Anshul Kothari (IND)	23.94	
21	5	Anthony Barbar (LIB)	23.95	
22	6	Lao Kuan Fong (MAC)	23.96	
23	4	Mohamed Al-Mheiri (UAE)	24.54	
24	4	Sooud Al-Tayyar (KUW)	24.68	
25	3	Wong Pok Iao (MAC)	24.79	
26	3	Sergeý Krowýakow (TKM)	24.96	
27	3	Batsaikhany Dölgöön (MGL)	25.03	
28	3	Myagmaryn Delgerkhüü (MGL)	25.26	
29	3	Mohammed Abdo (PLE)	26.03	
30	3	Muhammad Saad Amin (PAK)	26.20	
31	3	Hassan Al-Mubarak (KSA)	26.31	
32	2	Hoàng Quý Phước (VIE)	26.68	
33	2	Walid Dalloul (QAT)	26.91	
34	2	Nishwan Ibrahim (MDV)	27.08	
35	2	Sirish Gurung (NEP)	27.23	
36	1	Hem Thon Ponleu (CAM)	27.46	
37	2	Olim Kurbanov (TJK)	27.65	
38	2	Miraj Prajapati (NEP)	28.08	
39	1	Phathana Inthavong (LAO)	28.09	
40	3	Mohamed Muthasim Adnan (MDV)	28.15	
41	2	Radzhabmurod Kasymov (TJK)	28.29	
42	1	Yousef Al-Washali (YEM)	29.14	

=== Final ===
Rank	Athlete	Time	Notes
1st place, gold medalist(s)	Ning Zetao (CHN)	21.95	
2nd place, silver medalist(s)	Shinri Shioura (JPN)	22.11	
3rd place, bronze medalist(s)	Kenta Ito (JPN)	22.16	
4	Yu Hexin (CHN)	22.37	
5	Yang Jung-doo (KOR)	22.60	
6	Geoffrey Cheah (HKG)	22.91	
7	Chang Kuo-chi (TPE)	22.93	
8	Jeremy Wong (HKG)	23.11	
