= List of Kuwaiti records in swimming =

The records in swimming are the fastest ever performances of swimmers from Kuwait, which are recognised and ratified by the Kuwait Swimming Association (KSA).

All records were set in finals unless noted otherwise.

== Long Course (50 m) ==
=== Men ===
Event	Time		Name	Club	Date	Meet	Location	Ref
50 m freestyle	22.83	h	Mohammad Madwa	Kuwait	14 August 2008	Olympic Games	Beijing, China	
100 m freestyle	50.18		Abdullah Ali Thuwaini	Kuwait	8 December 2009	Gymnasiade	Doha, Qatar	
200 m freestyle	1:51.69		Yousef Alaskari	Kuwait	3 April 2015	Dubai International Championships	Dubai, United Arab Emirates	
400 m freestyle	3:59.26	h	Yousef Allowghani	Kuwait	25 August 2015	World Junior Championships	Singapore, Singapore	
800 m freestyle	8:15.47		Yousef Allowghani	Kuwait	27 August 2015	World Junior Championships	Singapore, Singapore	
1500 m freestyle	16:04.18		Nawaf Ali Al-Wazzan	Kuwait	30 July 2005	World Championships	Montreal, Canada	
1500 m freestyle	15:50.37	'#'	Yousef Allowghani	Kuwait	3 October 2015	Asian Age Group Championships	Bangkok, Thailand	
50 m backstroke	25.45		Ali Alzamil	Kuwait	16 August 2022	Islamic Solidarity Games	Konya, Turkey	
100 m backstroke	55.82		Abdullah Ali Thuwaini	Kuwait	9 December 2009	Gymnasiade	Doha, Qatar	
200 m backstroke	2:04.99		Abdullah Ali Thuwaini	Kuwait	4 July 2009	Asian Youth Games	Singapore, Singapore	
50 m breaststroke	28.01	h	Rashed Al-Tarmoom	Monterey Bay	4 December 2025	U.S. Open	Austin, United States	
100 m breaststroke	1:02.44		Rashed Al-Tarmoom	-	19 December 2025	Kuwaiti Championships	Kuwait City, Kuwait	
200 m breaststroke	2:16.30		Ahmad Albader	Kuwait	8 September 2014	2nd Arab Open Championships	Cairo, Morocco	
50 m butterfly	23.66		Waleed Abdulrazzaq	Kuwait	17 August 2022	Islamic Solidarity Games	Konya, Turkey	
100 m butterfly	53.28	tt	Abbas Qali	Azura Florida Aquatics	20 June 2021	International Meet Ravne	Ravne na Koroškem, Slovenia	
200 m butterfly	2:00.75		Yousef Al-Askari	-	December 2011	Pan Arab Games	Doha, Qatar	
200m individual medley	2:07.14	h	Khaled Alotaibi	Kuwait	20 September 2026	Asian Games	Tokyo, Japan	
400m individual medley	4:28.75	h	Khaled Alotaibi	Kuwait	22 September 2026	Asian Games	Tokyo, Japan	
4×100m freestyle relay	3:25.18		Abdullah Althuwaini; Yousef Al-Askari; Mohammad Madouh; Salman Qali	Kuwait	December 2011	Pan Arab Games	Doha, Qatar	
4×200m freestyle relay	7:34.68		Yousef Al-Askari; Mohammad Madouh; Abdullah Althuwaini; Sooud Altayyar	Kuwait	December 2011	Pan Arab Games	Doha, Qatar	
4×100m medley relay	3:47.42		Ali Alzamil (58.44); Rashed Al-Tarmoom (1:02.88); Waleed Abdulrazzaq (53.72); Sauod Alshamroukh (52.38)	Kuwait	17 August 2022	Islamic Solidarity Games	Konya, Turkey	

Legend: # – Record awaiting ratification by Kuwait Swimming Association; WR – World record; AS – Asian record;
Records not set in finals: h – heat; sf – semifinal; r – relay 1st leg; rh – relay heat 1st leg; b – B final; † – en route to final mark; so – swim-off; tt – time trial

=== Women ===
Event	Time		Name	Club	Date	Meet	Location	Ref
50m freestyle	26.48		Edith Lingmann	Kuwait	1 April 2015	12th Arab Swimming Age Group Championships	Dubai, United Arab Emirates	
100m freestyle	59.66	h	Faye Sultan	Kuwait	6 August 2015	World Championships	Kazan, Russia	
200 m freestyle								
400 m freestyle								
800 m freestyle								
1500 m freestyle								
50m backstroke	31.36	h	Faye Sultan	Kuwait	31 July 2013	World Championships	Barcelona, Spain	
100 m backstroke								
200 m backstroke								
50m breaststroke	35.44	h	Lara Dashti	Kuwait	29 July 2023	World Championships	Fukuoka, Japan	
100m breaststroke	1:13.33	h	Maria Filopoulou	Kuwait	2 April 2015	12th Arab Swimming Age Group Championships	Dubai, United Arab Emirates	
200 m breaststroke								
50 m butterfly								
100 m butterfly								
200 m butterfly								
200m individual medley	2:21.81		Maria Filopoulou	Kuwait	2 April 2015	12th Arab Swimming Age Group Championships	Dubai, United Arab Emirates	
400 m individual medley								
4×100 m freestyle relay								
4×200 m freestyle relay								
4×100 m medley relay								

Legend: # – Record awaiting ratification by Kuwait Swimming Association; WR – World record; AS – Asian record;
Records not set in finals: h – heat; sf – semifinal; r – relay 1st leg; rh – relay heat 1st leg; b – B final; † – en route to final mark; so – swim-off; tt – time trial

== Short Course (25 m) ==
=== Men ===
Event	Time		Name	Club	Date	Meet	Location	Ref
50m freestyle	22.46		Walid Abdelrazak	Kuwait	26 October 2021	Arab Championships	Abu Dhabi, United Arab Emirates	
100m freestyle	48.67		Walid Abdelrazak	Kuwait	27 October 2021	Arab Championships	Abu Dhabi, United Arab Emirates	
200m freestyle	1:48.57		Yousef Al-Askari	Kuwait	22 February 2009	GCC Championships	Dubai, United Arab Emirates	
400m freestyle	3:58.77		Jaafar Jassem Boland	Kuwait	20 February 2009	GCC Championships	Doha, Qatar	
800m freestyle	8:13.53		Jaafar Jassem Boland	Kuwait	21 February 2009	GCC Championships	Doha, Qatar	
1500m freestyle	15:41.80		Ali Buabas	Kuwait	4 February 2015	GCC Championships	Dubai, United Arab Emirates	
50m backstroke	25.06	h	Mohamad Zubaid	Kuwait	12 December 2024	World Championships	Budapest, Hungary	
100m backstroke	55.45		Abdullah Ali Thuwaini	Kuwait	24 February 2009	GCC Championships	Doha, Qatar	
200m backstroke	2:00.92	h	Abdullah Ali Thuwaini	Kuwait	19 December 2010	World Championships	Dubai, United Arab Emirates	
50m breaststroke	27.66	h	Rashed Al-Tarmoom	Kuwait	17 December 2022	World Championships	Melbourne, Australia	
100m breaststroke	1:00.22	h	Rashed Al-Tarmoom	Kuwait	14 December 2022	World Championships	Melbourne, Australia	
200m breaststroke	2:13.63	h	Ahmad Albader	Kuwait	5 December 2014	World Championships	Doha, Qatar	
50m butterfly	23.52		Walid Abdelrazak	Kuwait	25 October 2021	Arab Championships	Abu Dhabi, United Arab Emirates	
100m butterfly	52.31		Walid Abdelrazak	Kuwait	24 October 2021	Arab Championships	Abu Dhabi, United Arab Emirates	
200m butterfly	1:57.03		Yousef Al-Askari	Kuwait	February 2015	12th GCC Championships	Dubai, United Arab Emirates	
100m individual medley	56.36		Waleed Abdulrazzaq	Kuwait Sea Sport Club	24 November 2024	Speedo Invitational Meet	Dubai, United Arab Emirates	
200m individual medley	2:02.51	h	Yousef Al-Askari	Kuwait	30 June 2013	Asian Indoor and Martial Arts Games	Incheon, South Korea	
400m individual medley	4:30.58		Marzoug Al-Salem	Kuwait	22 February 2009	GCC Championships	Doha, Qatar	
4×50m freestyle relay	1:31.91		Qali Abbas (23.43); Madouh Mohammed; Mohammad Ahmad; Alaskari Yousef	Kuwait	2 July 2013	Asian Indoor and Martial Arts Games	Incheon, South Korea	
4×100m freestyle relay	3:19.52			Kuwait	1 July 2013	Asian Indoor and Martial Arts Games	Incheon, South Korea	
4×200m freestyle relay	7:37.66	h	Yousef Al-Askari (1:54.77); Abdullah Altuwaini (1:50.73); Mohammed Madouh (1:55.98); Sauod Altayar (1:56.18)	Kuwait	16 December 2010	World Championships	Dubai, United Arab Emirates	
4×50m medley relay	1:40.60		Althuwaini Abdullah (25.85); Albader Abdulrahman; Qali Abbas; Madouh Mohammed	Kuwait	30 June 2013	Asian Indoor and Martial Arts Games	Incheon, South Korea	
4×100m medley relay	3:42.62		Althuwaini Abdullah (57.22); Albader Abdulrahman; Alaskari Yousef; Qali Abbas	Kuwait	3 July 2013	Asian Indoor and Martial Arts Games	Incheon, South Korea	

Legend: # – Record awaiting ratification by Kuwait Swimming Association; WR – World record; AS – Asian record;
Records not set in finals: h – heat; sf – semifinal; r – relay 1st leg; rh – relay heat 1st leg; b – B final; † – en route to final mark; so – swim-off; tt – time trial

=== Women ===
Event	Time		Name	Club	Date	Meet	Location	Ref
50 m freestyle	26.56	h	Faye Sultan	Kuwait	30 June 2013	Asian Indoor and Martial Arts Games	Incheon, South Korea	
100 m freestyle	57.32		Faye Sultan	Kuwait	3 July 2013	Asian Indoor and Martial Arts Games	Incheon, South Korea	
200 m freestyle								
400 m freestyle								
800 m freestyle								
1500 m freestyle								
50 m backstroke	29.95	h	Faye Sultan	Kuwait	1 Juli 2013	Asian Indoor and Martial Arts Games	Incheon, South Korea	
100 m backstroke								
200 m backstroke								
50 m breaststroke								
100 m breaststroke								
200 m breaststroke								
50 m butterfly								
100 m butterfly								
200 m butterfly								
200 m individual medley								
400 m individual medley								
4×100 m freestyle relay								
4×200 m freestyle relay								
4×100 m medley relay								

Legend: # – Record awaiting ratification by Kuwait Swimming Association; WR – World record; AS – Asian record;
Records not set in finals: h – heat; sf – semifinal; r – relay 1st leg; rh – relay heat 1st leg; b – B final; † – en route to final mark; so – swim-off; tt – time trial
