= Swimming at the 2014 Asian Games – Men's 50 metre butterfly =

Men's 50 metre butterfly at the 2014 Asian Games
- Venue: Munhak Park Tae-hwan Aquatics Center
- Date: 25 September 2014
- Competitors: 28 from 20 nations

Medalists
| gold medal | Shi Yang | China |
| silver medal | Joseph Schooling | Singapore |
| bronze medal | Yang Jung-doo | South Korea |

The men's 50 metre butterfly event at the 2014 Asian Games took place on 25 September 2014 at Munhak Park Tae-hwan Aquatics Center.

== Schedule ==
All times are Korea Standard Time (UTC+09:00)

| Date | Time | Event |
|---|---|---|
| Thursday, 25 September 2014 | 09:00 | Heats |
| Thursday, 25 September 2014 | 19:00 | Final |

== Records ==
Prior to this competition, the existing world, Asian and Games records were as follows.

| World Record | Rafael Muñoz (ESP) | 22.43 | Málaga, Spain | 5 April 2009 |
| Asian Record | Zhou Jiawei (CHN); Wu Peng (CHN); Joseph Schooling (SIN) | 23.43 | Shaoxing, China; Barcelona, Spain; Glasgow, United Kingdom | 6 April 2009; 28 July 2013; 24 July 2014 |
| Games Record | Zhou Jiawei (CHN) | 23.66 | Guangzhou, China | 16 November 2010 |

== Results ==
Legend

- DNS — Did not start

=== Heats ===
| Rank | Heat | Athlete | Time | Notes |
|---|---|---|---|---|
| 1 | 4 | Shi Yang (CHN) | 23.80 | |
| 2 | 2 | Yang Jung-doo (KOR) | 23.91 | |
| 3 | 4 | Joseph Schooling (SIN) | 24.10 | |
| 4 | 3 | Zhang Qibin (CHN) | 24.12 | |
| 5 | 3 | Hirofumi Ikebata (JPN) | 24.17 | |
| 6 | 3 | Takuro Fujii (JPN) | 24.19 | |
| 7 | 2 | Yun Seok-hwan (KOR) | 24.31 | |
| 8 | 2 | Geoffrey Cheah (HKG) | 24.41 | |
| 9 | 4 | Glenn Victor Sutanto (INA) | 24.87 | |
| 10 | 4 | Chang Kuo-chi (TPE) | 24.96 | |
| 11 | 2 | Islam Aslanov (UZB) | 24.97 | |
| 12 | 4 | Anthony Barbar (LIB) | 25.10 | |
| 13 | 3 | Derick Ng (HKG) | 25.30 | |
| 14 | 2 | Anshul Kothari (IND) | 25.67 | |
| 15 | 4 | Mohammed Al-Ghaferi (UAE) | 25.78 | |
| 16 | 2 | Mehdi Ansari (IRI) | 25.86 | |
| 17 | 3 | Vladislav Mustafin (UZB) | 25.95 | |
| 17 | 4 | Batsaikhany Dölgöön (MGL) | 25.95 | |
| 19 | 3 | Lao Kuan Fong (MAC) | 26.13 | |
| 20 | 3 | Chou Kit (MAC) | 26.28 | |
| 21 | 4 | Hassan Al-Mubarak (KSA) | 27.26 | |
| 22 | 2 | Ali Ashkanani (KUW) | 27.88 | |
| 23 | 1 | Muhammad Saad Amin (PAK) | 28.06 | |
| 24 | 2 | Nishwan Ibrahim (MDV) | 28.92 | |
| 25 | 3 | Mohamed Muthasim Adnan (MDV) | 29.82 | |
| 26 | 1 | Ali-Somon Aliakhmadzoda (TJK) | 30.63 | |
| 27 | 1 | Yousef Al-Nehmi (YEM) | 30.71 | |
| — | 1 | Nasir Ali (PAK) | DNS | |

=== Final ===
| Rank | Athlete | Time | Notes |
|---|---|---|---|
| 1st place, gold medalist(s) | Shi Yang (CHN) | 23.46 | GR |
| 2nd place, silver medalist(s) | Joseph Schooling (SIN) | 23.70 | |
| 3rd place, bronze medalist(s) | Yang Jung-doo (KOR) | 23.79 | |
| 4 | Hirofumi Ikebata (JPN) | 23.81 | |
| 5 | Zhang Qibin (CHN) | 23.83 | |
| 6 | Takuro Fujii (JPN) | 24.03 | |
| 7 | Geoffrey Cheah (HKG) | 24.25 | |
| 8 | Yun Seok-hwan (KOR) | 24.32 | |
