= Kuwait at the 2015 World Aquatics Championships =

- Flag of Kuwait
- FINA code: KUW
- National federation: Kuwait Swimming Association

in Kazan, Russia
- Competitors: 7 in 2 sports
- Medals: Gold 0 Silver 0 Bronze 0 Total 0

World Aquatics Championships appearances
- 1978; 1982; 1986; 1991; 1994; 1998; 2001; 2003; 2005; 2007; 2009; 2011; 2013; 2015; 2017; 2019; 2022; 2023; 2024

Kuwait competed at the 2015 World Aquatics Championships in Kazan, Russia from 24 July to 9 August 2015.

== Diving ==
Kuwaiti divers qualified for the individual spots at the World Championships.

Men

Athlete	Event	Preliminaries		Semifinals		Final	
Athlete	Event	Points	Rank	Points	Rank	Points	Rank
Abbas Abdulrahman	1 m springboard	243.00	37	—		did not advance	
Abbas Abdulrahman	3 m springboard	320.05	48	did not advance			
Hasan Qali	1 m springboard	192.90	40	—		did not advance	
Hasan Qali	3 m springboard	237.75	60	did not advance			

== Swimming ==
Kuwaiti swimmers have achieved qualifying standards in the following events (up to a maximum of 2 swimmers in each event at the A-standard entry time, and 1 at the B-standard):

Men

Athlete	Event	Heat		Semifinal		Final	
Athlete	Event	Time	Rank	Time	Rank	Time	Rank
Yousef Al-Askari	200 m freestyle	1:53.97	62	did not advance			
Ahmad Al-Bader	200 m breaststroke	2:16.50	40	did not advance			
Mohammad Madwa	50 m freestyle	23.50	49	did not advance			
Abbas Qali	100 m butterfly	54.35	44	did not advance			
Yousef Al-Askari; Ahmad Al-Bader; Abbas Qali; Mohammad Madwa	4×100 m medley relay	3:50.75	27	—		did not advance	

Women

Athlete	Event	Heat		Semifinal		Final	
Athlete	Event	Time	Rank	Time	Rank	Time	Rank
Faye Sultan	50 m freestyle	27.63	=64	did not advance			
Faye Sultan	100 m freestyle	59.66	67	did not advance			
