= Swimming at the 2013 World Aquatics Championships – Men's 50 metre butterfly =

Men's 50 metre butterfly at the 2013 World Aquatics Championships
- Venue: Palau Sant Jordi
- Dates: July 28, 2013 (heats & semifinals); July 29, 2013 (final)
- Competitors: 78 from 71 nations
- Winning time: 23.01

Medalists
gold medal	César Cielo	Brazil
silver medal	Eugene Godsoe	United States
bronze medal	Frédérick Bousquet	France

Barcelona Palau San Jordi

The men's 50 metre butterfly event in swimming at the 2013 World Aquatics Championships took place on 28–29 July at the Palau Sant Jordi in Barcelona, Spain.

== Records ==
Prior to this competition, the existing world and championship records were:

World record	Rafael Muñoz (ESP)	22.43	Málaga, Spain	5 April 2009
Competition record	Milorad Čavić (SRB)	22.67	Rome, Italy	27 July 2009

== Results ==
=== Heats ===
The heats were held at 11:05.

Rank	Heat	Lane	Name	Nationality	Time	Notes
1	9	5	Roland Mark Schoeman	South Africa	23.02	Q
2	7	3	Rafael Muñoz	Spain	23.17	Q
3	8	5	Florent Manaudou	France	23.18	Q
4	9	2	Andriy Hovorov	Ukraine	23.19	Q
5	9	7	Piero Codia	Italy	23.21	Q, NR
6	8	2	Matt Grevers	United States	23.29	Q
7	9	6	Eugene Godsoe	United States	23.31	Q
8	7	5	César Cielo	Brazil	23.32	Q
9	9	3	Matt Targett	Australia	23.36	Q
10	9	8	Wu Peng	China	23.43	Q
11	8	3	Yauhen Tsurkin	Belarus	23.45	Q
12	8	4	Nicholas Santos	Brazil	23.45	Q
13	9	4	Frédérick Bousquet	France	23.49	Q
14	8	6	Steffen Deibler	Germany	23.50	Q
15	7	4	Benjamin Proud	Great Britain	23.50	Q
16	9	9	Mario Todorović	Croatia	23.53	Q
17	7	2	Ivan Lenđer	Serbia	23.58	
18	7	9	Barry Murphy	Ireland	23.65	
19	8	8	Matteo Rivolta	Italy	23.65	
20	8	7	Yoris Grandjean	Belgium	23.68	
21	7	6	Konrad Czerniak	Poland	23.72	
22	7	7	François Heersbrandt	Belgium	23.75	
23	8	1	Chad le Clos	South Africa	23.76	
24	8	9	Yang Jung-Doo	South Korea	23.84	NR
25	7	8	Ben Hockin	Paraguay	23.94	NR
26	5	9	Elvis Burrows	Bahamas	23.98	
27	9	1	Yevgeny Korotyshkin	Russia	23.98	
28	7	1	Chris Wright	Australia	24.01	
29	5	4	Yevgeniy Lazuka	Azerbaijan	24.14	
30	8	0	Tadas Duskinas	Lithuania	24.15	
31	6	6	Simão Morgado	Portugal	24.20	
32	6	0	Coleman Allen	Canada	24.25	
33	9	0	Christos Katrantzis	Greece	24.29	
34	6	4	Bence Pulai	Hungary	24.31	
35	5	7	Mauricio Fiol	Peru	24.32	NR
36	6	7	Joshua McLeod	Trinidad and Tobago	24.43	
37	6	5	Riku Poytakivi	Finland	24.45	
38	5	5	Michal Navara	Slovakia	24.54	
39	6	8	Shehab Younis	Egypt	24.70	
40	5	6	Tomas Plevko	Czech Republic	24.71	
41	6	9	Norbert Trandafir	Romania	24.73	
42	5	2	Andrew Chetcuti	Malta	24.88	
43	5	8	Ricardo Yee	Panama	24.89	
44	5	1	Oliver Elliot	Chile	24.96	NR
45	6	3	İskender Baslakov	Turkey	24.98	
46	6	2	Tomer Zamir	Israel	25.06	
47	5	3	Gabriel Melconian Alvez	Uruguay	25.08	
48	6	1	Ifalemi Sau-Paea	Tonga	25.17	
49	4	7	Anthony Ralefy	Madagascar	25.53	
50	4	5	Yellow Yeiyah	Nigeria	25.56	
51	3	2	Christopher Clark	French Polynesia	25.81	
52	4	6	Adrian Todd	Botswana	25.98	
53	4	4	Sofyan El Gadi	Libya	26.08	
54	3	6	Oumar Toure	Mali	26.09	
55	7	0	Afshin Asgari	Iran	26.10	
56	4	1	Tyrone Alvarado	Ecuador	26.13	
57	4	8	Batsaikhan Dulguun	Mongolia	26.20	
58	4	0	Ralph Goveia	Zambia	26.31	
59	3	3	Niall Roberts	Guyana	26.39	
60	5	0	Damit Davletbaev	Kyrgyzstan	26.67	
61	4	2	Mohammad Anik Islam	Bangladesh	26.69	
62	3	4	D. Kalu Achchige	Sri Lanka	26.70	
63	3	5	Valdo Lourenco	Mozambique	26.72	
64	4	3	Sergeý Krowýakow	Turkmenistan	26.79	
65	3	7	Ameer Ali	Iraq	27.06	
66	4	9	Adam Viktoria	Seychelles	27.09	
67	1	5	Omar Omar	Qatar	27.10	
68	3	8	Syed Naqvi	Pakistan	27.11	
69	3	0	Kensuke Kimura	Northern Mariana Islands	28.01	
70	2	3	Ahmed Borhane	Djibouti	28.03	
71	3	9	Hilal Hemed Hilal	Tanzania	28.25	
72	3	1	Folarin Ogunsola	Gambia	28.50	
73	2	4	Noah Mascoll-Gomes	Antigua and Barbuda	28.71	
74	2	6	Adnan Mohamed Muthasim	Maldives	29.56	
75	2	7	Eloi Imaniraguha	Rwanda	30.36	
76	2	2	Esayas Ayele	Ethiopia	30.79	
77	2	1	Osman Kamara	Sierra Leone	35.66	
78	2	8	Derek Dainard	Federated States of Micronesia	35.88	
	1	4	Ayoub Bagla Gebsa Kalfo	Sudan		DNS
	2	5	Yousef Al-Nehmi	Yemen		DNS

=== Semifinals ===
The semifinals were held at 18:37.

==== Semifinal 1 ====
Rank	Lane	Name	Nationality	Time	Notes
1	6	César Cielo	Brazil	22.86	Q
2	7	Yauhen Tsurkin	Belarus	22.90	Q, NR
3	5	Andriy Hovorov	Ukraine	22.97	Q, NR
4	4	Rafael Muñoz	Spain	23.19	
5	1	Benjamin Proud	Great Britain	23.33	
6	3	Matt Grevers	United States	23.35	
7	8	Mario Todorović	Croatia	23.47	
8	2	Wu Peng	China	23.87	

==== Semifinal 2 ====
Rank	Lane	Name	Nationality	Time	Notes
1	7	Nicholas Santos	Brazil	22.81	Q
2	1	Frédérick Bousquet	France	22.93	Q
3	8	Steffen Deibler	Germany	23.02	Q
4	5	Florent Manaudou	France	23.15	Q
5	6	Eugene Godsoe	United States	23.16	Q
6	4	Roland Mark Schoeman	South Africa	23.25	
7	2	Matt Targett	Australia	23.39	
8	3	Piero Codia	Italy	23.50	

=== Final ===
The final was held at 18:47.

Rank	Lane	Name	Nationality	Time	Notes
1st place, gold medalist(s)	5	César Cielo	Brazil	23.01	
2nd place, silver medalist(s)	8	Eugene Godsoe	United States	23.05	
3rd place, bronze medalist(s)	6	Frédérick Bousquet	France	23.11	
4	4	Nicholas Santos	Brazil	23.21	
5	2	Andriy Hovorov	Ukraine	23.22	
6	3	Yauhen Tsurkin	Belarus	23.28	
6	7	Steffen Deibler	Germany	23.28	
8	1	Florent Manaudou	France	23.35	
