= Kuwait at the 2013 World Aquatics Championships =

- Flag of Kuwait
- FINA code: KUW
- National federation: Kuwait Swimming Association

in Barcelona, Spain
- Competitors: 4 in 2 sports
- Medals: Gold 0 Silver 0 Bronze 0 Total 0

World Aquatics Championships appearances
- 1978; 1982; 1986; 1991; 1994; 1998; 2001; 2003; 2005; 2007; 2009; 2011; 2013; 2015; 2017; 2019; 2022; 2023; 2024

Kuwait competed at the 2013 World Aquatics Championships in Barcelona, Spain from 19 July to 4 August 2013.

== Diving ==
Kuwait qualified a single quota for the following diving events.

Men

Athlete	Event	Preliminaries		Semifinals		Final	
Athlete	Event	Points	Rank	Points	Rank	Points	Rank
Abbas Abdulrahman	1 m springboard	270.25	38	—		did not advance	
Abbas Abdulrahman	3 m springboard	289.45	44	did not advance			

== Swimming ==
Kuwaiti swimmers earned qualifying standards in the following events (up to a maximum of 2 swimmers in each event at the A-standard entry time, and 1 at the B-standard):

Men

Athlete	Event	Heat		Semifinal		Final	
Athlete	Event	Time	Rank	Time	Rank	Time	Rank
Yousef Al-Askari	100 m butterfly	56.40	45	did not advance			
Yousef Al-Askari	200 m butterfly	2:07.03	32	did not advance			
Mohammad Madwa	50 m freestyle	23.34	46	did not advance			
Mohammad Madwa	100 m freestyle	52.06	48	did not advance			

Women

Athlete	Event	Heat		Semifinal		Final	
Athlete	Event	Time	Rank	Time	Rank	Time	Rank
Faye Sultan	50 m freestyle	27.25	48	did not advance			
Faye Sultan	50 m backstroke	31.36	43	did not advance			
