= Brunei at the 2013 Asian Indoor and Martial Arts Games =

- IOC code: BRU
- NOC: Brunei Darussalam National Olympic Council

in Incheon 29 June–6 July
- Competitors: 3 in 3 sports
- Medals: Gold 0 Silver 0 Bronze 0 Total 0

Asian Indoor and Martial Arts Games appearances
- 2009; 2013; 2017; 2021; 2025

Brunei competed at the 2013 Asian Indoor and Martial Arts Games held in Incheon, South Korea from June 26 to July 6 2013. Brunei left without a medal.

== Chess ==
Brunei participated in chess.

=== Individual ===
Athlete	Event	Round 1	Round 2	Round 3	Round 4	Round 5	Round 6	Round 7	Points	Rank
Athlete	Event	Opposition Score	Opposition Score	Opposition Score	Opposition Score	Opposition Score	Opposition Score	Opposition Score	Points	Rank
Yee Soon Wei	Men's individual standard	Dzhumaev (UZB); L 1-0	Hassan (MDV); W 1-0	Firmansyah (INA); L 1-0	Celis (MAC); W 1-0	Nezad (QAT); L 0-1	Malakar (NEP); W 1-0	Al-Zendani (YEM); D ½-½	3½	28

== Cue sports ==
Brunei participated in cue sports.

Men

Athlete	Event	Round of 64	Round of 32	Round of 16	Quarterfinals	Semifinals	Final	
Athlete	Event	Opposition Result	Opposition Result	Opposition Result	Opposition Result	Opposition Result	Opposition Result	Rank
Ahmad Taufiq Murni	Nine-ball singles	Bye	Yapp (SIN); W 9-6	Al-Hosani (UAE); W 6-9	Li (CHN); L 9-7	Did not advance		

== Short course swimming ==
Brunei participated in short course swimming.

Men

Athlete	Event	Heat		Final	
Athlete	Event	Time	Rank	Time	Rank
Anderson Lim	100 m freestyle	54.92	27	Did not advance	
Anderson Lim	200 m freestyle	1:58.84	21	Did not advance	
Anderson Lim	100 m butterfly	1:00.51	26	Did not advance	
