= Shi Yang (swimmer) =

Chinese swimmer (born 1989)

Personal information
- Born: January 4, 1989 (age 37) Shanghai, China

Sport
- Sport: Swimming
- Strokes: Butterfly
Medal record
Representing China
Asian Games
Gold medal – first place	2014 Incheon	50m butterfly

Shi Yang (施扬, born 4 January 1989) is a Chinese swimmer. He competed for China at the 2012 Summer Olympics in the men's 50 m freestyle.
