= Ning Zetao =

Chinese swimmer (born 1993)

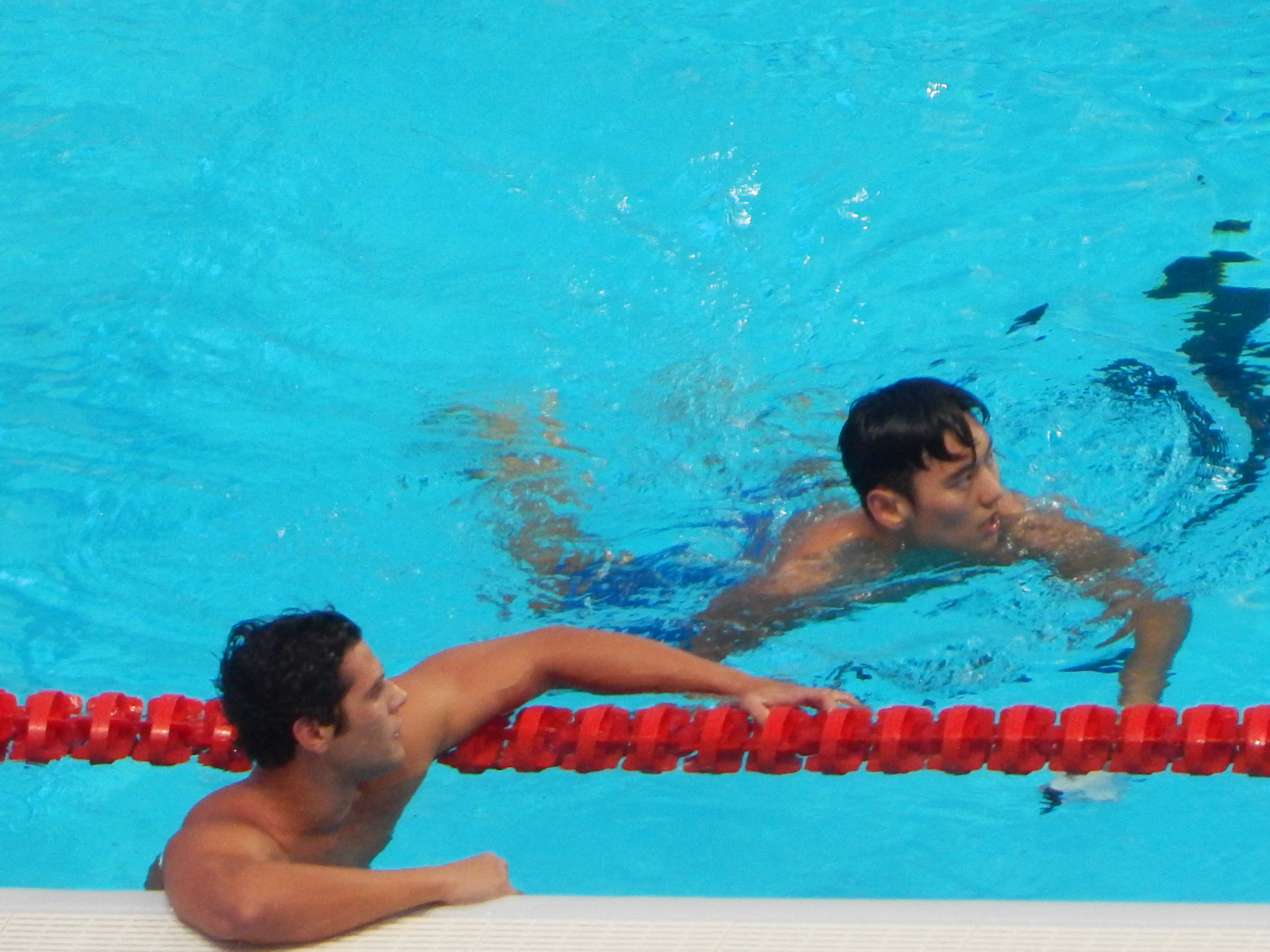
- Ning Zetao (right) in Kazan 2015

Personal information
- Full name: 宁泽涛
- Nickname: Baozi (包子)
- National team: China
- Born: 6 March 1993 (age 33) Zhengzhou, Henan, China
- Height: 1.91 m (6 ft 3 in)
- Weight: 81 kg (179 lb)

Sport
- Sport: Swimming
- Strokes: Freestyle
- Club: PLA Navy team
Medal record
Men's swimming
Representing China
World Championships (LC)
Gold medal – first place	2015 Kazan	100 m freestyle
Asian Games
Gold medal – first place	2014 Incheon	50 m freestyle
Gold medal – first place	2014 Incheon	100 m freestyle
Gold medal – first place	2014 Incheon	4×100 m freestyle
Gold medal – first place	2014 Incheon	4×100 m medley

Ning Zetao
- Simplified Chinese: 宁泽涛
- Traditional Chinese: 甯/寧澤濤 (surname uncertain) (Note: 甯 and 寧 are two different surnames in traditional Chinese that have merged into 宁 in simplified Chinese. These two surnames are pronounced differently; 甯 is pronounced as nìng with a falling tone, while 寧 is pronounced as níng with a rising tone. The ambiguity has been introduced in mainland China since the Chinese character reform in the 1950s, when the commission in charge of the reform declared that these two characters are merely variants, and merged both to an unrelated character 宁 originally pronounced as zhù, overlooking the fact that these two characters are not interchangeable when served as surnames.)
Transcriptions
Standard Mandarin
- Hanyu Pinyin: Nìng Zétāo

Ning Zetao (Chinese: 宁泽涛; pinyin: Nìng Zétāo or Níng Zétāo; Mandarin pronunciation: [nîŋ.tsɤ̌ tʰáʊ] or [nǐŋ.tsɤ̌ tʰáʊ]; born 6 March 1993) is a Chinese former competitive swimmer. Specializing in the freestyle, he won a gold medal in the 100 metre freestyle at the 2015 World Championships. At the 2014 Asian Games, he won gold medals in the 50 metre freestyle, 4 × 100 metre medley relay, 4 × 100 metre freestyle relay, and 100 metre freestyle, breaking the Asian records in the latter two events. Ning also swam for China at the 2016 Summer Olympics, but failed to proceed to any final at the meet.

On March 6, 2019, Ning announced his retirement from competitive swimming through his Weibo account, on his 26th birthday.

== Early life ==
Ning Zetao was born in Zhengzhou, the capital city of Henan. He is the only child of Ning Feng (宁锋) and Liu Wenhong (刘文红). Ning's father, Ning Feng, served four years in the air force reserve prior to working for a state broadcasting company. His mother, Liu Wenhong, served in the Chinese People's Armed Police Force. Both of his grandfathers also served in the Chinese military.

Ning started swimming at age 8. Before then, he was even afraid of washing his hair. His parents took him to a swimming school to help him overcome his fear of water and to improve his physical health. Local coach Guo Hongyan noticed Ning's quick grasp on learning different strokes and techniques. She persuaded Ning's parents to have him trained under her. At age 11, Ning Zetao became a member of Henan provincial swimming team. At age 14, Ning was accepted to the PLA Navy's swimming team. He started training under Ye Jin, a well-known coach who remains his coach today. Initially, he trained for the 200-meter and 400-meter individual medley races. Because he suffered from chronic bone calcification on his right knee, he switched from individual medley to sprint freestyle.

Following his family's military background, Ning served as a lieutenant in the Chinese Navy.

Ning cites Alexander Popov as his role model.

On March 6, 2019, on his 26th birthday, Ning announced his retirement from competitive swimming on his Weibo. He has stated in interviews that he wishes to study for two years after retirement before deciding what to do for his career. Ning has insisted that he would not be entering the entertainment industry despite huge speculation and interest.

== Career ==
=== October 2009 ===
At age 16, Ning competed in the 11th Chinese National Games, Shandong, China. He advanced to the 400-meter medley final and finished in 8th place.

=== April 2011 ===
Ning competed in the Chinese National Swimming Championships, Wuhan, Hubei, China. This was his first time competing in a sprint freestyle event. He advanced to the 100-meter free final and finished 4th with a time of 50.05. Lv Zhiwu from Team Zhejiang finished in first place with a time of 49.46.

=== April 2013 ===
Ning defeated two-time defending champion Lv Zhiwu at the Chinese National Swimming Championships, Zhengzhou, Henan, China, winning his first national championship in the 100-meter free in his hometown, setting the new national record with a time of 48.60 on April 5, 2013. He also won first place in the 50-meter free with a record time of 22.41 on April 7, 2013. This event marked the beginning of his dominance in sprint freestyle in China.

=== September 2013 ===
He broke his own record time in the 100-meter free at the 12th Chinese National Games, Shenyang, Liaoning, China, establishing a new Asian record at 48.27 on September 8; the very next day, he continued his record-breaking performance, setting a new Asian record for the 50-meter free at 21.91.

=== October 2013 ===
In the East Asian Games, Tianjin, China, Ning placed first in both the 100-meter free with a time of 48.41, and the 50-meter free with a time of 22.20 on October 13 and 14, respectively. He also won silver in the 4 × 100-meter free relay. His record-breaking streak earned him a spot in Chinese national swimming team.

At the Chinese National Swimming Championships, Huangshan, Anhui, China on October 26, Ning won a gold medal in 50-meter butterfly with a time of 24.13. Due to a fever, however, he did not compete in any other events.

=== June 2014 ===
Competing for the Chinese Liberation Army at the 45th CISM World Military Swimming & Lifesaving Championships, Tenero, Switzerland, Ning earned a gold medal in the 100-meter free, setting a new CISM world record at 48.48. He won another gold in the men's 50-meter free. He was not in his best physical state at the games due to a wrist injury sustained a few months prior to the competition.

=== September 2014 ===
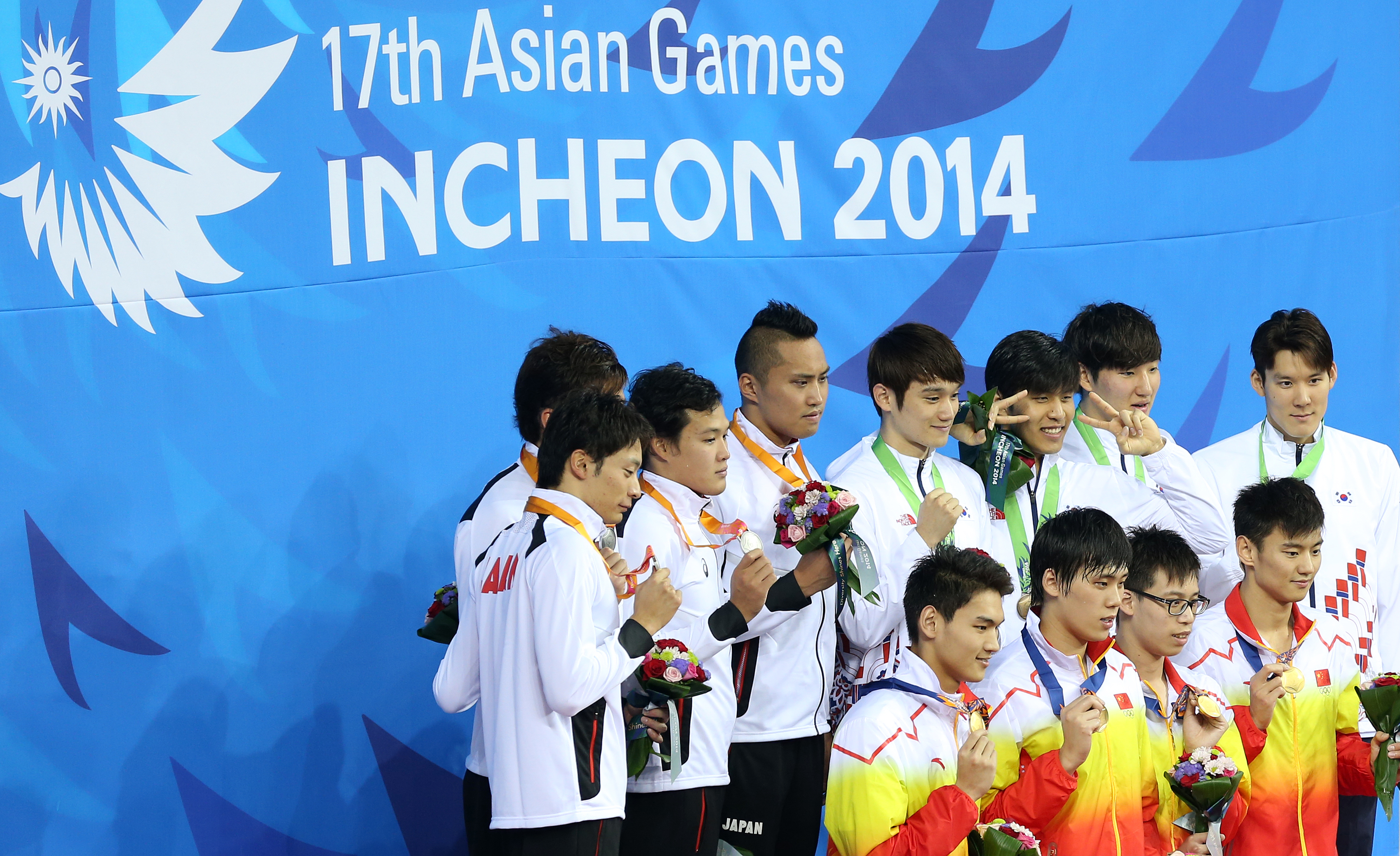
Ning and his teammates (those ones in the front row) in 2014 Asian Games

The 17th Asian Games, in Incheon, South Korea, was the first major championship outside China he competed in. September 23, Ning earned his first gold in the 50-meter free in an Asian Games with a time of 21.95. On September 25, he beat South Korea's Park Tae-hwan and Japan's Shioura Shinri setting the new Asian record time of 47.70 in the 100-meter free; he was the first Asian swimmer to break the 48-second barrier. On September 24, in the men's 4 × 100-meter free relay, teamed with Yu Hexin, Lin Yongqing, Sun Yang, Ning swam the fourth leg and ensured China finished in first place and set a new Asian record with a time of 3:13.47. On September 26, in the men's 4 × 100-meter medley relay, with Xu Jiayu, Li Xiang, Li Zhuhao, swimming the fourth leg, Ning overtook strong rival, Japan's Shioura Shinri in the last 50 meters and helped China win gold in a time of 3:31:37.

=== October 2014 ===
Continuing his dominance in the freestyle sprints at the Chinese National Swimming Championships, Huangshan, Anhui, China, Ning broke his previous Incheon Asian record of 47.70 in the 100-meter free with a new time of 47.65 on October 17. He also won a silver medal in the 50-meter butterfly with a time of 23.65. Due to food poisoning, he did not compete in the 50-meter free event.

At the 2014 FINA Swimming World Cup in Beijing, Yu Hexin, Suo Ran, Lu Ying, with Ning swam the fourth leg in the mixed 4 × 50-meter medley relay, finished in first place with a time of 1:40.10. In the 50-meter free final, he placed in third with a time of 21.35. Chad le Clos of South Africa won first place with a time of 21.28.

=== December 2014 ===
At the 2014 FINA World Swimming Championships (25 m) in Doha, again with Ning swimming the final leg in the mixed 4 × 50-meter medley relay, China finished in the 6th place, but Ning recorded a split-time of 20.59. In the men's 4 × 100-meter free relay heats, he swam the second leg with a time of 46.13, putting China in 10th place overall. In the 50-meter free heat, he reached a personal best of 21.26 and finished in 12th place in the semi-final with a time of 21.37. Due to a wrist injury, he did not compete in the 100-meter free final.

=== April 2015 ===
The Chinese National Swimming Championships, Baoji, Shaanxi, China, served as Chinese swimmers' qualifying selection for the 16th FINA World Aquatics Championships held in Kazan, Russia. From April 12 to April 15, Ning competed in two events: 100-meter freestyle and 50-meter freestyle. In the 100-meter freestyle semifinal, he finished first with a time of 48.34. In the final, he recorded a time of 48.36 and a reaction time of 0.72 winning the first place. Yu Hexin finished 2nd with a time of 49.11. Both swimmers meet the 16th FINA 100-meter freestyle Level A qualifying time of 49.39. In the 50-meter freestyle semifinal, Ning recorded a time of 22.31 with reaction time of 0.62; in the final, he finished in first place with a time of 22.17 and a reaction time of 0.72. Again, Yu Hexin finished in the 2nd place with a time of 22.47. Ning has met 16th FINA’S Level A qualifying time of 22.25 for this event. In an interview with CCTV5 Sports, Ning confirmed that he had not fully recovered from his wrist injury and was hoping to undergo more effective treatment in preparation for the upcoming World Championships. He also expressed in this interview his desire to train overseas.

=== July 24, 2015, to August 9, 2015 ===
Competing for the Chinese National swimming team at the 16th FINA World Aquatics Championships in Kazan, Russia, Ning with teammates Yu Hexin, Lin Yongqing and Jiang Qiheng competed in the 4 × 100-meter freestyle relay on August 2. He swam the first leg and led the Chinese team to advance to the final, marking the first time the Chinese men's team reached this far in this event at the FINA World Aquatics Championships. China finished 7th in the final with a time of 3:15:41. Ning's lead-off time of 48.37 made him the tied 2nd best among the lead-off legs in this event. On August 5, Ning competed in the 100-meter freestyle heats. Ning finished in first place with a time of 48.11. In the semifinals, Ning delivered another solid performance with a time of 48.13, coming in 2nd place. On August 6, in the 100-meter freestyle final, Ning gave his best performance, taking the lead at 50 meters and finishing in first place with a time of 47.84 (RT: 0.67, 1st 50 meters: 22.76), 0.09 seconds ahead of Cameron McEvoy who finished in 2nd place. Ning winning the gold marked a milestone achievement in the Chinese swimming, as prior to Ning's victory, no Asian swimmer had ever advanced to the final or won medals in this event at the FINA world championships. Legendary Russian swimmer Alexander Popov presented Ning with the gold medal; Ning had been a longtime fan of Popov and has expressed his admiration of Popov on numerous occasions. In the interview after the race, Ning credited his success to the six weeks he spent training under Australian Coach Matthew Brown. On August 7, Ning raced in the men's 50-meter freestyle, finishing in 14th place with a time of 22.43 and advancing to the semifinal. He came in 15th place in the semifinal with a time of 22.28 and failed to advance to the final.

=== 2016 Summer Olympics ===
The 2016 Summer Olympics was Ning's first Olympic Games. In his individual events, Ning finished in 30th place in the Men's 50 metre freestyle and in 12th place in the Men's 100 metre freestyle. In the relay races, due to teammates' false starts, Ning was disqualified from both the Men's 4 × 100 metre freestyle relay and Men's 4 × 100 metre medley relay.

== Personal bests (long course) ==
As of October 17, 2014

Event	Time	Meet	Date	Note(s)
50 m butterfly	23.65	2014 Chinese National Swimming Championships	October 15, 2014	
50 m freestyle	21.91	2013 National Games of China	September 11, 2013	NR
100 m freestyle	47.65	2014 Chinese National Swimming Championships	October 17, 2014	AS

Key: AS = Asian Record, NR = National Record

== Failed drug test ==
In April 2011, eighteen-year old Ning was tested positive for clenbuterol, which led to a one-year suspension. He filed an appeal to overturn the ban, but was denied.

== Awards ==
Ning received the CCTV Sports Award for Best Male Athlete in 2014 for his achievements in sprint freestyle. Ning won the Best Male Athlete of the Year again in 2015 at CCTV Sports Personality of Year Award for his gold winning performance at the 16th FINA World Championships in Kazan, Russia.

== Endorsements ==
Since the 2014 Incheon Asian Games, Ning has gained great popularity nationwide, having become the spokesperson for Skullcandy, China and Shanghai Pudong Development Bank Co., FitBit China, Gillette China, De Beers China, Alexander Wang, and Adidas.

The Chinese National Swimming team has endorsement deals with 361 Degrees, Chinese automaker Geely and Midea. Ning often appears in advertisements or promotional events alongside other members of the Chinese National Swimming Team.

== Controversy ==
Ning, as a very popular swimming icon nationwide, has had various appearances in magazine covers, commercial posters and TV shows. Before the 2016 Summer Olympics, Ning was featured in a Yili milk commercial. Yili milk is a competitor to the national swimming team’s sponsor, Mengniu milk. Ning was forced to stop his training from Australia, returned to China, found his meal card locked, and was threatened to leave his apartment, which was provided by the National Swimming Center. Ning had been forced to stop training for a few weeks. Two weeks before the Olympics, he was informed that he would be on the National Team representing China. Ning was at his best form, but this sudden development changed his form for competing and it was a life changing event for him. Since then, the General Administration of Sports strongly criticized Ning's extensive off-the-court activities. Some gossip sites even claimed that Ning would be expelled from the National Team. Ning blamed high stress and pressure for this situation. Ning signed a new contract with Adidas in January 2017.

== Notes ==
Records
Preceded by (China) Lü Zhiwu	Men's 100-metre freestyle Asian record-holder (long course); 8 September 2013 – 27 July 2023	Succeeded by (China) Pan Zhanle
