= Pencak silat at the 2009 Asian Indoor Games =

- Venue: Hải Dương Gymnasium
- Dates: 2–7 November 2009

Pencak silat was contested at the 2009 Asian Indoor Games in Hải Dương, Vietnam from 2 November to 7 November. The competition took place at Hải Dương Gymnasium. There were four seni events in original program but men's regu event was cancelled due to lack of entries.

== Medalists ==
=== Seni ===
Event	Gold	Silver	Bronze
Men's tunggal	Ahmad Saiful Shamsuddin; Malaysia	Nguyễn Việt Anh; Vietnam	Khairul Bahrin Durahman; Brunei
Women's tunggal	Rabiatul Adawiyah Yusak; Singapore	Ni Luh Putu Spyanawati; Indonesia	Nurama Chedo; Thailand
Women's regu	Vietnam; Vũ Thị Thảo; Nguyễn Thị Bình; Ngô Thị Quyên	Brunei; Norleyermah Hj Raya; Nurul Aimi Amalina Zanidi; Norleyharyanti Hj Raya	Malaysia; Siti Nur Eyisah; Suzy Sulaiman; Noor Marina Kamaruddin

=== Men's tanding ===
Event	Gold	Silver	Bronze
Class B 50–55 kg	Nanthachai Khansakhon; Thailand	Trần Văn Toàn; Vietnam	Okhe Botsavang; Laos
Class B 50–55 kg	Nanthachai Khansakhon; Thailand	Trần Văn Toàn; Vietnam	Faizul Nasir; Malaysia
Class C 55–60 kg	Nguyễn Bá Trình; Vietnam	Agus Triyono; Indonesia	Amir Ikram Rahim; Malaysia
Class C 55–60 kg	Nguyễn Bá Trình; Vietnam	Agus Triyono; Indonesia	Thitsaphone Khamphithoun; Laos
Class D 60–65 kg	Muhammad Sodik; Indonesia	Saeid Salehi; Iran	Khuzaiman Ahmad; Brunei
Class D 60–65 kg	Muhammad Sodik; Indonesia	Saeid Salehi; Iran	Saifullah Julaimi; Singapore
Class E 65–70 kg	Al-Jufferi Jamari; Malaysia	Saifuddin Julaimi; Singapore	Fakhriddin Shermuhammedov; Uzbekistan
Class E 65–70 kg	Al-Jufferi Jamari; Malaysia	Saifuddin Julaimi; Singapore	Sanchai Chomphuphuang; Thailand
Class F 70–75 kg	Mulyono; Indonesia	Masoud Ghiasifar; Iran	Khairul Bahri Ali Umar; Brunei
Class F 70–75 kg	Mulyono; Indonesia	Masoud Ghiasifar; Iran	Đinh Công Sơn; Vietnam
Class G 75–80 kg	Vũ Thế Hoàng; Vietnam	Shakir Juanda; Singapore	Freddy Ashrul Choo; Brunei
Class G 75–80 kg	Vũ Thế Hoàng; Vietnam	Shakir Juanda; Singapore	Mehdi Ahadzadeh; Iran
Class H 80–85 kg	Nguyễn Thanh Quyền; Vietnam	Nur Shafiq Saiful; Singapore	Azrul Abdullah; Malaysia
Class H 80–85 kg	Nguyễn Thanh Quyền; Vietnam	Nur Shafiq Saiful; Singapore	Pheumthavy Vongphackdy; Laos

=== Women's tanding ===
Event	Gold	Silver	Bronze
Class A 45–50 kg	Boutsady Soudavong; Laos	Nurindah Mursani; Singapore	None awarded
Class A 45–50 kg	Boutsady Soudavong; Laos	Nurindah Mursani; Singapore	None awarded
Class B 50–55 kg	Huỳnh Thị Thu Hồng; Vietnam	Mahani Bakri; Malaysia	Nur Dinniyati Julaimi; Singapore
Class B 50–55 kg	Huỳnh Thị Thu Hồng; Vietnam	Mahani Bakri; Malaysia	Rosmayani; Indonesia
Class C 55–60 kg	Anissa Pangestina; Indonesia	Jutarat Noytapa; Thailand	Bouaphay Vongkhamsone; Laos
Class C 55–60 kg	Anissa Pangestina; Indonesia	Jutarat Noytapa; Thailand	Siti Zuliza Omar; Brunei
Class D 60–65 kg	Nguyễn Thị Phương Thùy; Vietnam	Jongdee Hemkaeo; Thailand	Siti Rahmah Nasir; Malaysia
Class D 60–65 kg	Nguyễn Thị Phương Thùy; Vietnam	Jongdee Hemkaeo; Thailand	Nadira Kazakova; Uzbekistan
Class E 65–70 kg	Lê Thị Hồng Ngoan; Vietnam	Monruthai Bangsalad; Thailand	Puspa Endah Fitriani; Indonesia
Class E 65–70 kg	Lê Thị Hồng Ngoan; Vietnam	Monruthai Bangsalad; Thailand	None awarded

== Medal table ==
Rank	Nation	Gold	Silver	Bronze	Total
1	Vietnam (VIE)	7	2	1	10
2	Indonesia (INA)	3	2	2	7
3	Malaysia (MAS)	2	1	5	8
4	Singapore (SIN)	1	4	2	7
5	Thailand (THA)	1	3	2	6
6	Laos (LAO)	1	0	4	5
7	Iran (IRI)	0	2	1	3
8	Brunei (BRU)	0	1	5	6
9	Uzbekistan (UZB)	0	0	2	2
Totals (9 entries)		15	15	24	54

== Results ==
=== Seni ===
==== Men's tunggal ====
5 November

Rank	Athlete	Score
1st place, gold medalist(s)	Ahmad Saiful Shamsuddin (MAS)	452
2nd place, silver medalist(s)	Nguyễn Việt Anh (VIE)	450
3rd place, bronze medalist(s)	Khairul Bahrin Durahman (BRU)	443
4	I Gusti Ngurah Arya Yudha (INA)	443
5	Sarawut Comepoon (THA)	427
6	Youthisinh Phoutthalaksa (LAO)	400

==== Women's tunggal ====
5 November

Rank	Athlete	Score
1st place, gold medalist(s)	Rabiatul Adawiyah Yusak (SIN)	463
2nd place, silver medalist(s)	Ni Luh Putu Spyanawati (INA)	455
3rd place, bronze medalist(s)	Nurama Chedo (THA)	432
4	Souksakhon Chanthilath (LAO)	415

==== Women's regu ====
5 November

Rank	Team	Score
1st place, gold medalist(s)	Vietnam (VIE)	449
2nd place, silver medalist(s)	Brunei (BRU)	423
3rd place, bronze medalist(s)	Malaysia (MAS)	394

=== Men's tanding ===
==== 55 kg ====
Quarterfinals; 3 November
Okhe Botsavang (LAO)	3
Amali Hj Abd Malik (BRU)	2
Andi Supiantoro (INA)	2
Faizul Nasir (MAS)	3
Furkat Omanov (UZB)	0
Nanthachai Khansakhon (THA)	5

Semifinals; 4 November
Okhe Botsavang (LAO)	0
Trần Văn Toàn (VIE)	5
Faizul Nasir (MAS)	1
Nanthachai Khansakhon (THA)	4

Final; 7 November
Trần Văn Toàn (VIE)	1
Nanthachai Khansakhon (THA)	4

==== 60 kg ====
Quarterfinals; 3 November
Amir Ikram Rahim (MAS)	5
Prasit Warlam (THA)	0

Semifinals; 4 November
Amir Ikram Rahim (MAS)	2
Agus Triyono (INA)	3
Nguyễn Bá Trình (VIE)	5
Thitsaphone Khamphithoun (LAO)	0

Final; 7 November
Agus Triyono (INA)	0
Nguyễn Bá Trình (VIE)	5

==== 65 kg ====
Quarterfinals; 3 November		Semifinals; 4 November		Final; 7 November
Ramli Usman (MAS)	0
Khuzaiman Ahmad (BRU)	5	Khuzaiman Ahmad (BRU)	1
Bakhtiyor Norov (UZB)	0	Saeid Salehi (IRI)	4
Saeid Salehi (IRI)	5			Saeid Salehi (IRI)	0
Saifullah Julaimi (SIN)	3			Muhammad Sodik (INA)	5
Olanh Sihalath (LAO)	2	Saifullah Julaimi (SIN)	1
Muhammad Sodik (INA)	3	Muhammad Sodik (INA)	4
Chaiwat Nimma (THA)	2

==== 70 kg ====
Quarterfinals; 3 November
Al-Jufferi Jamari (MAS)	4
Sinhkhone Xayaphomma (LAO)	1
Sanchai Chomphuphuang (THA)	3
Kifli Hj Hamzah (BRU)	2

Semifinals; 4 November
Al-Jufferi Jamari (MAS)	5
Fakhriddin Shermuhammedov (UZB)	0
Saifuddin Julaimi (SIN)	5
Sanchai Chomphuphuang (THA)	0

Final; 7 November
Al-Jufferi Jamari (MAS)	4
Saifuddin Julaimi (SIN)	1

==== 75 kg ====
Quarterfinals; 3 November
Khairul Bahri Ali Umar (BRU)	4
Katahat Raksapon (THA)	1
Elyasak Said (SIN)	0
Đinh Công Sơn (VIE)	5

Semifinals; 4 November
Khairul Bahri Ali Umar (BRU)
Masoud Ghiasifar (IRI)	TW
Mulyono (INA)	5
Đinh Công Sơn (VIE)	0

Final; 7 November
Masoud Ghiasifar (IRI)	0
Mulyono (INA)	5

==== 80 kg ====
Quarterfinals; 2 November
Arles Salfitra (INA)	0
Vũ Thế Hoàng (VIE)	5

Semifinals; 4 November
Vũ Thế Hoàng (VIE)	5
Freddy Ashrul Choo (BRU)	0
Mehdi Ahadzadeh (IRI)	0
Shakir Juanda (SIN)	5

Final; 7 November
Vũ Thế Hoàng (VIE)	5
Shakir Juanda (SIN)	0

==== 85 kg ====
Semifinals; 3 November		Final; 7 November
Nguyễn Thanh Quyền (VIE)	5
Azrul Abdullah (MAS)	0	Nguyễn Thanh Quyền (VIE)	5
Pheumthavy Vongphackdy (LAO)	0	Nur Shafiq Saiful (SIN)	0
Nur Shafiq Saiful (SIN)	5

=== Women's tanding ===
==== 50 kg ====
Final; 7 November
Nurindah Mursani (SIN)	0
Boutsady Soudavong (LAO)	5

==== 55 kg ====
Quarterfinals; 3 November
Somphavanh Mounvong (LAO)	0
Mahani Bakri (MAS)	5

Semifinals; 4 November
Mahani Bakri (MAS)	5
Nur Dinniyati Julaimi (SIN)	0
Huỳnh Thị Thu Hồng (VIE)	5
Rosmayani (INA)	0

Final; 7 November
Mahani Bakri (MAS)	0
Huỳnh Thị Thu Hồng (VIE)	5

==== 60 kg ====
Quarterfinals; 3 November
Wan Nurul Hidayu (MAS)	0
Anissa Pangestina (INA)	5

Semifinals; 4 November
Anissa Pangestina (INA)	5
Bouaphay Vongkhamsone (LAO)	0
Jutarat Noytapa (THA)	5
Siti Zuliza Omar (BRU)	0

Final; 7 November
Anissa Pangestina (INA)	3
Jutarat Noytapa (THA)	2

==== 65 kg ====
Quarterfinals; 2 November
Nur Zulaikha Zakaria (SIN)	0
Nguyễn Thị Phương Thùy (VIE)	5

Semifinals; 3 November
Nguyễn Thị Phương Thùy (VIE)	5
Siti Rahmah Nasir (MAS)	0
Nadira Kazakova (UZB)	0
Jongdee Hemkaeo (THA)	5

Final; 7 November
Nguyễn Thị Phương Thùy (VIE)	5
Jongdee Hemkaeo (THA)	0

==== 70 kg ====
Semifinals; 4 November		Final; 7 November
Puspa Endah Fitriani (INA)	0
Lê Thị Hồng Ngoan (VIE)	5	Lê Thị Hồng Ngoan (VIE)	5
		Monruthai Bangsalad (THA)	0
