= Kuwait at the 2019 World Aquatics Championships =

- Flag of Kuwait
- FINA code: KUW
- National federation: Kuwait Swimming Association

World Aquatics Championships appearances
- 1978; 1982; 1986; 1991; 1994; 1998; 2001; 2003; 2005; 2007; 2009; 2011; 2013; 2015; 2017; 2019; 2022; 2023; 2024

Kuwait competed at the 2019 World Aquatics Championships in Gwangju, South Korea from 12 to 28 July.

== Diving ==
Kuwait entered four divers.

Men

Athlete	Event	Preliminaries		Semifinals		Final	
Athlete	Event	Points	Rank	Points	Rank	Points	Rank
Sulaiman Al-Sabe	1 m springboard	273.90	36	—		did not advance	
Hasan Qali	1 m springboard	207.35	43	—		did not advance	
Rashid Al-Harbi	3 m springboard	181.80	57	did not advance			
Abdulrahman Abbas	3 m springboard	253.45	54	did not advance			
Abdulrahman Abbas; Hasan Qali	3 m synchronized springboard	307.77	20	—		did not advance	

== Swimming ==
Kuwait entered four swimmers.

Men

Athlete	Event	Heat		Semifinal		Final	
Athlete	Event	Time	Rank	Time	Rank	Time	Rank
Waleed Abdulrazzak	50 m freestyle	23.64	66	did not advance			
Waleed Abdulrazzak	100 m freestyle	50.63	57	did not advance			
Rashed Altarmoom	50 m breaststroke	30.13	58	did not advance			
Rashed Altarmoom	100 m breaststroke	1:06.35	70	did not advance			
Ali Al-Zamil	50 m backstroke	26.79	50	did not advance			
Ali Al-Zamil	100 m backstroke	58.63	51	did not advance			
Abbas Qali	50 m butterfly	24.91	52	did not advance			
Abbas Qali	100 m butterfly	54.67	45	did not advance			
