= Ahmed Borhane =

Djiboutian swimmer

Personal information
- Born: 1995 (age 30–31)

Sport
- Sport: Swimming
- Strokes: Butterfly, freestyle

Borhane Abro (born 1995) is a Djiboutian swimmer.

== Competitions ==
He competed in the 50, 100 m freestyle, 50 m butterfly and 100 m butterfly events at the 2012 FINA World Swimming Championships (25 m).

Borhane also took part in the 50 m freestyle, and 50 m butterfly events at the 2013 World Aquatics Championships.
