= Brunei at the 2017 Asian Indoor and Martial Arts Games =

- IOC code: BRU
- NOC: Brunei Darussalam National Olympic Council
- Website: www.bruneiolympic.org

in Ashgabat 17–27 September
- Competitors: 1 in 1 sport
- Medals: Gold 0 Silver 0 Bronze 0 Total 0

Asian Indoor and Martial Arts Games appearances
- 2009; 2013; 2017; 2021; 2025

Brunei competed at the 2017 Asian Indoor and Martial Arts Games held in Ashgabat, Turkmenistan from September 17 to 27. Brunei sent a delegation consisting of only 1 billiards player for the event.

Brunei didn't receive any medal at the Games.

== Participants ==
Sport	Men	Women	Total
Billiards	1	0	1
