= Brunei at the 2009 Asian Indoor Games =

- IOC code: BRU
- NOC: Brunei Darussalam National Olympic Council
- Website: www.bruneiolympic.org (in English)

in Hanoi
- Competitors: 13 in 3 sports
- Medals Ranked 27th: Gold 0 Silver 1 Bronze 6 Total 7

Asian Indoor Games appearances
- 2009; 2013; 2017; 2021; 2025

Brunei participated in the 2009 Asian Indoor Games in Hanoi, Vietnam on 30 October – 8 November 2009.

== Medal winners ==
Medal	Name	Sport	Event	Date
Silver	Norleyermah Hj Raya; Norleyharyanti Hj Raya; Nurul Aimi Amalina Zanidi	Pencak Silat	Women's Team Regu	
Bronze	Khuzaiman Ahmad	Pencak Silat	Men's Class D (>60 kg to 65 kg)	
Bronze	Pg Khairul Bahri Pg Ali Umar	Pencak Silat	Men's Class F(>70 kg to 75 kg)	
Bronze	Freddy Ashrul Choo	Pencak Silat	Men's Class G (>75 kg to 80 kg)	
Bronze	Md Khairul Bahrin Durahman	Pencak Silat	Men's Single Tunggal	
Bronze	Siti Zuliza Omar	Pencak Silat	Women's Class C (>55 kg to 60 kg)	
Bronze	Faustina Woo Wai Sii; Lee Ying Shi	Wushu	Women's Single Weapon vs. Weapon	
