= Kuwait at the 2011 World Aquatics Championships =

- FINA code: KUW

in Shanghai, China
- Competitors: 4 in 2 sports
- Medals: Gold 0 Silver 0 Bronze 0 Total 0

World Aquatics Championships appearances
- 1978; 1982; 1986; 1991; 1994; 1998; 2001; 2003; 2005; 2007; 2009; 2011; 2013; 2015; 2017; 2019; 2022; 2023; 2024

Kuwait competed at the 2011 World Aquatics Championships in Shanghai, China between July 16 and 31, 2011.

== Diving ==
Kuwait has qualified 2 athletes in diving.

Men

Athlete	Event	Preliminary		Semifinals		Final	
Athlete	Event	Points	Rank	Points	Rank	Points	Rank
Hamad Saleh	Men's 1m Springboard	282.55	32			did not advance	
Rashid Alharbi	Men's 3m Springboard	250.35	51	did not advance			

== Swimming ==
Kuwait qualified 2 swimmers.

Men

Athlete	Event	Heats		Semifinals		Final	
Athlete	Event	Time	Rank	Time	Rank	Time	Rank
Mohamed Madouh	Men's 100m Freestyle	53.07	62	did not advance			
Mohamed Madouh	Men's 200m Freestyle	1:57.64	53	did not advance			
Abdullah Al-Tuwaini	Men's 100m Backstroke	56.94	41	did not advance			
Abdullah Al-Tuwaini	Men's 200m Backstroke	2:07.63	29	did not advance			
