= Kuwait at the 2024 World Aquatics Championships =

- Flag of Kuwait
- FINA code: KUW
- National federation: Kuwait Aquatics

in Doha, Qatar
- Competitors: 5 in 1 sport
- Medals: Gold 0 Silver 0 Bronze 0 Total 0

World Aquatics Championships appearances
- 1978; 1982; 1986; 1991; 1994; 1998; 2001; 2003; 2005; 2007; 2009; 2011; 2013; 2015; 2017; 2019; 2022; 2023; 2024

Kuwait competed at the 2024 World Aquatics Championships in Doha, Qatar from 2 to 18 February.

== Competitors ==
The following is the list of competitors in the Championships.

Sport	Men	Women	Total
Swimming	4	1	5
Total	4	1	5

== Swimming ==
Kuwait entered 5 swimmers.

Men

Athlete	Event	Heat		Semifinal		Final	
Athlete	Event	Time	Rank	Time	Rank	Time	Rank
Khaled Al-Otaibi	200 metre freestyle	1:58.02	59	Did not advance			
Khaled Al-Otaibi	400 metre freestyle	4:14.64	51	—		Did not advance	
Mohammad Al-Otaibi	50 metre butterfly	27.41	52	Did not advance			
Mohammad Al-Otaibi	100 metre butterfly	58.47	53	Did not advance			
Rashed Al-Tarmoom	50 metre breaststroke	29.95	46	Did not advance			
Rashed Al-Tarmoom	100 metre breaststroke	Did not start		Did not advance			
Mohamad Zubaid	50 metre freestyle	24.25	66	Did not advance			
Mohamad Zubaid	100 metre freestyle	52.21	65	Did not advance			

Women

Athlete	Event	Heat		Semifinal		Final	
Athlete	Event	Time	Rank	Time	Rank	Time	Rank
Lara Dashti	50 metre freestyle	29.27	78	Did not advance			
Lara Dashti	100 metre breaststroke	1:18.83	47	Did not advance			
