= Kuwait at the 2022 World Aquatics Championships =

- Flag of Kuwait
- FINA code: KUW
- National federation: Kuwait Swimming Association

in Budapest, Hungary
- Competitors: 7 in 2 sports
- Medals: Gold 0 Silver 0 Bronze 0 Total 0

World Aquatics Championships appearances
- 1978; 1982; 1986; 1991; 1994; 1998; 2001; 2003; 2005; 2007; 2009; 2011; 2013; 2015; 2017; 2019; 2022; 2023; 2024

Kuwait competed at the 2022 World Aquatics Championships in Budapest, Hungary from 17 June to 3 July.

== Diving ==
Kuwait entered four divers. Sulaiman Al-Sabe was replaced in the men's 1 metre springboard competition by Hasan Qali.

Men

Athlete	Event	Preliminaries		Semifinals		Final	
Athlete	Event	Points	Rank	Points	Rank	Points	Rank
Abdulrahman Abbas	1 m springboard	254.50	42	—		did not advance	
Abdulrahman Abbas	3 m springboard	269.05	48	did not advance			
Hasan Qali	1 m springboard	249.05	44	—		did not advance	
Ahmad Qali	10 m platform	276.70	38	did not advance			
Abdulrahman Abbas; Hasan Qali	3 m synchronized springboard	287.10	16	—		did not advance	

== Swimming ==
Kuwait entered three swimmers.

Men

Athlete	Event	Heat		Semifinal		Final	
Athlete	Event	Time	Rank	Time	Rank	Time	Rank
Waleed Abdulrazzaq	100 m freestyle	50.67	54	did not advance			
Waleed Abdulrazzaq	50 m butterfly	24.32	42	did not advance			
Rashed Altarmoom	50 m breaststroke	29.70	45	did not advance			
Rashed Altarmoom	100 m breaststroke	1:04.19	46	did not advance			

Women

Athlete	Event	Heat		Semifinal		Final	
Athlete	Event	Time	Rank	Time	Rank	Time	Rank
Lara Dashti	50 m breaststroke	37.77	=50	did not advance			
Lara Dashti	100 m breaststroke	1:21.00	50	did not advance			
