= Kuwait at the 2023 World Aquatics Championships =

- Flag of Kuwait
- FINA code: KUW
- National federation: Kuwait Aquatics

in Fukuoka, Japan
- Competitors: 7 in 2 sports
- Medals: Gold 0 Silver 0 Bronze 0 Total 0

World Aquatics Championships appearances
- 1978; 1982; 1986; 1991; 1994; 1998; 2001; 2003; 2005; 2007; 2009; 2011; 2013; 2015; 2017; 2019; 2022; 2023; 2024

Kuwait competed at the 2023 World Aquatics Championships in Fukuoka, Japan from 14 to 30 July.

== Diving ==
Kuwait entered 1 diver.

Men

Athlete	Event	Preliminaries		Semifinals		Final	
Athlete	Event	Points	Rank	Points	Rank	Points	Rank
Abdulrahman Abbas	1 m springboard	201.80	63	—		Did not advance	
Abdulrahman Abbas	3 m springboard	215.55	67	Did not advance			

== Swimming ==
Kuwait entered 6 swimmers.

Men

Athlete	Event	Heat		Semifinal		Final	
Athlete	Event	Time	Rank	Time	Rank	Time	Rank
Waleed Abdulrazzaq	100 metre freestyle	51.15	58	Did not advance			
Waleed Abdulrazzaq	50 metre butterfly	24.30	50	Did not advance			
Sauod Alshamroukh	200 metre freestyle	1:54.77	50	Did not advance			
Sauod Alshamroukh	400 metre freestyle	4:04.95	39	—		Did not advance	
Ali Haidar	100 metre butterfly	59.94	65	Did not advance			
Ali Haidar	200 metre butterfly	2:13.97	37	Did not advance			
Mohamad Zubaid	50 metre backstroke	27.64	53	Did not advance			
Mohamad Zubaid	100 metre backstroke	59.56	55	Did not advance			

Women

Athlete	Event	Heat		Semifinal		Final	
Athlete	Event	Time	Rank	Time	Rank	Time	Rank
Lara Dashti	50 metre breaststroke	35.44	41	Did not advance			
Lara Dashti	100 metre breaststroke	1:19.29	55	Did not advance			
Saba Sultan	50 metre freestyle	30.59	85	Did not advance			
Saba Sultan	100 metre freestyle	1:05.49	67	Did not advance			
