= Mohamed Muthasim Adnan =

Maldivian swimmer (born 1997)

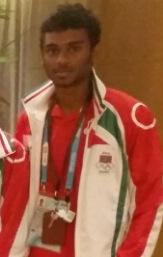
- Adnan in 2014

Personal information
- Born: 1997 (age 28–29)

Sport
- Sport: Swimming
- Strokes: Butterfly, freestyle

Mohamed Muthasim Adnan (born 1997) is a Maldivian swimmer. He competed in the 50 m, 100 m butterfly and 50 m freestyle at the 2012 FINA World Swimming Championships (25 m) and in the 50m freestyle, 50 m butterfly and 100 m individual medley events at the 2013 Asian Indoor and Martial Arts Games. Mohamed Muthasim Adnan also took part in the 50 m freestyle and 50 m butterfly events at the 2013 World Aquatics Championships.
