= Sergeý Krowýakow =

Turkmenistani swimmer

Personal information
- Born: April 1, 1991 (age 35) Ashgabat, Turkmen SSR

Sport
- Sport: Swimming

Sergeý Krowýakow (born April 1, 1991) is a Turkmenistani swimmer. At the 2012 Summer Olympics, he competed in the Men's 100 metre freestyle, finishing in 46th place overall in the heats, failing to qualify for the semifinals. He also competed in the 100 m event at the 2013 World Aquatics Championships.
