= Batsaikhany Dölgöön =

Mongolian swimmer (born 1986)

Personal information
- Nationality: Mongolian
- Born: 26 October 1986 (age 39) Erdenet, Mongolian People's Republic
- Height: 1.79 m (5 ft 10 in)
- Weight: 72 kg (159 lb)

Sport
- Country: Mongolia
- Sport: Swimming

Batsaikhany Dölgöön (born 26 October 1986) is a Mongolian Olympic swimmer. He represented his country at the 2016 Summer Olympics.
