= Yousef Al-Askari =

Kuwaiti swimmer

Personal information
- Full name: Yousef Al-Askari
- National team: Kuwait
- Born: 25 March 1994 (age 32) Kuwait City, Kuwait

Sport
- Sport: Swimming
- Strokes: Butterfly
- College team: University of Georgia

Yousef Al-Askari (born 25 March 1994) is a Kuwaiti swimmer. He competed in the 200 m butterfly event at the 2012 Summer Olympics and was eliminated during the heats; he was also the youngest swimmer to complete in the 2012 Olympics.

Al-Askari was a member of the Kuwaiti team that won a silver medal at the 2011 Pan Arab Games in the medley relay.
