= Faye Sultan =

Kuwaiti swimmer

Faye Sultan AlEssa
Personal information
- Nationality: Kuwaiti
- Born: 20 October 1994 (age 31) Kuwait
- Height: 1.82 m (6 ft 0 in)
- Weight: 67 kg (148 lb)

Sport
- Sport: Swimming
- Strokes: freestyle
- College team: Williams Ephs

Faye Sultan AlEssa (Arabic: فيّ سلطان; born 20 October 1994) is a Kuwaiti swimmer who competed in the Women's 50m Freestyle event at the 2012 Summer Olympics as the first female swimmer to represent Kuwait at the olympics. She attended high school at the American School of Kuwait, and graduated in 2012.

During the fall of 2012, Faye enrolled in the Williams College class of 2016. At Williams, she competed for the Williams Ephs women's swimming & diving team.

Faye also competed in the Women's 50m freestyle event at the 2016 Summer Olympics. She participated within the Independent Olympic Athletes team. She won her heat with a time of 26.86 seconds, finishing 54th out of 88 competitors.
