= Yang Jung-doo =

South Korean swimmer

Jungdoo Yang
Personal information
- Nationality: South Korea
- Born: 1991 (age 34–35) South Korea

Sport
- Sport: Swimming
- Strokes: Freestyle
Medal record
Representing South Korea
Asian Games
| Bronze medal – third place | 2014 Incheon | 50m butterfly |

Jungdoo Yang (born 1991) is a South Korean swimmer. On August 2, 2013, at the 2013 World Aquatics Championships in the Men's 50 metre freestyle event, Jungdoo Yang swam in the time of 22.48 to set the South Korean record.
