= Abbas Qali =

Kuwaiti swimmer (born 1992)

Personal information
- Native name: عباس قلي
- Full name: Abbas Qali
- National team: Kuwait
- Born: 11 October 1992 (age 33) Kuwait City, Kuwait
- Height: 177 cm (5 ft 10 in)
- Weight: 78 kg (172 lb)

Sport
- Sport: Swimming
- Strokes: Butterfly
- College team: University of Alabama

Abbas Qali (Arabic: عباس قلي; born 11 October 1992) is a Kuwaiti swimmer. He competed in the 100 m butterfly event at the Swimming at the 2015 World Aquatics Championships and was eliminated during the heats. He is a member of the University of Alabama swimming and diving team. He competed and scored in the 2015 SEC Championships in Auburn, Alabama. He holds the Kuwaiti record in the 50m Butterfly with a time of 25.06.

Abbas is the only Kuwaiti national to qualify for the Olympics in the 100m fly category, and the only Kuwaiti to participate in a 100m event at the Olympic Games. In seasonal competition he achieved a 54.16s result, making the Olympic B-Cut required to compete at the 2016 Rio de Janeiro Olympics in Brazil. He swam 54.63s in his heat, and did not advance to the semi-finals. Due to the IOC's suspension of Kuwait, Qali participated under the Olympic flag as an independent athlete.
