= First Meijin Tournament =

The First Meijin Tournament was a landmark go competition held in Japan in 1961 and 1962. Taking more than 18 months to complete, it was a round-robin (league) format event, featuring 13 top players. It arguably assembled the strongest field ever of players to compete in an all-play-all event. The structure, which produced in Fujisawa Hideyuki the first modern-era Meijin and initiated the titleholder system annual competition for that title, was never repeated.

Subsequent Meijin Leagues have been round-robins for nine players, followed by a best-of-seven challenger match. ( Crosstable at Gobase.) The result was in doubt until the last game was finished, on 5 August 1962; the first games had been on 18 January 1961. The sponsors had held back the key games in the scheduling, to maintain the tension. The result was in the end something few could have predicted.

Under the competition rules, komidashi was 5 points; if that made the game a jigo, it would be awarded to White. This has the same effect as komi of 5.5, except that as a tiebreak, White’s jigo wins were to count less than full wins. The final day featured the games between Fujisawa Hideyuki and Hashimoto Shoji, and Go Seigen and Sakata Eio. Fujisawa lost, and disappeared from the Nihon Ki-in building in Fukudaya, where the other game was in progress.

When the only result that could have made Fujisawa the winner, a jigo win with White for Go Seigen, actually happened, Fujisawa had to be sought out to inform him that he was after all the first Meijin since Honinbo Shusai had died in 1940. According to Go Review, Fujisawa had to be brought back from a bar where he was drowning his sorrows.

== Final standings ==
With each player having played 12 games, the results were:

- 9 wins, Fujisawa Hideyuki 9, winner on tie break, Go Seigen
- 8 wins, Sakata Eio
- 7 wins Hashimoto Shoji, Kitani Minoru, Handa Dogen
- 6 wins Fujisawa Hosai
- 5 wins Miyashita Shuyo, Sugiuchi Masao, Shimamura Toshihiro
- 4 wins Iwata Tatsuaki
- 3 wins Hashimoto Utaro, Takagawa Kaku

The 78 games were each played over two days, with ten hours each on the clock.
