= 1st Meijin =

Go tournament

The 1st Meijin was the first Meijin title sponsored by Asahi Shimbun. The tournament used a nine player round robin league system. Hideo Otake won the last Old Meijin title and his title was honored as holder of the Meijin title. Shuchi Kubouchi, Takeo Kajiwara and Norio Kudo qualified through the preliminary stages while Yoshio Ishida, Hideyuki Fujisawa, Eio Sakata, Utaro Hashimoto, Rin Kaiho, Toshiro Yamabe retained their places from the 14th Old Meijin. Yoshio Ishida won the league and challenged Otake for the title. Otake won the title in five games.

== Challenger league ==
Player	I.Y.	H.S.	E.S.	U.H.	R.K.	T.Y.	S.K.	T.K.	N.K.	Record	Notes
Ishida Yoshio	–	B+R	X	B+14	B+2	X	B+R	W+2	W+R	6–2	Challenger
Hideyuki Fujisawa	X	–	X	W+2	X	B+5	X	X	B+R	3–5	Eliminated
Eio Sakata	B+4	W+R	–	X	X	W+R	W+R	X	X	4–4	
Utaro Hashimoto	X	X	W+R	–	X	B+R	B+R	X	B+R	4–4	
Rin Kaiho	X	B+R	W+16	B+R	–	W+R	X	W+R	B+R	6–2	
Toshiro Yamabe	B+5	X	X	X	X	–	X	X	X	1–7	Eliminated
Shuchi Kubouchi	X	W+1	X	X	W+R	B+R	–	B+R	X	4–4	
Takeo Kajiwara	X	B+R	W+9	B+R	X	W+R	X	–	X	4–4	
Norio Kudo		X	X	B+1	X	X	B+R	W+R	B+6	4–4	Eliminated

== Finals ==
Player	1	2	3	4	5	6	7	T
Hideo Otake (Meijin)	B+R	W+5.5	B+2.5		B+R			4
Yoshio Ishida (Challenger)				B+2.5				1
