= Honinbo (competition) =

Oldest Go title in Japan

- Full name: Honinbo
- Started: 1941
- Honorary Winners: Takagawa Kaku; Sakata Eio; Ishida Yoshio; Cho Chikun; Iyama Yuta
- Sponsors: Mainichi Shimbun
- Prize money: 28 million yen
- Affiliation: Nihon Ki-in

The Honinbo (Japanese: 本因坊) is a Go competition and the oldest Go title in Japan. Sponsored by Mainichi Shimbun, the Honinbo pays out ¥28 million to the winner (since the 74th Honinbo in 2019).

== Rules ==
The holder of the title is challenged by whoever wins the round robin league. Players can get into the round robin league by going through many preliminary tournaments. Once there is a challenger to compete against the holder, the winner is decided through a best of seven match. The games are played over two days and each player is given eight hours of thinking time. If a player qualifies for the Honinbo league, they are automatically promoted to 7 dan. If that same player wins the league, a promotion to 8 dan is given. If that same player goes on to win the title, they are promoted to 9 dan, the highest rank.

== Past winners ==
Year	Winner	Score	Runner-up
1941	Riichi Sekiyama	3–3*	Shin Kato
1943	Utaro Hashimoto	2–0	Riichi Sekiyama
1945	Kaoru Iwamoto	3–3 (2–0)**	Utaro Hashimoto
1947	Kaoru Iwamoto	3–2	Minoru Kitani
1950	Utaro Hashimoto	4–0	Kaoru Iwamoto
1951	Utaro Hashimoto	4–3	Eio Sakata
1952	Kaku Takagawa	4–1	Utaro Hashimoto
1953	Kaku Takagawa	4–2	Minoru Kitani
1954	Kaku Takagawa	4–2	Masao Sugiuchi
1955	Kaku Takagawa	4–0	Toshihiro Shimamura
1956	Kaku Takagawa	4–2	Toshihiro Shimamura
1957	Kaku Takagawa	4–2	Hosai Fujisawa
1958	Kaku Takagawa	4–2	Masao Sugiuchi
1959	Kaku Takagawa	4–2	Minoru Kitani
1960	Kaku Takagawa	4–2	Hideyuki Fujisawa
1961	Eio Sakata	4–1	Kaku Takagawa
1962	Eio Sakata	4–1	Dogen Handa
1963	Eio Sakata	4–2	Kaku Takagawa
1964	Eio Sakata	4–0	Kaku Takagawa
1965	Eio Sakata	4–0	Toshiro Yamabe
1966	Eio Sakata	4–0	Hideyuki Fujisawa
1967	Eio Sakata	4–1	Rin Kaiho
1968	Rin Kaiho	4–3	Eio Sakata
1969	Rin Kaiho	4–2	Masao Kato
1970	Rin Kaiho	4–0	Eio Sakata
1971	Yoshio Ishida	4–2	Rin Kaiho
1972	Yoshio Ishida	4–3	Rin Kaiho
1973	Yoshio Ishida	4–0	Rin Kaiho
1974	Yoshio Ishida	4–3	Masaki Takemiya
1975	Yoshio Ishida	4–3	Eio Sakata
1976	Masaki Takemiya	4–1	Yoshio Ishida
1977	Masao Kato	4–1	Masaki Takemiya
1978	Masao Kato	4–3	Yoshio Ishida
1979	Masao Kato	4–1	Rin Kaiho
1980	Masaki Takemiya	4–1	Masao Kato
1981	Cho Chikun	4–2	Masaki Takemiya
1982	Cho Chikun	4–2	Koichi Kobayashi
1983	Rin Kaiho	4–3	Cho Chikun
1984	Rin Kaiho	4–1	Shuzo Awaji
1985	Masaki Takemiya	4–1	Rin Kaiho
1986	Masaki Takemiya	4–1	Hiroshi Yamashiro
1987	Masaki Takemiya	4–0	Hiroshi Yamashiro
1988	Masaki Takemiya	4–3	Hideo Otake
1989	Cho Chikun	4–0	Masaki Takemiya
1990	Cho Chikun	4–3	Koichi Kobayashi
1991	Cho Chikun	4–2	Koichi Kobayashi
1992	Cho Chikun	4–3	Koichi Kobayashi
1993	Cho Chikun	4–1	Hiroshi Yamashiro
1994	Cho Chikun	4–3	Satoshi Kataoka
1995	Cho Chikun	4–1	Masao Kato
1996	Cho Chikun	4–2	Ryu Shikun
1997	Cho Chikun	4–0	Masao Kato
1998	Cho Chikun	4–2	O Rissei
1999	Cho Sonjin	4–2	Cho Chikun
2000	O Meien	4–2	Cho Sonjin
2001	O Meien	4–3	Cho U
2002	Masao Kato	4–2	O Meien
2003	Cho U	4–2	Masao Kato
2004	Cho U	4–2	Norimoto Yoda
2005	Shinji Takao	4–1	Cho U
2006	Shinji Takao	4–2	Kimio Yamada
2007	Shinji Takao	4–1	Norimoto Yoda
2008	Naoki Hane	4–3	Shinji Takao
2009	Naoki Hane	4–2	Shinji Takao
2010	Keigo Yamashita	4–1	Naoki Hane
2011	Keigo Yamashita	4–3	Naoki Hane
2012	Yuta Iyama	4–3	Keigo Yamashita
2013	Yuta Iyama	4–3	Shinji Takao
2014	Yuta Iyama	4–1	Atsushi Ida
2015	Yuta Iyama	4–1	Keigo Yamashita
2016	Yuta Iyama	4–1	Shinji Takao
2017	Yuta Iyama	4–0	Katsuya Motoki
2018	Yuta Iyama	4–1	Keigo Yamashita
2019	Yuta Iyama	4–2	Rin Kono
2020	Yuta Iyama	4–1	Toramaru Shibano
2021	Yuta Iyama	4–3	Toramaru Shibano
2022	Yuta Iyama	4–0	Ryo Ichiriki
2023	Ryo Ichiriki	4–3	Yuta Iyama
2024	Ryo Ichiriki	3–0	Yo Seiki
2025	Ryo Ichiriki	3–2	Toramaru Shibano
2026	Kotaro Fukuoka	3–2	Ryo Ichiriki
