= Three crows =

Symbol or metaphor in several traditions

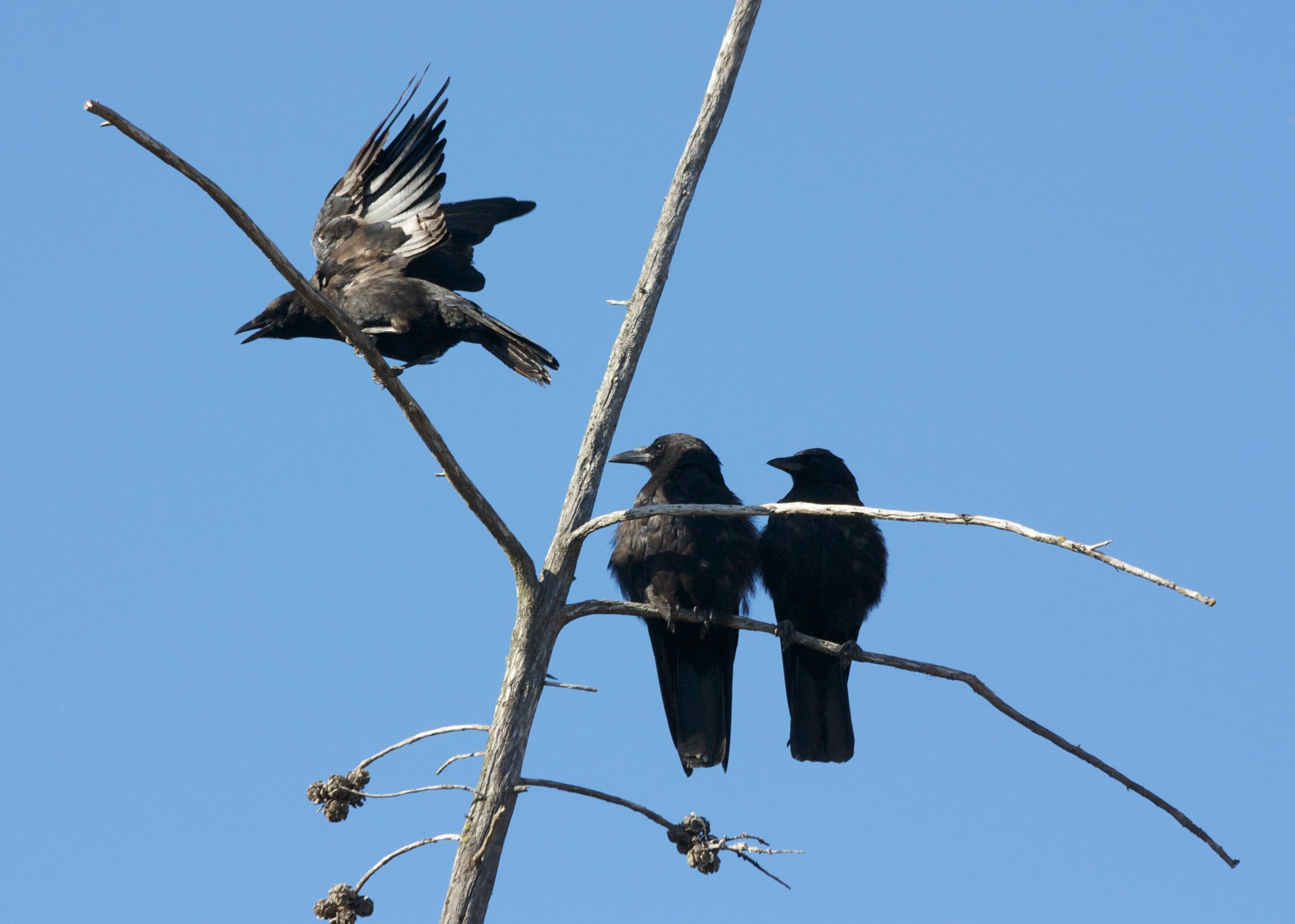
Three crows in a tree

Three crows are a symbol or metaphor in several traditions.

Crows, and especially ravens, often feature in European legends or mythology as portents or harbingers of doom or death, because of their dark plumage, unnerving calls, and tendency to eat carrion. According to Druid tradition they're also believed to bring upon new changes (death to one phase of your life and the birth to another).

== English folklore ==
A version of the three crows is probably based on the three ravens folk tale where three crows plot to devour the corpse of a dead knight. Then they are thwarted by the knight's hawk, hound and mistress.

Three crows are also often implicated in the parliament of crows where three crows preside over a larger number of crows and sit in judgment over the fate of another crow. The verdict sometimes results in a crow being set upon by all the other crows. This behavior and their tendency to show up at battlefields and the scenes of murders may be explain the collective term for crows as being a 'murder of crows'.

== Russian folklore ==
Three crows also refers to a tale of three crows (a father, mother and son crow) bothering the king.

== German folklore ==
There are also several references to the three crows in the German folklore. A number of these were included in the collection of stories by the Grimm brothers, Jacob and Wilhelm. There is, for instance, the legend of Faithful John, which told of three crows who warned faithful John about a series of misfortunes that would befall his king. The Grimms also recorded a story called Three Crows, which involved a tale that characterized the crows in the same light. In the story, a man called Conrad was robbed of his money and beaten hard so that he became blind. He also overheard three crows talking, which gave him information that significantly improved his life.

== Japanese culture ==
The Three Crows (三羽烏) may refer to the group of three Go players who are part of the triumvirate of certain eras in Go history. These players include Hideyuki Fujisawa, Keizo Suzuki, and Toshiro Yamabe (1940s). Although, since Suzuki died young, he was replaced by Takeo Kajiwara. Hashimoto Utaro, Murashima Yoshinori, and Shinohara Masami (1950s). Fujisawa Hosai, Takagawa Kaku, and Sakata Eio (1960s). Ishida Yoshio, Kato Masao and Takemiya Masaki (Kitani dojo). In Japanese the term is used of triumvirates of other fields as well, for example sumo and baseball. In the Kwantung Army of Imperial Japan for instance, the Three Crows refer to the Triumvirate of Army War College 24th class graduate Kenji Doihara, Army War College 28th class graduate Itagaki Seishiro and Army War College 30th class Military Sword Club member Kanji Ishiwara: the main masterminds of the Mukden Incident and the subsequent invasion of China.

== Modern usage ==
Stock market investors sometimes refer to a three crows as a pattern of successive declining stock prices over three days often identified by overlapping candlestick patterns. Three crows are often seen as a warning of a period of powerful selling pressure on the stock market. There are those who recommend, however, that investors should not be alarmed since an identical three crow pattern in a primary uptrend will likely break out downward but reverse in a few days.

It's also used "Three Craws", which is a traditional Scottish children's song about three crows sitting on a wall in a cold and frosty morning (or more precisely "three craws, sat on a wa" in Scottish, hence the song's name and concept).
