= Dai-ichi (Go competition) =

Mid-to-late 20th century Go competition in Japan

The Dai-ichi was a Go competition. The Dai-ichi ran from 1959 to 1975, although before 1970 only players from the Nihon Ki-in could compete. From 1970 and on, players from all over Japan could compete. After 1975, it became the Gosei tournament.

== Past Winners and Runners-up ==
=== Nihon Ki-in Dai-ichi (Nihon Ki-in First Place) ===
	Year	Winner	Score	Runner-up
1.	1959	Fujisawa Hideyuki	2-0	Miyashita Shuyo
2.	1961	Sakata Eio	2-1	Takagawa Kaku
3.	1963	Sakata Eio	2-0	Takagawa Kaku
4.	1964	Sakata Eio	2-0	Ohira Shuzo
5.	1965	Sakata Eio	2-1	Ohira Shuzo
6.	1967	Otake Hideo	2-1	Takagawa Kaku
7.	1968	Otake Hideo	2-1	Ohira Shuzo

=== Zen Nihon Dai-ichi (All Japan First Place) ===
	Year	Winner	Score	Runner-up
1.	1970	Otake Hideo	2-1	Fujisawa Shuko
2.	1971	Otake Hideo	2-0	Kato Masao
3.	1973	Otake Hideo	2-0	Kajiwara Takeo
4.	1974	Otake Hideo	2-0	Fujisawa Shuko
5.	1975	Otake Hideo	2-1	Kudo Norio

== See also ==
- List of professional Go tournaments
