= 60th Ōza =

The 60th Oza was one of the main Go tournaments in 2012. The initial tournament began on 26 April 2012 and concluded on 13 September 2012 When Iyama Yuta went undefeated. Yuta went on to challenge then Oza title holder, Cho U, defeating him in three rounds between 25 October 2012 and 22 November 2012.

== Challenger tournament ==
Round of 16
26 April
Mimura Yomoyasu (B)	L
Imamura Toshiya (W)	W+R
10 May
Cho Chikun (B)	L
Yuki Satoshi (W)	W+R
17 May
Yamada Kimio (B)	B+1.5
Kiyonari Tetsuya (W)	L
3 May
Iyama Yuta (B)	B+R
Kono Rin (W)	L
10 May
Sakai Hideyuki (W)	W+5.5
Mochizuki Kenichi (B)	L
14 June
Tsuruyama Atsushi (W)	W+11.5
Yamashita Keigo (B)	L
3 May
Kim Sujun (W)	W+R
Yoda Norimoto (B)	L
5 July
Hane Naoki (B)	B+R
Ri Ishu (W)	L

Quarter-finals
14 June
Imamura Toshiya (W)	L
Yuki Satoshi (B)	B+6.5
30 July
Yamada Kimio (W)	L
Iyama Yuta (B)	B+R
19 July
Sakai Hideyuki (W)	L
Tsuruyama Atsushi (B)	B+25.5
26 July
Kim Sujun (W)	L
Hane Naoki (B)	B+R

Semi-finals
11 August
Yuki Satoshi (B)	L
Iyama Yuta (W)	W+R
20 August
Tsuruyama Atsushi (B)	L
Hane Naoki (W)	W+R

Final
13 September
Hane Naoki (B)	L
Iyama Yuta (W)	W+R

== Finals ==
Player	Round 1	Round 2	Round 3	Round 4	Round 5
Date & Location	25 October, Taipei, Taiwan	27 October, Taipei Taiwan	22 November, Kobe, Japan	3 December, Izunokuni, Japan	13 December, Yokohama, Japan
Cho U (Oza)					
Yuta Iyama (Honinbo)	W+7.5	B+R	W+R		

== See also ==
- List of professional Go tournaments
- Go players
- List of Go organizations
