= Shuzo Ohira =

Personal information
- Native name: 大平修三 (Japanese)
- Full name: Shuzo Ohira
- Born: March 16, 1930 Gifu, Japan
- Died: December 11, 1998 (aged 68)

Sport
- Turned pro: 1947
- Teacher: Minoru Kitani
- Rank: 9 dan

Shuzo Ohira (大平修三, Ōhira Shūzō; 1930–1998) was a professional Go player.

== Biography ==
Ohira was born in Gifu, Japan. Taken under the wing of the prolific Kitani Minoru in 1941, Ohira quickly rose in rank. By 1947, he had obtained professional 1 dan, being promoted to 2 dan in the same year. By 1955 he was 6 dan, and by 1963 he reached the peak of 9 dan. His first big break came in 1966 when he won the Nihon Ki-in Championship, and defended it for 3 years. Along with Takagawa Kaku, Sakata Eio, and Ishida Yoshio, Ohira was the only player to win this title. In 1977, he won his first major title by winning the Hayago Championship. Ten years later her set a new record of successive wins, with 17. During his time, he was an active player in the Meijin and Honinbo leagues. He lived in Yokohama, Japan before he died.

== Titles & runners-up ==
Title	Years Held
(Japan) Hayago Championship	1977
(Japan) Nihon Ki-in Championship	1966–1969

Title	Years Lost
(Japan) Tengen	1975
(Japan) NHK Cup	1978
(Japan) Hayago Championship	1969
(Japan) IBM Cup	1990
