= Tōno Hiroaki =

Japanese Go player (1939–2025)

Personal information
- Native name: 東野弘昭 (Japanese)
- Full name: Tōno Hiroaki
- Born: August 22, 1939 Manchukuo
- Died: June 16, 2025 (aged 85) Suita, Osaka Prefecture, Japan

Sport
- Turned pro: 1951
- Teacher: Utaro Hashimoto
- Rank: 9 dan
- Affiliation: Kansai Ki-in

Tōno Hiroaki (東野 弘昭, Tōno Hiroaki; August 22, 1939 – June 16, 2025) was a Japanese professional Go player. He was born in Japanese-occupied Manchukuo, and was raised in Ehime Prefecture.

== Biography ==
Tōno became a professional in 1951. In 1970, he became a 9 dan. He was affiliated with the Kansai Ki-in. He died of heart failure at a hospital in Suita, on June 16, 2025, at the age of 85.

== Title and runners-up ==
Title	Years Held
Current	1
(Japan) NHK Cup	1979
Defunct	2
(Japan) Kansai Ki-in Championship	1987, 1989
(Japan) Hayago Meijin	1975

Title	Years Lost
Current	1
(Japan) NHK Cup	1999
