= Ōza (Go) =

- Full name: Ōza
- Started: 1953
- Honorary Winners: Masao Kato
- Sponsors: The Nikkei
- Prize money: ¥14 million
- Affiliation: Nihon Ki-in

Ōza (王座; "throne") is the second oldest of the seven big titles in Japanese professional Go. The tournament is organised by the Japanese Nihon Ki-in and sponsored by the Nihon Keizai Shinbun, also known as The Nikkei. The six other big Go titles include the Kisei, Meijin, Honinbo, Judan, Tengen, and the Gosei.

As of 2026, there have been 73 iterations of the Ozā tournament since 1953. The winner's prize is currently ¥14,000,000, ranking it fourth largest among the big seven. All professional players of the Nihon Ki-in and Kansai Ki-in can participate in the Ozā.

== Outline ==
The Ozā has a similar format to other big Go tournaments in Japan. Since the 16th Ozā in 1968, the winner of a preliminary tournament, played in single knockout, advances to play a best-of-five match against the previous year's title holder. Previously, the tournament format was a best-of-three match between two final players from the knockout rounds.

== Past winners ==
Edition	Year	Winner	Score	Runner-up
1st	1953	Utaro Hashimoto	1–0	Nobuaki Maeda
2nd	1954	Kaku Takagawa	2–1	Hidehiro Miyashita
3rd	1955	Utaro Hashimoto	2–1	Toshihiro Shimamura
4th	1956	Utaro Hashimoto	2–0	Eio Sakata
5th	1957	Toshihiro Shimamura	2–0	Dogen Handa
6th	1958	Hosai Fujisawa	2–0	Dogen Handa
7th	1959	Shoji Hashimoto	2–0	Toshiro Yamabe
8th	1960	Dogen Handa	2–0	Hidehiro Miyashita
9th	1961	Eio Sakata	2–1	Kaku Takagawa
10th	1962	Hidehiro Miyashita	2–0	Katsuji Kada
11th	1963	Eio Sakata	2–0	Hosai Fujisawa
12th	1964	Eio Sakata	2–0	Takeo Kajiwara
13th	1965	Dogen Handa	2–0	Ichigen Okubo
14th	1966	Eio Sakata	2–1	Rin Kaiho
15th	1967	Hideyuki Fujisawa	2–0	Shoji Hashimoto
16th	1968	Hideyuki Fujisawa	2–0	Eio Sakata
17th	1969	Hideyuki Fujisawa	2–0	Hideo Otake
18th	1970	Eio Sakata	2–0	Hideyuki Fujisawa
19th	1971	Eio Sakata	2–0	Shoji Hashimoto
20th	1972	Eio Sakata	2–1	Utaro Hashimoto
21st	1973	Rin Kaiho	2–1	Eio Sakata
22nd	1974	Yoshio Ishida	2–1	Rin Kaiho
23rd	1975	Hideo Otake	2–0	Yoshio Ishida
24th	1976	Cho Chikun	2–1	Hideo Otake
25th	1977	Norio Kudo	2–0	Cho Chikun
26th	1978	Yoshio Ishida	2–1	Norio Kudo
27th	1979	Masao Kato	2–0	Yoshio Ishida
28th	1980	Masao Kato	2–0	Yoshio Ishida
29th	1981	Shoji Hashimoto	2–1	Masao Kato
30th	1982	Masao Kato	2–0	Shoji Hashimoto
31st	1983	Masao Kato	2–0	Hideo Otake
32nd	1984	Masao Kato	3–0	Hiroshi Yamashiro
33rd	1985	Masao Kato	3–0	Koichi Kobayashi
34th	1986	Masao Kato	3–1	Rin Kaiho
35th	1987	Masao Kato	3–1	Cho Chikun
36th	1988	Masao Kato	3–0	Masaki Takemiya
37th	1989	Masao Kato	3–1	Yasumasa Hane
38th	1990	Yasumasa Hane	3–2	Masao Kato
39th	1991	Hideyuki Fujisawa	3–1	Yasumasa Hane
40th	1992	Hideyuki Fujisawa	3–2	Koichi Kobayashi
41st	1993	Masao Kato	3–0	Hideyuki Fujisawa
42nd	1994	Cho Chikun	3–2	Masao Kato
43rd	1995	O Rissei	3–0	Cho Chikun
44th	1996	Ryu Shikun	3–0	O Rissei
45th	1997	Kimio Yamada	3–1	Ryu Shikun
46th	1998	O Rissei	3–0	Kimio Yamada
47th	1999	O Rissei	3–1	Cho Chikun
48th	2000	O Rissei	3–1	Cho Chikun
49th	2001	Cho Chikun	3–0	O Rissei
50th	2002	O Meien	3–2	Cho Chikun
51st	2003	Cho U	3–1	O Meien
52nd	2004	Cho U	3–1	Keigo Yamashita
53rd	2005	Cho U	3–0	Keigo Yamashita
54th	2006	Keigo Yamashita	3–1	Cho U
55th	2007	Keigo Yamashita	3–1	Toshiya Imamura
56th	2008	Cho U	3–1	Keigo Yamashita
57th	2009	Cho U	3–0	Kimio Yamada
58th	2010	Cho U	3–0	Kimio Yamada
59th	2011	Cho U	3–0	Hane Naoki
60th	2012	Yuta Iyama	3–0	Cho U
61st	2013	Yuta Iyama	3–1	Cho U
62nd	2014	Daisuke Murakawa	3–2	Yuta Iyama
63rd	2015	Yuta Iyama	3–0	Daisuke Murakawa
64th	2016	Yuta Iyama	3–0	Yo Seiki
65th	2017	Yuta Iyama	3–0	Ryo Ichiriki
66th	2018	Yuta Iyama	3–2	Ryo Ichiriki
67th	2019	Shibano Toramaru	3–1	Yuta Iyama
68th	2020	Shibano Toramaru	3–1	Kyo Kagen (Hsu Chia Yuan)
69th	2021	Yuta Iyama	3–2	Shibano Toramaru
70th	2022	Yuta Iyama	3–0	Yo Seiki
71st	2023	Yuta Iyama	3–2	Yo Seiki
72nd	2024	Yuta Iyama	3–1	Shibano Toramaru
73rd	2025	Ryo Ichiriki	3–1	Yuta Iyama

== See also ==
- Ōza (shogi)
