= Miyamoto Naoki =

Japanese Go player

Personal information
- Native name: 宮本 直毅 (Japanese)
- Full name: Miyamoto Naoki
- Born: December 9, 1934 Hyōgo, Japan
- Died: October 26, 2012 (aged 77)

Sport
- Turned pro: 1950
- Teacher: Utaro Hashimoto
- Rank: 9 dan
- Affiliation: Kansai Ki-in

Miyamoto Naoki (宮本 直毅, Miyamoto Naoki; December 9, 1934 – October 26, 2012) was a professional Go player.

== Biography ==
Miyamoto became a professional in 1950 for the Kansai Ki-in. He was promoted to 9 dan in 1969. He is famous for the books he has written. Oyama Kunio, Ushinohama Satsuo and Matsumura Osamu are his disciples.

== Titles ==
Title	Years Held
Current	2
(Japan) Kansai Ki-in Championship	1959, 1968
