= Kunihisa Honda =

Japanese Go player

Personal information
- Native name: 本田邦久 (Japanese)
- Full name: Kunihisa Honda
- Born: June 15, 1945 (age 81) Ishikawa, Japan

Sport
- Teacher: Utaro Hashimoto
- Rank: 9 dan
- Affiliation: Kansai Ki-in

Kunihisa Honda (本田邦久, Honda Kunihisa; born June 15, 1945) is a professional Go player.

== Biography ==
Honda became a professional in 1961. He was promoted to 9 dan in 1973. He won the Kansai Ki-in's Oteai four times. He also visited China twice, in 1973 and 1985 for Go related business.

== Titles & runners-up ==
Title	Years Held
Current	4
(Japan) NHK Cup	1984
(Japan) KK Championship	1975, 1976, 2001

Title	Years Lost
Current	1
(Japan) NHK Cup	1998
