= Kunihisa =

- Gender: Male

Origin
- Origin: Japanese
- Meaning: Different meanings depending on the kanji used

Kunihisa (written 邦久 or 国久) is a masculine Japanese given name. Notable people with the name include:

- Amago Kunihisa (尼子 国久; 1492–1554), Japanese daimyō
- Kunihisa Honda (本田 邦久; born 1945), Japanese Go player
- Kunihisa Sugishima (杉島 邦久; born 1959), Japanese anime director
