= Yasuo Koyama =

Japanese Go player

Personal information
- Native name: 小山靖男 (Japanese)
- Full name: Yasuo Koyama
- Born: April 27, 1937 Okayama, Japan
- Died: 2000

Sport
- Rank: 9 dan

Yasuo Koyama (小山靖男, Koyama Yasuo; April 27, 1937 - September 5, 2000) was a professional Go player.

== Biography ==
Koyama was a disciple of Riichi Sekiyama. He became a 9-dan in 1971. He played in the Kansai Ki-in. His disciple was Yahata Koichi.

== Titles ==
Title	Years Held
Current	1
(Japan) Kansai Ki-in Championship	1962
