= Murakawa Daisuke =

Japanese Go player (born 1990)

Personal information
- Native name: 村川大介 (Japanese)
- Full name: Murakawa Daisuke
- Born: December 14, 1990 (age 35) Hyōgo, Japan

Sport
- Turned pro: 2002
- Teacher: Naoki Moriyama
- Rank: 9 dan
- Affiliation: Kansai Ki-in

Murakawa Daisuke (村川大介, Murakawa Daisuke; born December 14, 1990) is a professional Go player.

== Biography ==
Murakawa was still just a 6th grader when he became a professional Go player at the Kansai Ki-in. He was only one month older than Iyama Yuta, making him the second youngest professional in Japan. This also made him the youngest Kansai Ki-in professional, edging out Yuki Satoshi by a small margin. Murakawa is the youngest ever tsumego (life and death) problem creator and number created. His rival is Iyama Yuta from the Nihon Ki-in whom he defeated in 2014 to become the Oza title holder. Murakawa is currently 9 dan. He has also won the Nagai award.

== Titles and runners-up ==
Domestic
Title	Wins	Runners-up
Judan	1 (2019)	
Oza	1 (2014)	
Agon Cup	1 (2013)	
Kansai Ki-in Championship	1 (2010)	2 (2011-2012)
Shinjin-O	1 (2011)	
Total	5	2
Continental
Total	0	0
International
Total	0	0
Career total
Total	5	2
