= Takeo Kajiwara =

Japanese Go player

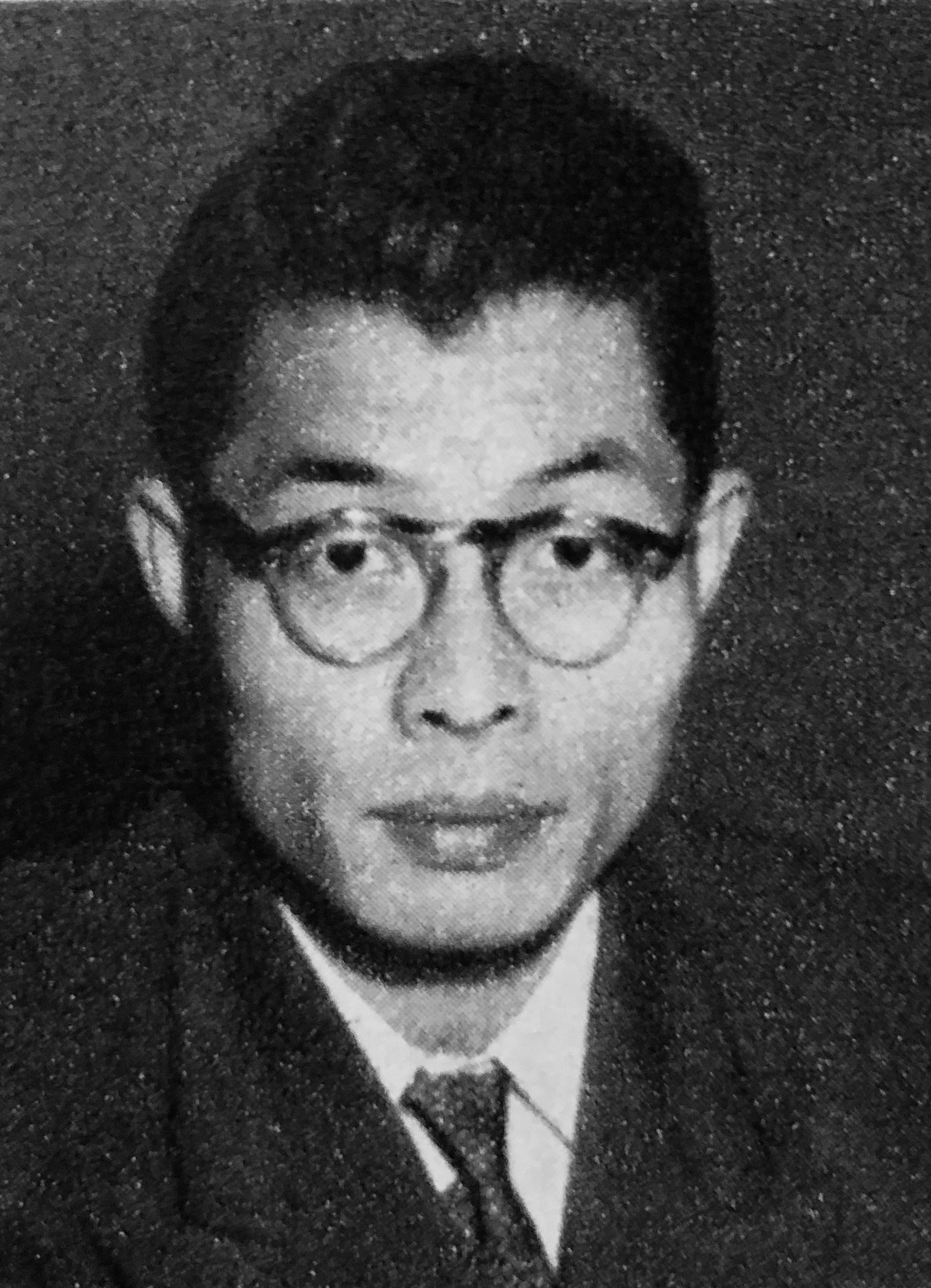
- Takeo Kajiwara in 1954

Personal information
- Native name: 梶原武雄 (Japanese)
- Full name: Takeo Kajiwara
- Born: February 25, 1923 Sado, Niigata, Japan
- Died: November 28, 2009 (aged 86)

Sport
- Turned pro: 1937
- Teacher: Riichi Sekiyama
- Rank: 9 dan
- Affiliation: Nihon Ki-in

Takeo Kajiwara (梶原 武雄, Kajiwara Takeo; February 25, 1923 – November 28, 2009) was a professional Go player.

== Biography ==
Kajiwara studied under Riichi Sekiyama 9 dan until Kajiwara became a 1 dan in the autumn of 1937. He was promoted to 9 dan in 1965. Kajiwara left the Nihon Ki-in in 1947 with seven other professionals to create a rival organization, the Igo Shinsha (囲碁新社). He returned the following year. He challenged for the Oza title, the sixth largest in Japan, in 1964. A year later in 1965, he led a group of players to China, where he helped develop the Chinese fuseki. He is known for his famous "drilling tactics" and intuitive flair. He, along with Hideyuki Fujisawa and Toshiro Yamabe made up the group of "three crows" (triumvirate) of the post-war generation. Kajiwara taught the apprentices in the Kitani Dojo for an extended period when Kitani Minoru was incapacitated by illness. He thus played an important role in the development of the dominant Kitani-school players in the last quarter of the 20th century. In tournament play he reached the final of the 8th Asahi Pro Best Ten and played in the 1976, 1977, and 1978 Meijin leagues. He also tied for first place in the 1977 Gosei league.
