= Sunao =

- Gender: Male

Origin
- Origin: Japanese
- Meaning: Different meanings depending on the kanji used

Sunao (written: 直, 淳, 愿, 順, 須直, 直男 or すなお in hiragana) is a masculine Japanese given name. Notable people with the name include:

- Sunao Hari (針 すなお; born 1933), Japanese manga artist
- Sunao Hozaki (保崎 淳; born 1987), Japanese footballer
- Sunao Ishiharada (石原田 愿; born 1915), Japanese swimmer
- Sunao Katabuchi (片渕 須直; born 1960), Japanese anime director
- Sunao Sato (佐藤 直男; 1924–2004), Japanese Go player
- Sunao Sonoda (1914–1984), Japanese politician
- Sunao Tawara (田原 淳; 1873–1952), Japanese pathologist
- Sunao Yoshida (吉田 直; 1969–2004), pen-name of Sunao Matsumoto, Japanese writer
