= Kansai Ki-in Championship =

The Kansai Ki-in Championship (Japanese: 関西棋院第一位決定戦) is a Japanese Go competition.

== Outline ==
The original Kansai Ki-In Championship ran from 1957 to 1975. It was merged with the Nihon Ki-In Championship to form the Tengen. A new Kansai Ki-In Championship tournament replaced the old. The tournament is sponsored by Sanyo Shimbun.

== Past winners ==
Player	Years Held
Sato Sunao	1957, 1964, 1981
Handa Dogen	1958, 1960, 1961
Miyamoto Naoki	1959
Koyama Yasuo	1962
Kubouchi Shuchi	1963
Hashimoto Shoji	1965–1967, 1970–1974, 1978, 1979, 1988, 1990
Hashimoto Utaro	1968, 1969, 1980
Honda Kunihisa	1975, 1976, 2001
Sekiyama Toshio	1977, 1991
Oyama Kunio	1982
Sonoda Yuichi	1983, 1984, 1995
Ushinohama Satsuo	1985
Miyamoto Yoshihisa	1986
Tono Hiroaki	1987, 1989
Kiyonari Tetsuya	1992, 2004
Shiraishi Yutaka	1993
Imamura Toshiya	1994, 1998, 2000, 2002
Yuki Satoshi	1996, 2006–2009, 2014–2016
Moriyama Naoki	1999
Sakai Hideyuki	2003, 2011–2013
Yokota Shigeaki	2005
Murakawa Daisuke	2010
Yo Seiki	2017–2025
