= Asahi Pro Best Ten =

Japanese Go competition

- Full name: Asahi Pro Best Ten
- Started: 1964
- Defunct: 1975
- Sponsors: Asahi Shimbun
- Affiliation: Nihon Ki-in

The Asahi Pro Best Ten (プロ十傑戦) was a Japanese Go competition held annually from 1964 until 1975, a total of 12 times. It was sponsored by The Asahi Shimbun. In 1976, the Asahi Shimbun became the sponsor of the Meijin tournament and discontinued the Pro Best Ten.

== Outline ==
The tournament consisted of 20 players. The format was a knockout. The 20 players were reduced to 10, with the place for number 1 coming down to a best-of-three match.

== Winners and runners-up ==
Pro Best Ten
No.	Year	Winner	Score	Runner-up
1	1964	Sakata Eio	2–0	Takagawa Shukaku
2	1965	Fujisawa Hideyuki	2–1	Takagawa Shukaku
3	1966	Rin Kaiho	2–0	Takagawa Shukaku
4	1967	Sakata Eio	2–0	Takagawa Shukaku
5	1968	Fujisawa Hideyuki	2–1	Sakata Eio
6	1969	Sakata Eio	2–0	Rin Kaiho
7	1970	Hashimoto Utaro	3–0	Kato Masao
8	1971	Ishida Yoshio	3–2	Kajiwara Takeo
9	1972	Ishida Yoshio	3–1	Iwata Tatsuaki
10	1973	Rin Kaiho	3–1	Hashimoto Utaro
11	1974	Rin Kaiho	3–0	Takemiya Masaki
12	1975	Cho Chikun	3–0	Kato Masao
