= NHK Cup (Go) =

The NHK Cup (Go), or as it is more commonly known the NHK Cup TV Go Tournament (NHK杯テレビ囲碁トーナメント, enu eichi kei hai terebi igo tōnamento), is a professional Go tournament (Go competition) organized by the Japan Go Association (Nihon Ki-in) and sponsored by the Japan Broadcasting Corporation (NHK). The tournament lasts roughly one year from April to the following March. Tournament games are televised each Sunday from 12:30 to 14:00 (JST) on NHK Educational TV (NHK-E) and live commentary and analysis is provided by two commentators (Go professionals): A host (司会) (typically a female Go professional) who serves in that role for the entire tournament and a guest commentator (大盤解説者) to provide detailed analysis. Post-game analysis involving the two players and the two commentators takes place once the game has ended (broadcast time permitting). This year (2023) marks the 71st time the tournament has been held and the host is Shiho Hoshiai 2P. Prior to 1963, the tournament was broadcast on the radio.

== Tournament Format ==
The tournament is a single-elimination tournament with 50 Japanese Go Association professionals (棋士) competing for the title of NHK Cup Champion (NHK杯選手権者). A fixed number of spots in the main tournament are reserved for "seeded players" (higher ranked players, existing title holders, those with superior win loss records, etc.) while the remaining spots are decided through a series of preliminary tournaments. Once the final 50 players have been determined, they are divided into two blocks (Block A and Block B) of 25 players each.

The tournament consists of 6 rounds: the first 5 rounds determine the winner of each block、and then the two block winners meet in Round 6 for the tournament championship. The reigning title holder and runner-up as well as a select number of other players are awarded first round byes, thus actually only needing to win 5 games in order to win the tournament. The basic time control for each game is 30 seconds per move. In addition, each player has 10 periods of extra thinking time, 1 minute each.

The winner of the tournament receives 5,000,000 Yen (approximately US$48,000) in prize money, in addition to the NHK Cup.

== Past winners ==
The final games of each Cup fall into the following year. So the first NHK Cup, for example, was officially held in 1953, but decided in 1954.

Winners (by number of titles)
| Player | Titles | Year(s) Won |
|---|---|---|
| Sakata Eio | 11 | 1956 - 1958, 1960, 1961, 1963, 1964, 1971, 1975, 1976, 1981 |
| Ōtake Hideo | 5 | 1967, 1970, 1972, 1974, 1993 |
| Yoda Norimoto | 5 | 1990, 1992, 1997, 1998, 1999 |
| Yuki Satoshi | 5 | 2008, 2009, 2011, 2012, 2013 |
| Cho Chikun | 4 | 1982, 1991, 1995, 2006 |
| Cho U | 4 | 2001, 2004, 2007, 2015 |
| Ichiriki Ryo | 4 | 2018, 2020, 2021, 2023 |
| Iyama Yuta | 4 | 2016, 2017, 2019, 2025 |
| Ishida Yoshio | 3 | 1986, 1989, 2000 |
| Rin Kaiho | 3 | 1969, 1973, 1977 |
| Hashimoto Shōji | 3 | 1966, 1979, 1984 |
| Fujisawa Hideyuki | 2 | 1968, 1980 |
| Hashimoto Utarō | 2 | 1955, 1962 |
| Kobayashi Kōichi | 2 | 1985, 2003 |
| Hane Naoki | 1 | 2005 |
| Honda Kunihisa | 1 | 1983 |
| Ida Atsushi | 1 | 2014 |
| Iwamoto Kaoru | 1 | 1954 |
| Katō Masao | 1 | 1987 |
| Kitani Minoru | 1 | 1959 |
| Kobayashi Satoru | 1 | 1994 |
| Mimura Tomoyasu | 1 | 2002 |
| Ō Rissei | 1 | 1996 |
| Takagawa Shūkaku | 1 | 1965 |
| Takemiya Masaki | 1 | 1988 |
| Tōno Hiroaki | 1 | 1978 |
| Shimamura Toshihiro | 1 | 1953 |
| Yamada Kimio | 1 | 2010 |
| Seki Kotaro | 1 | 2022 |
| Yo Seiki | 1 | 2024 |

Winners (in chronological order)
| # | Year | Winner | Runner-up |
|---|---|---|---|
| 1. | 1953 | Shimamura Toshihiro | Takagawa Kaku |
| 2. | 1954 | Iwamoto Kaoru | Fujisawa Hôsai |
| 3. | 1955 | Hashimoto Utarō | Sakata Eio |
| 4. | 1956 | Sakata Eio | Fujisawa Hôsai |
| 5. | 1957 | Sakata Eio | Kitani Minoru |
| 6. | 1958 | Sakata Eio | Takagawa Kaku |
| 7. | 1959 | Kitani Minoru | Fujisawa Hôsai |
| 8. | 1960 | Sakata Eio | Kitani Minoru |
| 9. | 1961 | Sakata Eio | Hashimoto Utarō |
| 10. | 1962 | Hashimoto Utarō | Fujisawa Hideyuki |
| 11. | 1963 | Sakata Eio | Fujisawa Hideyuki |
| 12. | 1964 | Sakata Eio | Miyashita Hideyuki |
| 13. | 1965 | Takagawa Kaku | Fujisawa Hideyuki |
| 14. | 1966 | Hashimoto Shōji | Fujisawa Hôsai |
| 15. | 1967 | Ōtake Hideo | Hashimoto Shōji |
| 16. | 1968 | Fujisawa Hideyuki | Fujisawa Hôsai |
| 17. | 1969 | Rin Kaiho | Sakata Eio |
| 18. | 1970 | Ōtake Hideo | Ishida Yoshio |
| 19. | 1971 | Sakata Eio | Ōtake Hideo |
| 20. | 1972 | Ōtake Hideo | Hashimoto Shōji |
| 21. | 1973 | Rin Kaiho | Katô Masao |
| 22. | 1974 | Ōtake Hideo | Takemiya Masaki |
| 23. | 1975 | Sakata Eio | Go Seigen |
| 24. | 1976 | Sakata Eio | Takemiya Masaki |
| 25. | 1977 | Rin Kaiho | Ôhira Shûzô |
| 26. | 1978 | Tōno Hiroaki | Takagi Shôichi |
| 27. | 1979 | Hashimoto Shōji | Cho Chikun |
| 28. | 1980 | Fujisawa Hideyuki | Takagi Shôichi |
| 29. | 1981 | Sakata Eio | Sugiuchi Masao |
| 30. | 1982 | Cho Chikun | Ōtake Hideo |
| 31. | 1983 | Honda Kunihisa | Takemiya Masaki |
| 32. | 1984 | Hashimoto Shōji | Ishida Yoshio |
| 33. | 1985 | Kobayashi Kōichi | Takemiya Masaki |
| 34. | 1986 | Ishida Yoshio | Rin Kaihô |
| 35. | 1987 | Katō Masao | O Rissei |
| 36. | 1988 | Takemiya Masaki | Kobayashi Satoru |
| 37. | 1989 | Ishida Yoshio | Ōtake Hideo |
| 38. | 1990 | Yoda Norimoto | O Meien |
| 39. | 1991 | Cho Chikun | Ô Rissei |
| 40. | 1992 | Yoda Norimoto | Katô Masao |
| 41. | 1993 | Ōtake Hideo | Katô Masao |
| 42. | 1994 | Kobayashi Satoru | Kiyonari Tetsuya |
| 43. | 1995 | Cho Chikun | Kobayashi Satoru |
| 44. | 1996 | Ō Rissei | Kobayashi Kôichi |
| 45. | 1997 | Yoda Norimoto | Honda Kunihisa |
| 46. | 1998 | Yoda Norimoto | Tôno Hiroaki |
| 47. | 1999 | Yoda Norimoto | Imamura Toshiya |
| 48. | 2000 | Ishida Yoshio | Cho Chikun |
| 49. | 2001 | Cho U | Hane Naoki |
| 50. | 2002 | Mimura Tomoyasu | Ô Rissei |
| 51. | 2003 | Kobayashi Kōichi | Cho Chikun |
| 52. | 2004 | Cho U | Yoda Norimoto |
| 53. | 2005 | Hane Naoki | Imamura Toshiya |
| 54. | 2006 | Cho Chikun | Yûki Satoshi |
| 55. | 2007 | Cho U | Cho Chikun |
| 56. | 2008 | Yuki Satoshi | Takemiya Masaki |
| 57. | 2009 | Yuki Satoshi | Iyama Yûta |
| 58. | 2010 | Yamada Kimio | Yoda Norimoto |
| 59. | 2011 | Yuki Satoshi | Hane Naoki |
| 60. | 2012 | Yuki Satoshi | Iyama Yûta |
| 61. | 2013 | Yuki Satoshi | Kôno Rin |
| 62. | 2014 | Ida Atsushi | Ichiriki Ryo |
| 63. | 2015 | Cho U | Terayama Rei |
| 64. | 2016 | Iyama Yuta | Ichiriki Ryo |
| 65. | 2017 | Iyama Yuta | Shida Tatsuya |
| 66. | 2018 | Ichiriki Ryo | Iyama Yuta |
| 67. | 2019 | Iyama Yuta | Ichiriki Ryo |
| 68. | 2020 | Ichiriki Ryo | Yo Seiki |
| 69. | 2021 | Ichiriki Ryo | Shinji Takao |
| 70. | 2022 | Seki Kotaro | Ichiriki Ryo |
| 71. | 2023 | Ichiriki Ryo | Shibano Toramaru |
| 72. | 2024 | Yo Seiki | Iyama Yuta |
| 73. | 2025 | Iyama Yuta | Yo Seiki |

== Lifetime Champions ==
The title of "Lifetime NHK Cup Champion" (名誉NHK杯選手権者) is awarded to players who win the tournament 10 times. To date, only one player has won the tournament enough times to be awarded this title: Sakata Eio who won the tournament a total of 11 times.
