= Shuchi Kubouchi =

Japanese Go player (1920–2020)

Personal information
- Native name: 窪内秀知 (Japanese)
- Full name: Shuchi Kubouchi
- Born: January 25, 1920 Japan
- Died: January 21, 2020 (aged 99)

Sport
- Turned pro: 1935
- Teacher: Katsukiyo Kubomatsu
- Rank: 9 dan
- Affiliation: Kansai Ki-in

Shuchi Kubouchi (窪内秀知, Kubouchi Shuchi; January 25, 1920 – January 21, 2020) was a Japanese professional Go player.

== Biography ==
Kubouchi became a professional 9-dan in 1960 for the Kansai Ki-in. His teacher was Katsukiyo Kubomatsu. He died in January 2020, a few days short of his one hundredth birthday.

== Titles ==
Title	Years Held
Current	1
(Japan) Kansai Ki-in Championship	1963

== See also ==
- International Go Federation
- List of Go organizations
- List of professional Go tournaments
