= Sato Sunao =

Japanese Go player

Personal information
- Native name: 佐藤 直男 (Japanese)
- Full name: Sato Sunao
- Born: 1924 Japan
- Died: July 8, 2004 (aged 80)

Sport
- Pupil: Hideyuki Sakai
- Rank: 9 dan

Sato Sunao (佐藤 直男, Satō Sunao; 1924 – July 8, 2004) was a professional Go player.

Sato was a 9 dan who played in the Kansai Ki-in. He had many pupils, including Yuki Satoshi, Izumo Tetsuya, Maeda Ryo, and Furuya Yutaka. Sato became a 9 dan in 1963.

== Titles ==
Title	Years Held
Current	3
(Japan) Kansai Ki-in Championship	1957, 1964, 1981
