= All Japan Student Go Federation =

Japanese student Go organization

The All Japan Student Go Federation (Zen Nihon Gakusei Igo Renmei (全日本学生囲碁連盟)) is a Japanese student Go organization for holding university Go championships. They have branches in each region (Kanto, Kansai, Kyushu, Tohoku etc.). For similar organizations, there is the American Collegiate Go Association in the United States.

== Differences with other organizations ==
In Japan, most Go tournaments are operated by Nihon Ki-in or Kansai Ki-in. All Japan Student Go Federation and their branches are focused for university-based tournaments. They are not under direct control but have close relationship with them.

== Tournaments ==
They are holding various tournaments with corporate sponsors.

=== World Students Go Oza Championship ===
This is a tournament to determine the student world champion since 2003. Representative players from each region (including Taiwan, Europe, Oceania etc.) will compete. The expected games in 2020 have been cancelled due to the COVID-19 outbreak.

=== All Japan University Go Championship ===
This is a team competition by each university representatives. Teams that have cleared regional preliminaries can attend. Each team can send only five members and substitute players. The sponsor is Yomiuri Shimbun (as same as Yomiuri Giants)

| Season | Year | Winner | 2nd | 3rd | 4th | 5th | 6th | 7th | 8th |
|---|---|---|---|---|---|---|---|---|---|
| 1 | 1957 | Chuo | Kansai Gakuin | Hokkaido | Kagoshima | Nanzan | - | - | - |
| 2 | 1958 | Keio | Kansai Gakuin | Kyushu | Nagoya | Hokkaido | - | - | - |
| 3 | 1959 | Keio | Kyushu | Hokkaido | Nagoya | Osaka Prefectural Univ. | Hiroshima | - | - |
| 4 | 1960 | Tokyo | Kyushu | Nagoya | Ritsumeikan | Toyama | Hokkaido | Hiroshima | - |
| 5 | 1961 | Chuo | Nagoya | Ritsumeikan | Akita | Kyushu | Hiroshima | Hokkaido Gakugei Univ. | Toyama |
| 6 | 1962 | Tokyo | Nagoya | Ritsumeikan | Hiroshima | Saga | Hokkaido | Niigata | Tohoku |
| 7 | 1963 | Keio | Nagoya | Kyoto | Hokkaido | Okayama | Kyushu | Tohoku | Niigata |
| 8 | 1964 | Meiji | Kyoto | Hokkaido | Nagoya | Okayama | Ryukyu | Yamagata | Niigata |
| 9 | 1965 | Hiroshima | Tokyo | Kyoto | Hokkaido | Nagoya | Tohoku | Fukuoka | Niigata |
| 10 | 1966 | Hokkaido | Tokyo | Osaka | Tohoku | Aichi Gakuin | Matsuyama Commercial | Kyushu | Niigata |
| 11 | 1967 | Kyoto | Chuo | Hokkaido | Tohoku | Aichi Gakuin | Kyushu | Kagawa | Kanazawa |
| 12 | 1968 | Nihon | Osaka | Hiroshima | Hokkaido | Ryukyu | Yamagata | Niigata | Aichi Gakuin |
| 13 | 1969 | Chuo | Kyoto | Hokkaido | Nagoya City Univ. | Yamagata | Hiroshima | North Kyushu | Kanazawa |
| 14 | 1970 | Waseda | | | | | | | |
| 15 | 1971 | Waseda | | | | | | | |
| 16 | 1972 | Waseda | | | | | | | |
| 17 | 1973 | Waseda | | | | | | | |
| 18 | 1974 | Kyushu | | | | | | | |
| 19 | 1975 | Tokyo | | | | | | | |
| 20 | 1976 | Kyushu | | | | | | | |
| 21 | 1977 | Tokyo | | | | | | | |
| 22 | 1978 | Keio | | | | | | | |
| 23 | 1979 | Kyoto | | | | | | | |
| 24 | 1980 | Keio | | | | | | | |
| 25 | 1981 | Kyoto | | | | | | | |
| 26 | 1982 | Tokyo | | | | | | | |
| 27 | 1983 | Osaka | | | | | | | |
| 28 | 1984 | Tohoku | | | | | | | |
| 29 | 1985 | Tohoku | | | | | | | |
| 30 | 1986 | Tohoku | | | | | | | |
| 31 | 1987 | Tohoku | Tokyo | Kyoto | Shinshu | Hiroshima | Nagoya | Hokkaido | Kyushu |
| 32 | 1988 | Tokyo | Tohoku | Kyoto | Hiroshima | Kyushu | Shinshu | Hokkaido | Nagoya |
| 33 | 1989 | Tohoku | Tokyo | Hokkaido | Osaka City Univ. | Kanazawa | Nagoya | Kyushu | Hiroshima |
| 34 | 1990 | Tokyo | Tohoku | Hokkaido | Kyoto | Nagoya | Yamaguchi | Shinshu | Kyushu |
| 35 | 1991 | Tokyo | Ritsumeikan | Hokkaido | Tohoku | Nagoya | Kanazawa | Hiroshima | Kyushu |
| 36 | 1992 | Tokyo | Kyoto | Tohoku | Shinshu | Hokkaido | Nagoya | Kyushu | Hiroshima |
| 37 | 1993 | Hokkaido | Waseda | Tohoku | Ritsumeikan | Kumamoto | Shinshu | Nagoya | Okayama |
| 38 | 1994 | Tokyo | Tohoku | Kobe | Hokkaido | Nagoya | Okayama | Shinshu | Kumamoto |
| 39 | 1995 | Hokkaido | Ritsumeikan | Tokyo | Tohoku | Kumamoto | Shinshu | Okayama | Nagoya |
| 40 | 1996 | Waseda | Hokkaido | Ritsumeikan | Kumamoto | Tohoku | Kanazawa | Chukyo | Hiroshima |
| 41 | 1997 | Kyoto | Keio | Tohoku | Kumamoto | Shinshu | Hokkaido | Hiroshima | Nagoya |
| 42 | 1998 | Kyoto | Tokyo | Tohoku | Shinshu | Chukyo | Kyushu | Hokkaido | Okayama |
| 43 | 1999 | Tokyo | Tohoku | Kyoto | Nagoya | Shinshu | Okayama | Hokkaido | Kyushu |
| 44 | 2000 | Waseda | Kyoto | Tohoku | Kyushu | Okayama | Nagoya | Shinshu | Hokkaido |
| 45 | 2001 | Waseda | Kyoto | Tohoku | Nagoya | Kyushu | Okayama | Shinshu | Hokkaido |
| 46 | 2002 | Tokyo | Ritsumeikan | Tohoku | Nagoya | Kyushu | Hokkaido | Okayama | Kanazawa |
| 47 | 2003 | Tokyo | Ritsumeikan | Tohoku | Kyushu | Nagoya | Kanazawa | Hokkaido | Okayama |
| 48 | 2004 | Ritsumeikan | Tokyo | Kyushu | Tohoku | Kanazawa | Hokkaido | Okayama | Nagoya |
| 49 | 2005 | Ritsumeikan | Tohoku | Waseda | Kyushu | Hokkaido | Kanazawa | Meijo | Hiroshima |
| 50 | 2006 | Waseda | Ritsumeikan | Tohoku | Kyushu | Kanazawa | Hokkaido | Ehime | Meijo |
| 51 | 2007 | Waseda | Ritsumeikan | Tohoku | Hiroshima | Hokkaido | Kyushu | Gifu | Kanazawa |
| 52 | 2008 | Ritsumeikan | Keio | Tohoku | Kyushu | Hokkaido | Okayama | Nagoya | Shinshu |
| 53 | 2009 | Ritsumeikan | Waseda | Tohoku | Hokkaido | Kyushu | Nagoya | Shinshu | Okayama |
| 54 | 2010 | Waseda | Ritsumeikan | Okayama | Hokkaido | Shinshu | Gifu | Tohoku | Kyushu |
| 55 | 2011 | Waseda | Ritsumeikan | Okayama | Gifu | Hokkaido | Tohoku | Kyushu | Shinshu |
| 56 | 2012 | Ritsumeikan | Waseda | Okayama | Hokkaido | Shinshu | Tohoku | Kyushu | Gifu |
| 57 | 2013 | Waseda | Ritsumeikan | Okayama | Tohoku | Hokkaido | Kyushu | Kanazawa | Chukyo |
| 58 | 2014 | Waseda | Ritsumeikan | Okayama | Chukyo | Tohoku | Kanazawa | Hokkaido | Kyushu |
| 59 | 2015 | Ritsumeikan | Keio | Chukyo | Hokkaido | Okayama | Kyushu | Tohoku | Kanazawa |
| 60 | 2016 | Waseda | Ritsumeikan | Hokkaido | Tohoku | Kanazawa | Kyushu | Gifu | Hiroshima |
| 61 | 2017 | Ritsumeikan | Waseda | Tohoku | Hokkaido | Hiroshima | Gifu | Kyushu | Kanazawa |
| 62 | 2018 | Waseda | Ritsumeikan | Tohoku | Kyushu | Hiroshima | Kanazawa | Hokkaido | Gifu |
| 63 | 2019 | Ritsumeikan | Waseda | Tohoku | Hokkaido | Kyushu | Okayama | Kanazawa | Mie |

=== All Japan Female Student Honinbo ===
This is the only one tournament that limits participants by gender. The sponsor is Mainichi Shinbun. Some winners have eventually obtained professional status, or became top amateur players.

| Season | Year | Winner |
|---|---|---|
| 32 | 1997 | Tomomi Hoshino (Waseda) |
| 33 | 1998 | Fu Hong Mei (Dokkyo) |
| 34-35 | 1999-2000 | Mizuyo Kamasaki (Hiroshima) |
| 37 and 40 | 2002 and 2005 | Miki Aragaki (Waseda) |
| 38 | 2003 | Marie Unegawa (Waseda) |
| 39 | 2004 | Kozue Takakura (Chuo) |
| 41 | 2006 | Risa Sasago (Waseda) |
| 42 | 2006 | Wang Jing Yi (Hosei) |
| 43 | 2007 | Yin Shanchun (尹善渶, Keio) |
| 44-46 | 2008-2010 | Reiko Sekine (Taisho) |
| 47 | 2011 | Noriko Horimoto (Ritsumeikan) |
| 48 | 2012 | Go Risa (Ritsumeikan) |
| 49 | 2013 | Yuka Kimoto (Hoso) |
| 50-51 | 2014-2015 | Karin Tsukada (Ritsumeikan) |
| 52-54 | 2016-2018 | Akiko Fujiwara (Waseda) |
| 55 | 2019 | Moeka Tsuji (Keio) |

=== All Japan Student Go Best 10 ===
This is the only one university championship that allows the attendance of high school and graduate students. It is held since 1964. The sponsor is The Asahi Shimbun.
