= Atsushi Ida =

Japanese Go player

Personal information
- Native name: 伊田 篤史 (Japanese)
- Born: 15 March 1994 (age 32) Mie Prefecture, Japan

Sport
- Turned pro: 2009
- Teacher: Shigeru Baba
- Rank: 9 dan
- Affiliation: Nihon Ki-in

Atsushi Ida (伊田 篤史 Ida Atsushi, born 15 March 1994) is a professional Go player from Japan. He is affiliated with Nihon Ki-in Chubu branch.

== Biography ==
Ida became professional in 2009. He was the pupil of Shigeru Baba, a professional 9-dan player.

== Achievements ==
In March 2015, Ida beat Ryo Ichiriki (pro 7-dan) and became the winner of the 62nd NHK Cup. The NHK Cup was his first win in official tournament. He was the youngest NHK Cup winner at 20 years and 11 months.

In April 2015, Ida beat Shinji Takao to win the Judan title. He was the youngest Judan title holder at 21 years old.

In November 2016, Ida beat Naoki Hane to take the Okan. At 22 years old, Ida was the youngest Okan winner. The previous record was held by Naoki Hane who won the title at 23 years old.

== Titles ==
Title	Years Held
Current	11
(Japan) NHK Cup	2015
(Japan) Judan	2015
(Japan) Okan	2016-24
