= Dogen Handa =

Japanese Go player

Personal information
- Native name: 半田道玄 (Japanese)
- Full name: Dogen Handa
- Born: October 25, 1915 Japan
- Died: April 13, 1974 (aged 58) Japan

Sport
- Teacher: Tamejiro Suzuki
- Rank: 9 dan

Dogen Handa (半田 道玄, Handa Dōgen; October 25, 1915 – April 13, 1974) also known as Hayami Handa, was a professional Go player.

== Biography ==
Handa grew up as Tamejiro Suzuki's disciple. He started as a pro in the Nihon Ki-in, but after the Kansai Ki-in's founding, he joined Utaro Hashimoto in the Kansai-Kiin. He became a 9p in 1959.

== Titles & runners-up ==
Title	Years Held
Current	6
(Japan) Judan	1963
(Japan) Oza	1960, 1965
(Japan) KK Championship	1958, 1960, 1961

Title	Years Lost
Current	5
(Japan) Honinbo	1962
(Japan) Judan	1962, 1964
(Japan) Oza	1957, 1958
