= Jūdan (Go) =

Japanese Go competition

- Full name: Jūdan
- Started: 1962
- Sponsors: Sankei Shimbun
- Prize money: ¥7 million
- Affiliation: Nihon Ki-in

The Jūdan (十段; "10 dan") is a Go competition in Japan. It is one of the seven major professional titles.

== Description ==
The Jūdan is a Go competition used by the Japanese Nihon-Kiin and Kansai-Kiin. It was started by the Sankei Shimbun newspaper in 1962. The format is similar to the other big titles in Japan. There is a preliminary tournament that decides the challenger. Although, there is something different about the preliminary tournament. Instead of single knockout, it is a double knockout tournament. There is a losers' section where if a player loses in the preliminary, they go to the losers' section. The winner of the losers' section plays the winner of the winners' section which ultimately decides the challenger for the title. The challenger then plays against the holder in a best of 5 match.

In the Jūdan competition, if a player wins the challenger section, they are promoted to 7 dan. Winning the title gives the player a promotion to 8 dan. If the player subsequently wins another of the second tier top titles (Gosei, Judan, Oza, Tengen), the player will be promoted to 9 dan. The competition had a predecessor, named Hayago Meijin, that ran from 1956 to 1961.

== Past winners ==
Judan
| | Year | Winner | Score | Runner-up |
|---|---|---|---|---|
| 1 | 1962 | Utaro Hashimoto | 3–1 | Dogen Handa |
| 2 | 1963 | Dogen Handa | 3–1 | Utaro Hashimoto |
| 3 | 1964 | Hosai Fujisawa | 3–2 | Dogen Handa |
| 4 | 1965 | Kaku Takagawa | 3–1 | Hosai Fujisawa |
| 5 | 1966 | Eio Sakata | 3–1 | Kaku Takagawa |
| 6 | 1967 | Eio Sakata | 3–2 | Hosai Fujisawa |
| 7 | 1968 | Eio Sakata | 3–1 | Hideyuki Fujisawa |
| 8 | 1969 | Hideo Otake | 3–0 | Eio Sakata |
| 9 | 1971 | Utaro Hashimoto | 3–2 | Hideo Otake |
| 10 | 1972 | Eio Sakata | 3–2 | Utaro Hashimoto |
| 11 | 1973 | Eio Sakata | 3–0 | Shoichi Takagi |
| 12 | 1974 | Shoji Hashimoto | 3–1 | Eio Sakata |
| 13 | 1975 | Rin Kaiho | 3–0 | Shoji Hashimoto |
| 14 | 1976 | Masao Kato | 3–2 | Rin Kaiho |
| 15 | 1977 | Masao Kato | 3–0 | Eio Sakata |
| 16 | 1978 | Masao Kato | 3–1 | Rin Kaiho |
| 17 | 1979 | Masao Kato | 3–1 | Shoji Hashimoto |
| 18 | 1980 | Hideo Otake | 3–2 | Masao Kato |
| 19 | 1981 | Hideo Otake | 3–0 | Shoji Hashimoto |
| 20 | 1982 | Cho Chikun | 3–1 | Hideo Otake |
| 21 | 1983 | Masao Kato | 3–2 | Cho Chikun |
| 22 | 1984 | Koichi Kobayashi | 3–2 | Masao Kato |
| 23 | 1985 | Koichi Kobayashi | 3–0 | Hideo Otake |
| 24 | 1986 | Koichi Kobayashi | 3–0 | Masaki Takemiya |
| 25 | 1987 | Masao Kato | 3–1 | Koichi Kobayashi |
| 26 | 1988 | Cho Chikun | 3–2 | Masao Kato |
| 27 | 1989 | Cho Chikun | 3–0 | Rin Kaiho |
| 28 | 1990 | Masaki Takemiya | 3–2 | Cho Chikun |
| 29 | 1991 | Masaki Takemiya | 3–2 | Cho Chikun |
| 30 | 1992 | Masaki Takemiya | 3–1 | Koichi Kobayashi |
| 31 | 1993 | Hideo Otake | 3–1 | Masaki Takemiya |
| 32 | 1994 | Hideo Otake | 3–2 | Koichi Kobayashi |
| 33 | 1995 | Norimoto Yoda | 3–0 | Hideo Otake |
| 34 | 1996 | Norimoto Yoda | 3–1 | O Rissei |
| 35 | 1997 | Masao Kato | 3–2 | Norimoto Yoda |
| 36 | 1998 | Naoto Hikosaka | 3–2 | Masao Kato |
| 37 | 1999 | Koichi Kobayashi | 3–0 | Naoto Hikosaka |
| 38 | 2000 | Koichi Kobayashi | 3–0 | Hironari Nakano |
| 39 | 2001 | O Rissei | 3–2 | Koichi Kobayashi |
| 40 | 2002 | O Rissei | 3–2 | Masaki Takemiya |
| 41 | 2003 | O Rissei | 3–2 | Shinji Takao |
| 42 | 2004 | O Rissei | 3–1 | Cho U |
| 43 | 2005 | Cho Chikun | 3–2 | O Rissei |
| 44 | 2006 | Cho Chikun | 3–1 | Keigo Yamashita |
| 45 | 2007 | Cho Chikun | 3–2 | Keigo Yamashita |
| 46 | 2008 | Shinji Takao | 3–0 | Cho Chikun |
| 47 | 2009 | Cho U | 3–1 | Shinji Takao |
| 48 | 2010 | Cho U | 3–0 | Keigo Yamashita |
| 49 | 2011 | Yuta Iyama | 3–2 | Cho U |
| 50 | 2012 | Yuta Iyama | 3–1 | Cho U |
| 51 | 2013 | Satoshi Yuki | 3–2 | Yuta Iyama |
| 52 | 2014 | Shinji Takao | 3–2 | Satoshi Yuki |
| 53 | 2015 | Ida Atsushi | 3–2 | Shinji Takao |
| 54 | 2016 | Yuta Iyama | 3–1 | Atsushi Ida |
| 55 | 2017 | Yuta Iyama | 3–1 | Yo Seiki |
| 56 | 2018 | Yuta Iyama | 3–0 | Murakawa Daisuke |
| 57 | 2019 | Murakawa Daisuke | 3–1 | Yuta Iyama |
| 58 | 2020 | Toramaru Shibano | 3–1 | Murakawa Daisuke |
| 59 | 2021 | Kyo Kagen | 3–2 | Toramaru Shibano |
| 60 | 2022 | Kyo Kagen | 3–0 | Yo Seiki |
| 61 | 2023 | Toramaru Shibano | 3–1 | Kyo Kagen |
| 62 | 2024 | Yuta Iyama | 3–2 | Toramaru Shibano |
| 63 | 2025 | Toramaru Shibano | 3–0 | Yuta Iyama |
| 64 | 2026 | Toramaru Shibano | 3–2 | Kyo Kagen |
