= Keizo Suzuki =

Japanese Go player

Personal information
- Native name: 鈴木圭三 (Japanese)
- Full name: Keizo Suzuki
- Born: 1927 Japan
- Died: 1945 (aged 17–18) Japan

Sport
- Rank: 3 dan

Keizo Suzuki (鈴木圭三, Suzuki Keizō; 1927–1945) was a professional Go player.

== Biography ==
Keizo Suzuki was a promising Japanese go player – one of the "Three Crows" of the 1940s and early 1950s. He died a premature death at 18 from tuberculosis.

== Sources ==
1. Sensei's Library
