= Tetsuya Kiyonari =

Japanese Go player

Personal information
- Native name: 清成哲也 (Japanese); きよなりてつや (Japanese)
- Full name: Tetsuya Kiyonari
- Born: November 27, 1961 (age 64) Miyazaki, Japan

Sport
- Turned pro: 1976
- Teacher: Shozo Kurahashi
- Rank: 9 dan
- Affiliation: Kansai Ki-in, Osaka branch

Tetsuya Kiyonari (清成哲也, Kiyonari Tetsuya; born November 27, 1961) is a professional Go player.

== Biography ==
Tetsuya became a professional go player in 1976. He was promoted to 9 dan in 1986. He holds the record of fastest promotion from 1 dan to 9 dan in the Kansai Ki-in. Tetsuya has been runner up twice, once in the NHK Cup in 1995, and in the Shinjin-O in 1980. He resides in Osaka, Japan.

== Runners-up ==
| Title | Years Lost |
|---|---|
| (Japan) NHK Cup | 1995 |
| (Japan) Shinjin-O | 1980 |

== Promotion record ==
| Rank | Year | Notes |
|---|---|---|
| 1 dan | 1976 | |
| 2 dan | 1977 | |
| 3 dan | 1977 | |
| 4 dan | 1978 | |
| 5 dan | 1979 | |
| 6 dan | 1980 | |
| 7 dan | 1982 | |
| 8 dan | 1983 | |
| 9 dan | 1986 | Became fastest in Kansai Ki-in history to reach 9 dan. Record is 10 years and 3 months. |

== Awards ==
- Kansai Ki-in Best Player Award one time.
- Dougen Prize winner three times.
- Fields and Mountains Prize one time.
- Kansai Ki-in Best Newcomer Award one time.
