= Otake Hideo =

Retired Japanese Go player (born 1942)

Personal information
- Native name: 大竹英雄 (Japanese); オオタケヒデオ (Japanese)
- Full name: Otake Hideo
- Nickname: Aesthetics GO Player
- Born: May 12, 1942 (age 84) Kitakyūshū, Japan

Sport
- Turned pro: 1956
- Teacher: Minoru Kitani
- Rank: 9 dan
- Affiliation: Nihon Ki-in

Otake Hideo (大竹 英雄, Ōtake Hideo; born May 12, 1942) is a retired Japanese professional Go player.

== Biography ==
Otake was born in Kitakyūshū City, Japan. He joined the legendary Kitani Minoru school when he was 9, and quickly rose up the ranks to turn professional in 1956, when he was 14. He progressed swiftly, achieving 9 dan in 1970. He did not have much patience, which could be seen as he would sometimes read comic books while he waited for his opponent to play.

He retired from professional Go in 2021 at the age of 79. His career win–loss record was 1319 wins, 846 losses, 5 draws (jigo), and 1 no-result.

== Titles and runners-up ==
Ranks #4 in total number of titles in Japan.

Domestic
Title	Wins	Runners-up
Kisei		2 (1981, 1990)
Meijin	4 (1975, 1976, 1978, 1979)	8 (1977, 1980, 1982-1984, 1990, 1992, 1993)
Honinbo		1 (1988)
Oza	1 (1975)	3 (1969, 1976, 1983)
Judan	5 (1969, 1980, 1981, 1993, 1994)	4 (1971, 1982, 1985, 1995)
Gosei	7 (1978, 1980–1985)	3 (1976, 1979, 1986)
Ryusei	1 (1992)	
NHK Cup	5 (1968, 1971, 1973, 1975, 1994)	3 (1972, 1983, 1990)
NEC Cup	3 (1986, 1988, 1995)	2 (1981, 1990)
Kakusei	5 (1981, 1983, 1984, 1987, 1988)	3 (1986, 1991, 1992)
Hayago Championship	2 (1973, 1976)	2 (1974, 1979)
Prime Minister Cup	1 (1965)	
Dai-ichi	5 (1970, 1971, 1973–1975)	
Total	41	31
Continental
Asian TV Cup	1 (1994)	
Total	1	0
International
Ing Cup		1 (1992)
Fujitsu Cup	1 (1992)	
IBM Cup	1 (1989)	
Total	2	1
Career total
Total	44	32

== Honours ==
- Order of the Rising Sun, 3rd Class, Gold Rays with Neck Ribbon (2015)
