= Hideyuki Fujisawa =

Japanese Go player

Personal information
- Native name: 藤沢秀行 (Japanese)
- Full name: Hideyuki Fujisawa
- Nickname: The Monster
- Born: June 14, 1925 Yokohama, Japan
- Died: May 8, 2009 (aged 83) Tokyo, Japan

Sport
- Turned pro: 1940
- Retired: 1998
- Pupil: Kazunari Fujisawa, Shinji Takao, Michihiro Morita, Tomoyasu Mimura, Masayuki Kurahashi
- Rank: 9 dan

Hideyuki Fujisawa (藤沢 秀行, Fujisawa Hideyuki; June 14, 1925 – May 8, 2009), also known as Shuko Fujisawa, was a Japanese professional Go player. He was the younger uncle of professional Go player, Hosai Fujisawa and the grandfather of professional Go player Rina Fujisawa.

== Biography ==
Hideyuki Fujisawa was born in Yokohama, Japan. He was one of the best players during his era. One of the "Three Crows" along with Yamabe Toshiro and Keizo Suzuki (and later Takeo Kajiwara). Even though he was known more for his controversial acts, such as having a bad drinking habit, the most important thing that shone through about Fujisawa was his Go skill. Besides Go, he was known to gamble and was a successful real estate dealer. He was also known for his calligraphy and had several exhibits of his works. He also stated in his autobiography, although he did not mind being called Shuko, he preferred to be called Hideyuki.

He is the father of Kazunari Fujisawa, an 8-dan Go professional, and the grandfather of Rina Fujisawa, a 7-dan Go professional who has won multiple female titles.

== Early go life ==
Fujisawa turned pro in 1940 and reached 9 dan in 1963. He won his first major title in 1962, the Meijin. He then won two Asahi Pro Best Ten titles in 1965 and 1968. He won his second major title, the Oza, which he held for three consecutive years from 1967 to 1969. The same year that he lost the Oza, he won the NHK Cup. He didn't win the NHK Cup again until 1981. The Meijin title was Fujisawa's again when he won it in 1970. He then went on a dry streak of titles. By 1976, he won his first title since the Meijin in 1970, the Tengen.

== Height of career ==
Fujisawa went on to surprise critics as he won the Kisei title six straight years from 1976 to 1982. It has been said that during these Kisei runs in the 1970s and 1980s, Fujisawa would drink for nine months straight, then sober up for his title defense late in the year. By 1980, nobody thought anyone else but Fujisawa would win the Kisei, but that was silenced when he finally lost it to Cho Chikun in 1982. He won the first three games, controlling each move Cho made. It looked like Fujisawa would hold the Kisei for the seventh year in a row, but Cho fought back and won the last four games, as Fujisawa made a blunder in a winning position in the seventh game. After his run of consecutive Kisei titles, the Japanese Nihon-Kiin awarded him Honorary Kisei. He was known to play a very flexible fuseki but was infamous for making blunders (poka) later in the game. The saying was that Fujisawa Shuko plays the best first 50 moves.

== Later life ==
Fujisawa would not win another title until ten years later. He again won the Oza and held it for two years at the age of 67. He thus set a record for the oldest player to defend a title, a record which holds to this day. In October 1998, he decided to retire from the Go world at the age of 74. The following year Fujisawa was expelled from the Nihon Ki-in for selling unsanctioned rank diplomas to amateurs in protest against what he considered improper Ki-in policies. In June 2003, the dispute was resolved and Fujisawa was reinstated to the Ki-in.

He died of aspiration pneumonia in Tokyo at 7:16 a.m on May 8, 2009, at St. Luke's International Hospital in Tokyo.

== Students ==
Fujisawa was the teacher of some of today's leading professionals in Japan, including Shinji Takao, Tomoyasu Mimura, and his own son Kazunari Fujisawa.

Moreover, he also contributed hugely to Go outside Japan. He put enormous effort into Chinese Go despite his own economic hardship. Many of the greatest China players including Nie Weiping, Chen Zude, Chang Hao, Ma Xiaochun were deeply influenced by Fujisawa. The help he gave to Chinese Go even bolstered China in its rivalry with Japan: China won most (9 out of 13) of China-Japan Supermatches, and many of its winners were Fujisawa's students.

== Titles and runners-up ==
Ranks No. 11 in total number of titles in Japan.

Domestic
Title	Wins	Runners-up
Kisei	6 (1977–1982)	1 (1983)
Meijin	2 (1962, 1970)	4 (1963, 1964, 1971, 1972)
Honinbo		2 (1960, 1966)
Tengen	1 (1976)	1 (1978)
Oza	5 (1967–1969, 1991, 1992)	2 (1970, 1993)
Judan		1 (1968)
NHK Cup	2 (1969, 1981)	3 (1963, 1964, 1966)
Nihon Ki-in Championship		1 (1961)
Hayago Championship	1 (1968)	1 (1978)
Asahi Top Position	1 (1960)	1 (1961)
Asahi Pro Best Ten	2 (1965, 1968)	
Dai-ichi		2 (1970, 1974)
Asahi Top Eight Players		1 (1976)
Total	20	20

== Bibliography ==
- Fujisawa, Shuko (Hideyuki Fujisawa). Dictionary of Basic Tesuji. 4 vols. Richmond, VA: Slate and Shell, 2004.
