= Yuki Satoshi =

Japanese professional Go player (born 1972)

Personal information
- Native name: 結城 聡 (Japanese)
- Full name: Yuki Satoshi
- Born: 11 February 1972 (age 54) Hyōgo Prefecture, Japan

Sport
- Turned pro: 1984
- Teacher: Sato Sunao
- Rank: 9 dan
- Affiliation: Kansai Ki-in

Yuki Satoshi
Medal record

Representing Japan

Asian Games
Bronze medal – third place	2010 Guangzhou	Men's Team

Yuki Satoshi (結城 聡, Yūki Satoshi; born 11 February 1972) is a Japanese professional Go player.

== Biography ==
Yuki won the NHK Cup in 2010 for the second time in a row, becoming the third player after Eio Sakata and Norimoto Yoda to do so.

He was selected as a representative of the Japanese team at the 16th Asian Games.

In 2010, Yuki reached the final of the 22nd Asian TV Cup. He defeated Chen Yaoye in the first round and followed it by forcing Kang Dongyun into resignation. Yuki then lost to Kong Jie in the final by resignation.

Yuki has represented Japan on the international stage and has beaten several players including Cho Hunhyun, Chang Hao, Gu Li, Lee Sedol and Ma Xiaochun. In November 2010, Yuki won his first major title, the Tengen. He swept title holder Keigo Yamashita in the finals. Yuki's title was the Kansai Ki-in's second major title in 29 years, coming a month after Hideyuki Sakai's Gosei title.

Yuki participated in the RICOH Rengo Championship in 2011. He and his partner Ayumi Suzuki lost to O Meien and Xie Yimin. In April 2011, Yuki reached 1,000 career wins and broke the record for youngest to 1,000 wins by three years (Cho Chikun, 42).

== Career record ==
- 2006: 40–15
- 2007: 35–15
- 2008: 35–17
- 2009: 40–15
- 2010: 38–20
- 2011: 27–20

== Titles and runners-up ==
Domestic
Title	Wins	Runners-up
Kisei		1 (2005)
Judan	1 (2013)	1 (2014)
Tengen	1 (2010)	1 (2011)
Gosei		4 (1997, 2002, 2005, 2009)
Ryusei	2 (2005, 2015)	3 (2006, 2007, 2011)
NHK Cup	5 (2009, 2010, 2012, 2013, 2014)	1 (2007)
Shinjin-O	1 (1993)	1 (1990)
Kansai Ki-in Championship	7 (1996, 2006–2009, 2014, 2015)	1 (2010)
Kakusei	1 (2003)	
Hayago Championship	1 (1995)	1 (1991)
JAL Super Hayago Championship	1 (2003)	
Total	19	15
Continental
Asian TV Cup		1 (2010)
Total	0	1
Career total
Total	19	16

== Bibliography ==
- Yuki, Satoshi (2004). 結城聡 戦いに強くなる方法―シチョウの達人を目指す (真・囲碁講座シリーズ) (in Japanese). 毎日コミュニケーションズ. ISBN 978-4839915094.
- Yuki, Satoshi (2005). 結城聡名局細解 (in Japanese). Seibundo Shinkosha. ISBN 978-4416705124.
- Yuki, Satoshi (2008). 結城聡 囲碁・世界の新手法ガイド (in Japanese). Seibundo Shinkosha. ISBN 9784416508121.
- Yuki, Satoshi (2009). 決定版 大斜・村正・大ナダレ (in Japanese). Seibundo Shinkosha. ISBN 978-4416509050.
- Yuki, Satoshi (2010). プロの選んだ30の定石 アマの好きな30の定石 (in Japanese). ISBN 978-4416510063.
- Yuki, Satoshi (28 September 2010). 世界一わかりやすい打碁シリーズ 結城聡の碁 (in Japanese). 毎日コミュニケーションズ. ISBN 978-4839936815.
- Yuki, Satoshi (23 September 2013). 星の小ゲイマジマリ 後の攻防: 強くなる 囲碁・必須読本 (in Japanese). Seibundo Shinkosha. ISBN 9784416313091.
- Yuki, Satoshi (2014). 実戦手筋のテクニック (日韓精鋭棋士囲碁双書) (in Japanese). Kientosho 棋苑図書. ISBN 9784873653174.
- Tanioka, Ichiro; Saito, Kenmei; Yuki, Satoshi; Shimamura, Masahiro (2015). Toshitaka Asae (ed.). "結城聡の「冒険また冒険". 囲碁梁山泊 2015 白秋号 (in Japanese) (1st ed.). 関西社会人囲碁連盟. ISBN 9784907488093.
- Rin Kono (19 October 2015). 名局細解 2012年5月号： 第67期本因坊リーグ 河野臨九段 VS 結城聡九段 [Meikyoku Saikai, May 2012 issue - 67th Honinbo league, Rin Kono 9-dan vs Satoshi Kono 9-dan] (kindle) (in Japanese). ASIN B016UBUZLG. Reissue of Meikyoku Saikai supplement to monthly magazine "Igo" covering the 67th Honinbo League on 8 December 2011.
