= Hayago Championship =

Japanese Go competition

The Hayago Championship (早碁選手権戦, Hayago senshuken sen) was a Japanese Go competition.

== Outline ==
The Hayago Championship was a hayago tournament, where each player had to make moves within 10 seconds. The tournament was sponsored by TV Tokyo.

== Past winners ==
Player	Years Held
Fujisawa Hideyuki	1968
Hashimoto Utaro	1969
Miyashita Hidehiro	1970
Fujisawa Hosai	1971
Kobayashi Koichi	1972, 1981, 1986, 1997
Otake Hideo	1973, 1976
Hashimoto Shoji	1974
Rin Kaiho	1975, 1984, 1987
Ohira Shuzo	1977
Takemiya Masaki	1978, 1989
Ishida Yoshio	1979, 1982, 1983
Cho Chikun	1985, 1990 - 1992, 1996, 2001, 2002
Kataoka Satoshi	1993, 1998
Yuki Satoshi	1995
Kobayashi Satoru	1999, 2000
