= Shoji Hashimoto =

Japanese Go player

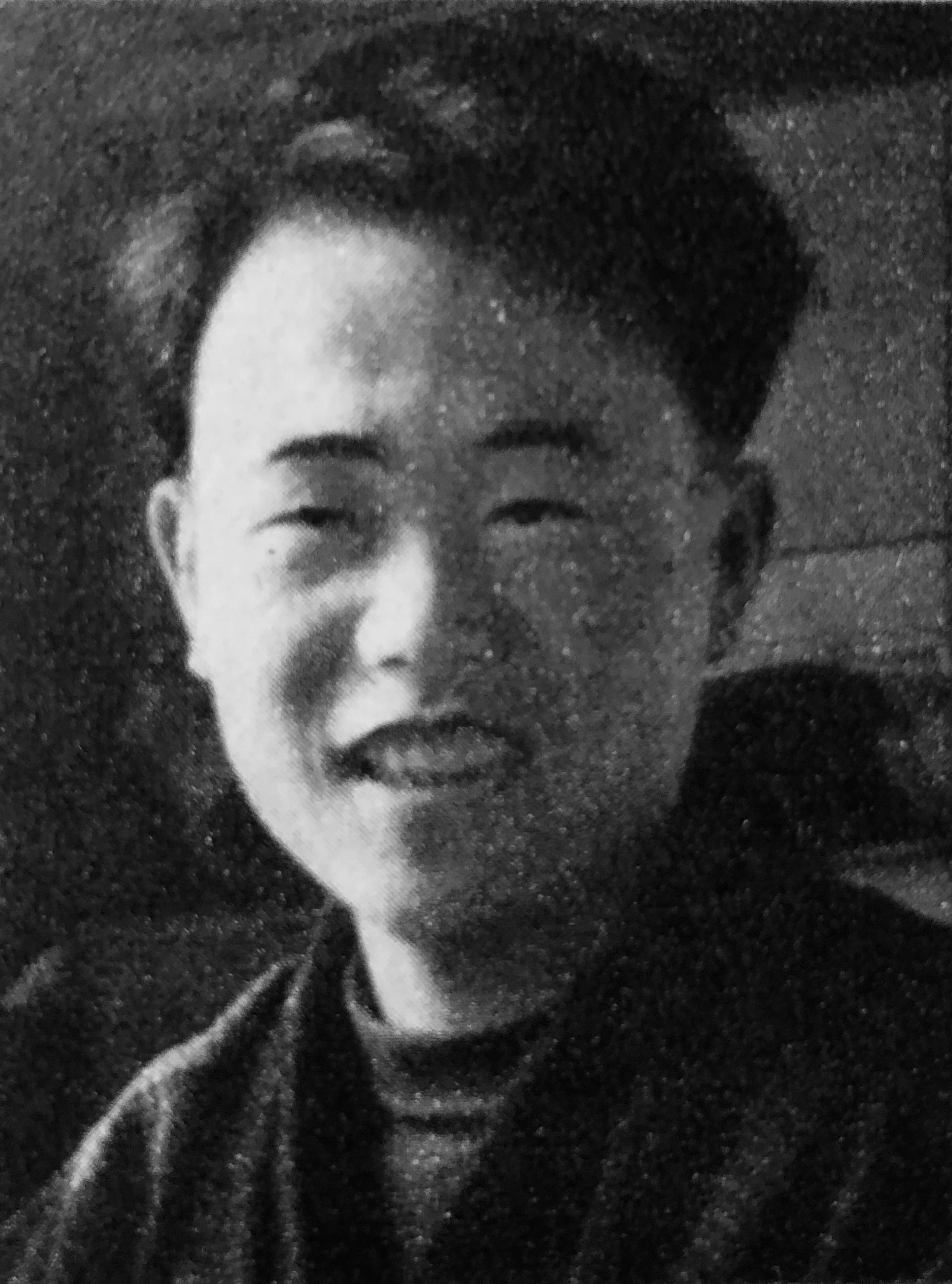
- Shoji Hashimoto in 1954

Personal information
- Native name: 橋本昌二 (Japanese)
- Full name: Shoji Hashimoto
- Born: April 18, 1935 Hyōgo, Japan
- Died: December 2, 2009 (aged 74)

Sport
- Teacher: Kunisaburo Hashimoto
- Rank: 9 dan
- Affiliation: Kansai Ki-in

Shoji Hashimoto (橋本 昌二, Hashimoto Shōji; April 18, 1935 – December 2, 2009) was a professional Go player.

== Biography ==
Hashimoto turned pro in 1947 when he was just 12. It took him only 11 years to reach 9p. He learned Go from his father Hashimoto Kunisaburō and his disciples include Takahara Shūji, Moriyama Naoki, Oda Hiromitsu, Okahashi Hirotada, and Hayashi Kōzō. He was a member of the Kansai Ki-in.

== Titles & runners-up ==
Title	Years Won
(Japan) Judan	1974
(Japan) Oza	1959, 1981
(Japan) NHK Cup	1980, 1985
(Japan) Hayago Championship	1974
(Japan) Kansai Ki-in Championship	1967–1969, 1970–1974, 1978, 1979, 1988, 1990

Title	Years Lost
(Japan) Judan	1975, 1979, 1981
(Japan) Oza	1967, 1982
(Japan) NHK Cup	1968, 1973
(Japan) Kakusei	1982, 1989
(Japan) Hayago Championship	1973
