= Hosai Fujisawa =

Japanese Go player

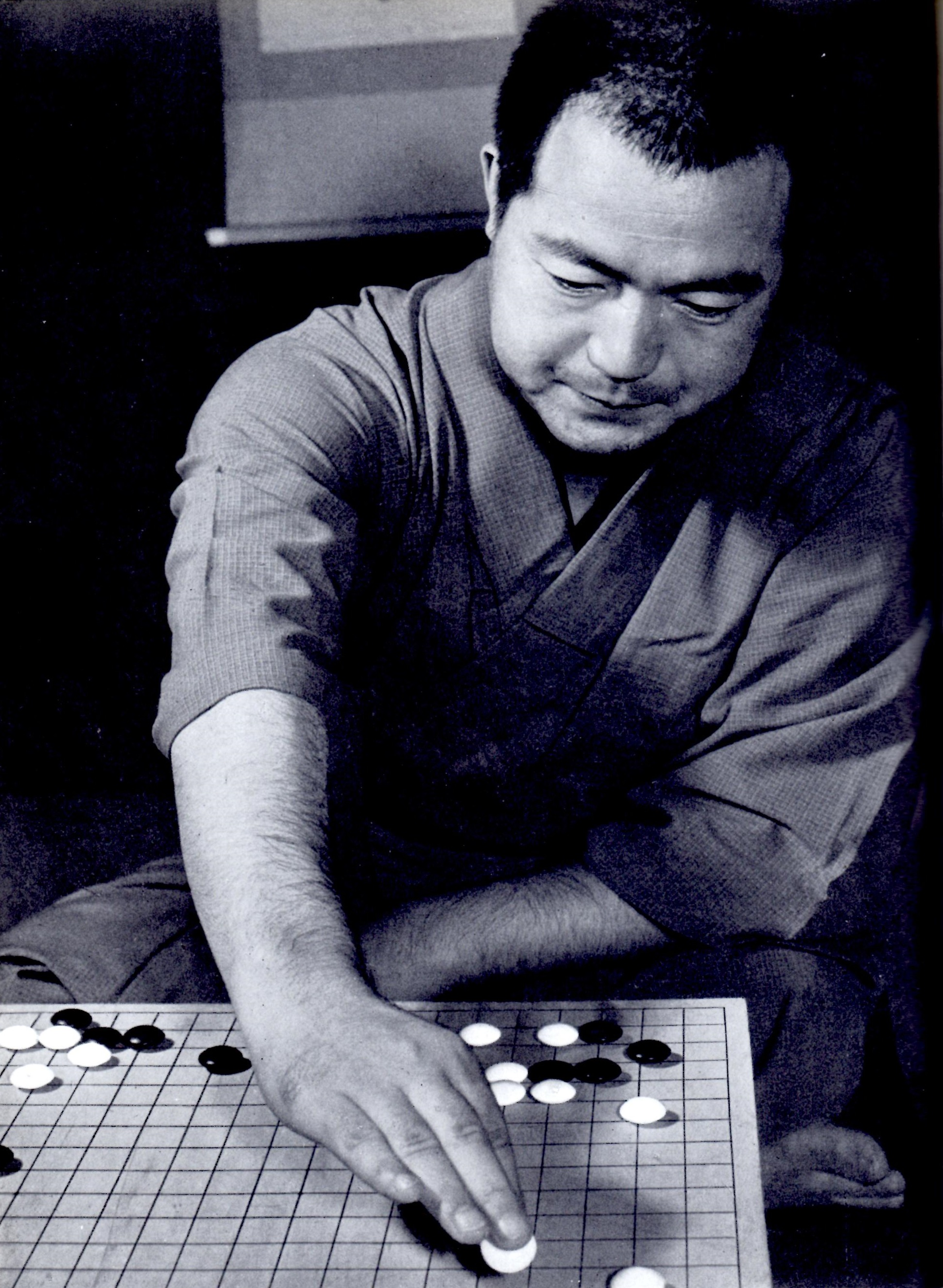

Personal information
- Native name: 藤沢朋斎 (Japanese)
- Full name: Hosai Fujisawa
- Born: March 5, 1919 Yokohama, Japan
- Died: August 2, 1993 (aged 74) Japan

Sport
- Teacher: Honinbō Shūsai
- Rank: 9 dan

Hosai Fujisawa (藤沢 朋斎, Fujisawa Hōsai; born as Kuranosuke Fujisawa (藤沢 庫之助 Fujisawa Kuranosuke), March 5, 1919 – August 2, 1993) was a professional Go player. Hideyuki Fujisawa is his uncle.

== Biography ==
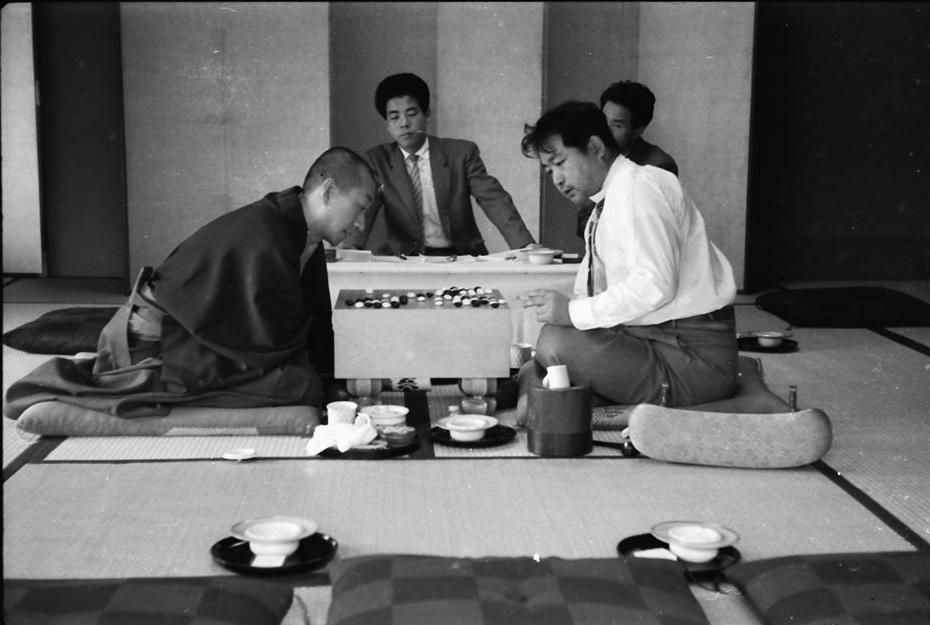
Jubango match against Go Seigen (left)

Hosai Fujisawa was born in Yokohama, Japan. He was among the best players of the 20th century. He became an insei at the Nihon Ki-in when he was 11 years old. He became one of Honinbō Shūsai's disciples. He was known for a strong sense of will, reading deeply and taking long turns. He had a fuseki that was different from other players. Fujisawa would usually open the game on the 3-3 point in one of the corners, then make enclosures on the parallel corner when he played black. When he played white he often played imitation go.

In 1939 and 1940, Fujisawa played a Jubango against Go Seigen when they were respectively 6p and 8p. Fujisawa won the 10.match series 6 to 4, though he did benefit from josen handicap throughout.

He was the first player to be promoted to 9 dan in the Oteai system when he won the Oteai seven times. He was known for playing two jubango matches with Go Seigen some 10 years after the first jubango. These matches occurred in 1951 and 1952, the time when Fujisawa and Go were the only 9 dans. Fujisawa lost both of the matches.

An example of Hosai's fuseki (Hosai is Black).

== Titles & runners-up ==
Title	Years Held
Current	2
(Japan) Judan	1964
(Japan) Oza	1958
Defunct	1
(Japan) Hayago Championship	1971

Title	Years Lost
Current	9
(Japan) Honinbō	1957
(Japan) Judan	1965, 1967
(Japan) Oza	1963
(Japan) NHK Cup	1955, 1957, 1960, 1967, 1969
Defunct	3
(Japan) Hayago Championship	1968, 1970, 1972
