= Toshiro Yamabe =

Japanese Go player

Personal information
- Native name: 山部俊郎 (Japanese)
- Full name: Toshiro Yamabe
- Born: July 31, 1926 Tokyo, Japan
- Died: February 5, 2000 (aged 73)

Sport
- Teacher: Mukai Kazuo
- Rank: 9 dan

Toshiro Yamabe (山部俊郎, Yamabe Toshiro; July 31, 1926 – February 5, 2000) was a professional Go player.

== Biography ==
Toshiro was a student of Mukai Kazuo from 1941. He became shodan professional at the Nihon Ki-in in 1941, and reached 9 dan in 1969. He was known for his early resignations of games, sometimes claiming that he refused to play on because of his opponents mistake.

== Promotion record ==
Rank	Year	Notes
1 dan	1941	
2 dan	1942	
3 dan	1943	
4 dan	1945	
5 dan	1949	
6 dan	1951	
7 dan	1954	
8 dan	1957	
9 dan	1969	

== Titles & runners-up ==
Title	Years Lost
(Japan) Honinbo	1965
(Japan) Tengen	1980
(Japan) Oza	1959
(Japan) Hayago Championship	1977, 1981
(Japan) Igo Senshuken	1965
