= Yoshio Ishida =

Japanese Go player

Personal information
- Native name: 石田芳夫 (Japanese)
- Full name: Yoshio Ishida
- Nickname: The Human Computer
- Born: August 15, 1948 (age 77) Kiyosu, Aichi, Japan

Sport
- Turned pro: 1963
- Teacher: Kitani Minoru
- Rank: 9 dan
- Affiliation: Nihon Ki-in

Yoshio Ishida (石田 芳夫, Ishida Yoshio; born August 15, 1948) is a professional Go player and author of several books on Go.

== Biography ==
By the time he was 8, Ishida started learning Go. He was a student at the legendary Kitani Minoru go school. Famous along with his fellow students Cho Chikun, Kobayashi Koichi, Kato Masao, and Takemiya Masaki. He joined the dojo at a young age like his fellow students. He became a professional in 1963 when he was 15. His dan rank grew quickly because of the Oteai. He would go up the ranks faster than rules allowed after winning the first 14 Oteai games when he was being promoted from 6 to 7 dan. He reached 9 dan in 11 years, faster than most other players do. Ishida was given the nickname "The Computer" because his Yose play and counting skills were far more accurate than other pros.

== Promotion record ==
Rank	Year	Notes
1 dan	1963	
2 dan	1964	
3 dan	1965	
4 dan	1966	
5 dan	1967	
6 dan	1969	
7 dan	1970	
8 dan	1973	
9 dan	1974	

== Titles and runners-up ==
Ranks #9-t in total number of titles in Japan.

Domestic
Title	Wins	Runners-up
Kisei		1 (1979)
Meijin	1 (1974)	3 (1973, 1975, 1976)
Honinbo	5 (1971–1975)	2 (1976, 1978)
Tengen	1 (1984)	1 (1985)
Oza	2 (1974, 1978)	3 (1975, 1979, 1980)
Ryusei		1 (1991)
NHK Cup	3 (1987, 1990, 2001)	2 (1971, 1985)
NEC Cup	1 (1987)	1 (1988)
Nihon-Kiin Championship	2 (1970, 1971)	1 (1972)
Hayago Championship	3 (1979, 1982, 1983)	2 (1987, 2002)
Prime Minister Cup	1 (1968)	
Shin-Ei	1 (1969)	
Asahi Pro Best Ten	2 (1971, 1972)	
Total	22	17
International
IBM Cup	1 (1988)	1 (1989)
Total	1	1
Career total
Total	23	18

== Honors ==
- Medal with Purple Ribbon (2016)
