= Kaku Takagawa =

Japanese Go player

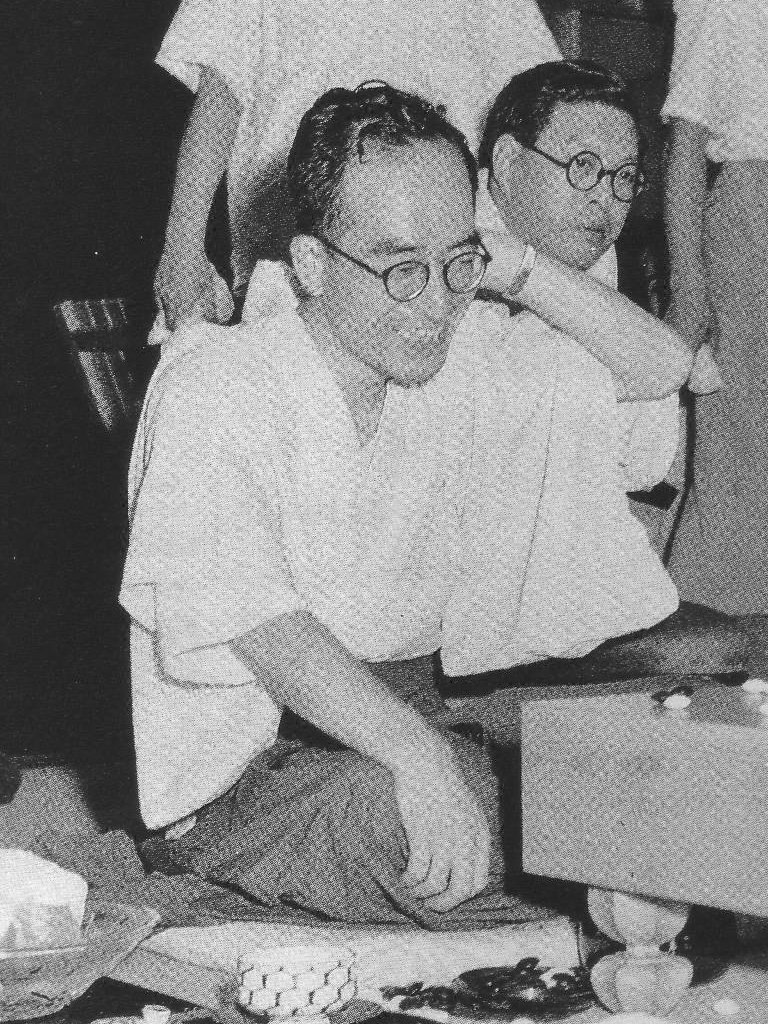

Personal information
- Native name: 高川格 (Japanese)
- Full name: Kaku Takagawa
- Born: September 21, 1915 Wakayama prefecture, Japan
- Died: November 26, 1986 (aged 71)

Sport
- Teacher: Itarō Mitsuhara
- Rank: 9 dan

Kaku Takagawa (高川 格, Takagawa Kaku; September 21, 1915—November 26, 1986), also known as Shūkaku Takagawa (高川 秀格, Takagawa Shūkaku), was one of the most successful professional Go players of the twentieth century.

== Biography ==
Kaku Takagawa won the Honinbō title nine times in a row, from 1952 to 1960, and was subsequently awarded the permanent title of Honorary Honinbo. He then chose Shukaku as his Honinbō name. He is one of the few Honorary Honinbos. He was known for having a healthy rivalry with Sakata Eio. This could be seen as Sakata would constantly beat Takagawa from 1959 to 1966 in the finals of major tournaments.

Takagawa's books, translated from their original Japanese, were instrumental in educating Westerners in the ways of Go. He also wrote a series of articles from 1961 through 1977 for the Nihon Ki-in which was the primary English source of information about Go during that period. These articles were later compiled into Improve Your Intuition, still considered a valuable guide for Go players.

== Style ==
Sakata Eio was known to talk about Takagawa's style of play. He included him in his book Killer Of Go, saying he'd drag out his games so they'd be longer and then his opponent would lose their edge. He was so very cool and collected during games, that he would never tense up before a match. This could be seen when he strolled to many Honinbō title wins. He was also noted to having a very steady and elegant style.

== Promotion record ==
Rank	Year	Notes
1 dan	1928	
2 dan	1931	
3 dan	1935	
4 dan	1936	
5 dan	1939	
6 dan	1941	
7 dan	1945	
8 dan	1954	
9 dan	1960	

== Titles and runners-up ==
Domestic
Title	Wins	Runners-up
Meijin	1 (1968)	1 (1969)
Honinbō	9 (1952–1960)	3 (1961, 1963, 1964)
Oza	1 (1954)	1 (1961)
Judan	1 (1965)	1 (1966)
NHK Cup	1 (1966)	2 (1954, 1959)
Nihon-Kiin Championship	3 (1954, 1962, 1963)	3 (1955, 1959, 1960)
Asahi Pro Best Ten		4 (1964–1967)
Total	16	15

== Books ==
- How to Play Go, Nihon Ki-in 1956 review, used copies, cover
- Vital Points of Go, Nihon Ki-in 1958 review
- The Power of the Star-Point (ISBN 4871870324)
- Improve Your Intuition (ISBN 0-9706193-2-4) Volume 1, (ISBN 0-9706193-2-4) Volume 2, (ISBN 0-9706193-2-4) Volume 3.
