= Sakata Eio =

Japanese Go player (1920–2010)

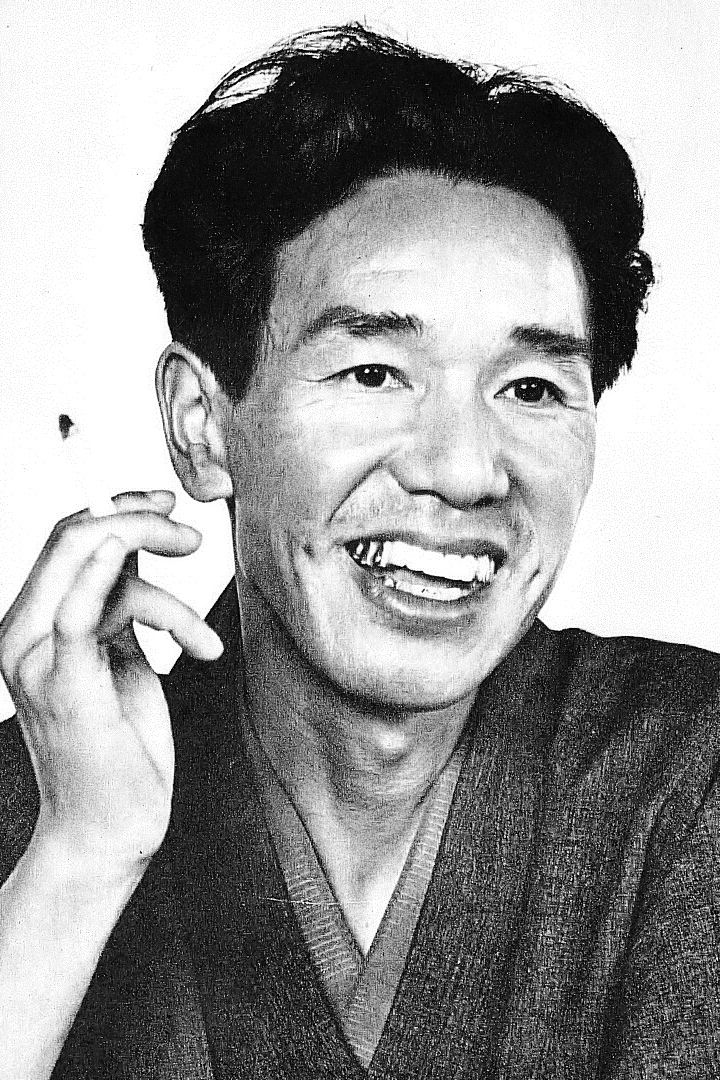

Personal information
- Native name: 坂田栄男 (Japanese); サカタエイオ (Japanese)
- Full name: Sakata Eio
- Born: February 15, 1920 Tokyo, Japan
- Died: October 22, 2010 (aged 90) Tokyo, Japan

Sport
- Turned pro: 1935
- Retired: 2000
- Teacher: Tatsuko Masubuchi
- Rank: 9 dan
- Affiliation: Nihon Ki-in

Sakata Eio (坂田 栄男, Sakata Eio; February 15, 1920 – October 22, 2010) was a 9-dan Japanese professional Go player.

== Biography ==
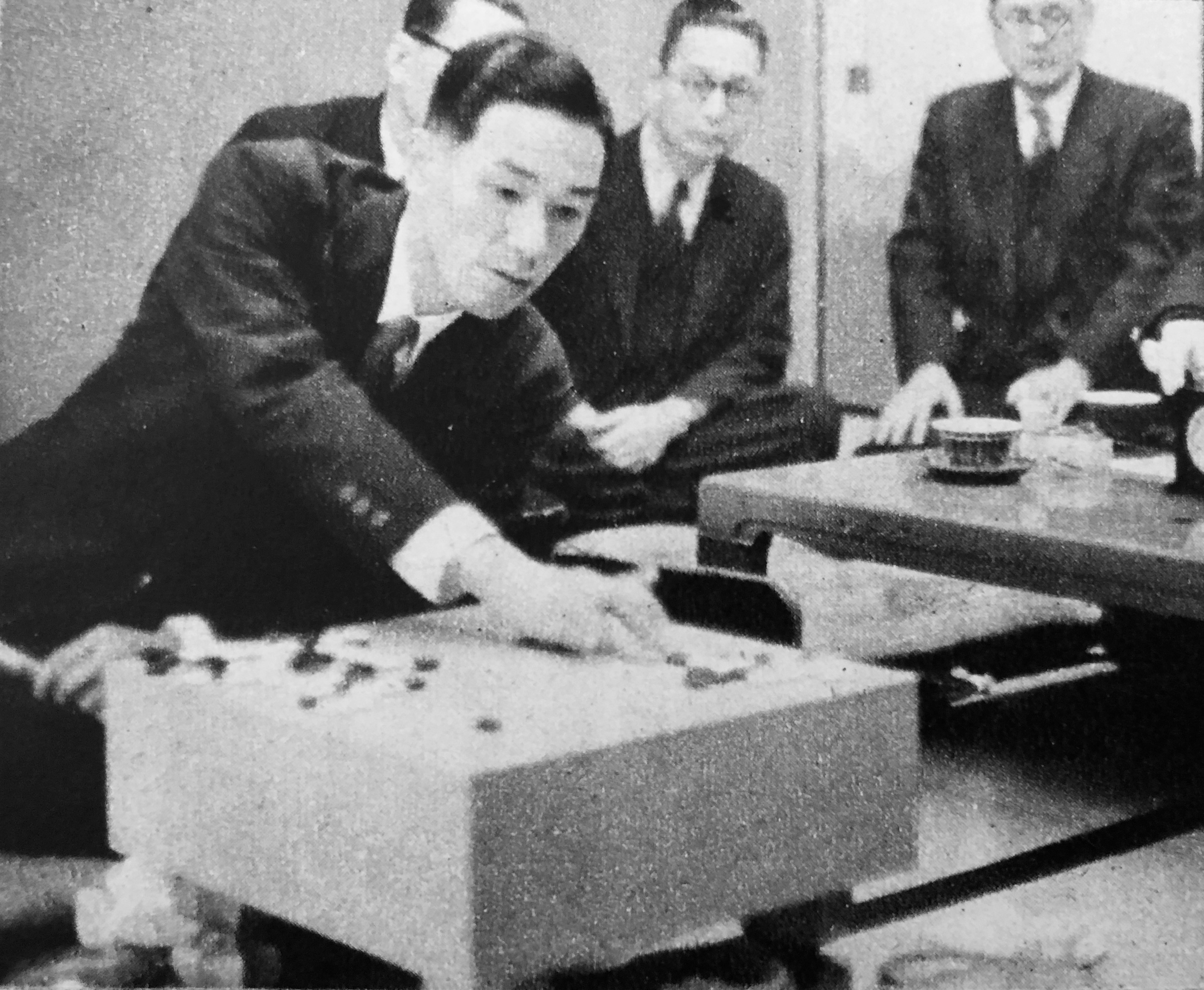
Sakata in 1955

Sakata became a professional Go player in 1935. His first title match was the Hon'inbō in 1951 when he challenged Hashimoto Utaro. More than usual was at stake in the match because Hashimoto played for the Kansai Ki-in, which Hashimoto had founded the year before. This put additional pressure on Sakata to win the title back for the Nihon Ki-in. Sakata started out well, winning three of the first four games, but Hashimoto fought back and won the final four games, and so kept the Hon'inbō title. Afterwards, Sakata went on to win a couple of small titles which were the start of a meteoric run of major wins in which he won almost all of the titles in Japan except the Hon'inbō. In 1961 he was once again the challenger for the Hon'inbō. His opponent, Takagawa Kaku, had held the title for nine years straight. Sakata won the Hon'inbō and held it for seven years in a row. Thus he became an honorary Honinbo, and was later called the 23rd Honinbo, with the name Honinbo Eiju. During his Honinbo reign, he also won the Meijin title in 1963, making Sakata the first player to simultaneously hold both titles (which at the time were the biggest titles in Japan). Sakata's strongest year was 1964, when he won 30 games and lost only two and held seven major titles: Meijin, Honinbo, Nihon Ki-in Championship, Asahi Pro Best Ten, Oza, Nihon Kiin#1, and NHK Cup.

Sakata's challenger for the 1965 Meijin was Rin Kaiho, who at the time was just 23 years old. Sakata was the overwhelming favorite, but Rin won the title. Sakata challenged two years in a row but could not win the Meijin back. Rin then went on to take the Hon'inbō from Sakata. Although Sakata suffered defeats for these top titles, he went on to win many other titles, including the Judan and Oza.

Sakata wrote many books in Japanese; several have been translated into English, including Modern Joseki and Fuseki, The Middle Game of Go, Tesuji and Anti-Suji of Go and Killer of Go.

Sakata died on October 22, 2010, at the age of 90.

== Titles and runners-up ==
Ranks #2 in total number of titles in Japan.

Domestic
Title	Wins	Runners-up
Meijin	2 (1963-1964)	4 (1965–1967, 1979)
Honinbō	7 (1961–1967)	4 (1951, 1968, 1970, 1975)
Oza	7 (1961, 1963-1964, 1966, 1970–1972)	3 (1956, 1968, 1973)
Judan	5 (1966–1968, 1972-1973)	3 (1969, 1974, 1977)
NEC Cup	1 (1983)	1 (1984)
NHK Cup	11 (1957–1959, 1961-1962, 1964-1965, 1972, 1976-1977, 1982)	2 (1956, 1970)
Nihon Ki-in Championship	12 (1955–1961, 1964-1965, 1973–1975)	2 (1962, 1966)
Asahi Pro Best Ten	3 (1964, 1967, 1969)	1 (1968)
Asahi Top Position	3 (1955, 1959, 1961)	2 (1957, 1960)
Hayago Meijin	1 (1956)	
Hayago Championship	1 (1981)	1 (1975)
Igo Senshuken	1 (1958)	
Oteai	6 (1937-1938, 1941, 1951, 1953-1954)	
Nihon Saikyo	2 (1959, 1961)	
Japan Asian Airlines Cup	2 (1979-1980)	
Igo Japan Series	1 (1976)	
Nihon Ki-in Daiichii	4 (1961, 1963-1965)	
Competition among the top three	1 (1952)	
Competition among the top four	1 (1962)	
Nihon Ki-in Highest Dan	1 (1951)	
Total	72	23

== Bibliography ==
- Modern Joseki and Fuseki, Vol. 1: Parallel Fuseki, Ishi Press 1968, reprinted 2006 ISBN 0-923891-75-7
- Modern Joseki and Fuseki, Vol. 2: The Opening Theory of Go, Ishi Press 1971, reprinted 2006 ISBN 0-923891-76-5
- The Middle Game of Go or "Chubansen", Ishi Press, 1971, ISBN 0-923891-77-3
