= Nihon Ki-in =

Japanese organizational body for Go

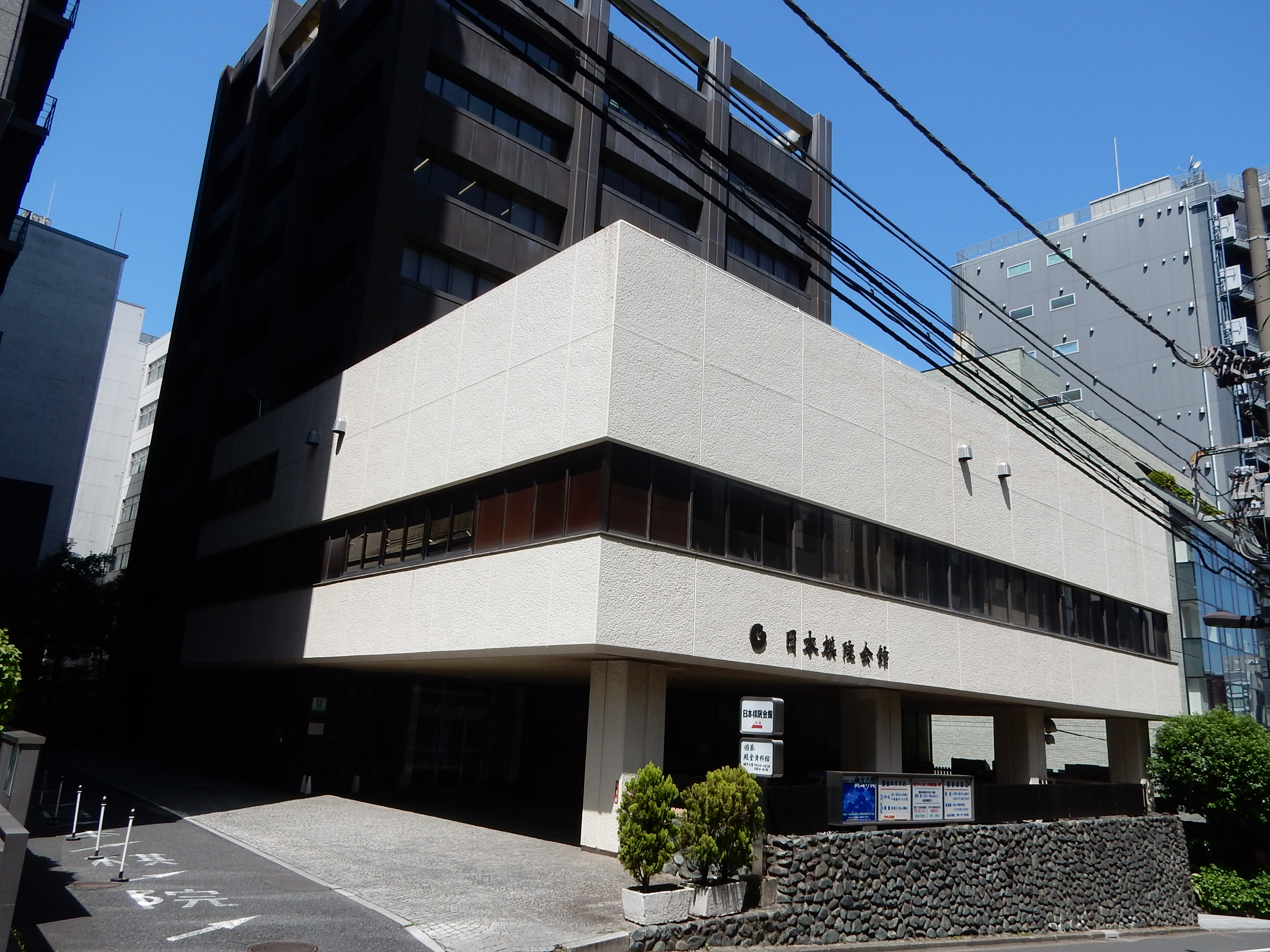
Nihon Ki-in headquarters, in Chiyoda, Tokyo

The Nihon Ki-in (日本棋院), also known as the Japan Go Association, is the main organizational body for Go in Japan, overseeing Japan's professional system and issuing diplomas for amateur dan rankings. It is based in Tokyo. The other major Go association in Japan is Kansai Ki-in. Its innovations include the Oteai system of promotion, time limits in professional games, and the introduction of issuing diplomas to strong amateur players, to affirm their ranks.

== History ==
The Nihon Ki-in was established in July 1924. The first president of the Nihon Ki-in was Makino Nobuaki, a great Go patron himself, with Okura Kishichiro serving as vice president. The vast majority of pros at the time joined the fledgling organization, excepting the Inoue faction in Osaka and Nozawa Chikucho. A brief splinter group called Kiseisha was created soon after the Nihon Ki-in was formed, but most of the players involved had returned to the Nihon Ki-in within a couple of years. Then in 1950, its western branch split away to form the Kansai Ki-in.

== Tournaments ==
The Nihon Ki-in organizes many tournaments for professional players. The major title tournaments include the Kisei, Meijin, Honinbo, Judan, Tengen, Gosei, and the Ōza. There are also separate Honinbo, Meijin, and Kisei titles for women.

== Major title winners by year ==
All names below are given in surname-first order.

(*): Kansai Ki-in player

Year	Kisei	Meijin	Honinbo	Judan	Tengen	Gosei	Ōza
1941	-	-	Sekiyama Riichi	-	-	-	-
1943	-	-	Hashimoto Utaro	-	-	-	-
1945	-	-	Iwamoto Kaoru	-	-	-	-
1947	-	-	Iwamoto Kaoru	-	-	-	-
1950	-	-	Hashimoto Utaro	-	-	-	-
1951	-	-	Hashimoto Utaro	-	-	-	-
1952	-	-	Takagawa Kaku	-	-	-	-
1953	-	-	Takagawa Kaku	-	-	-	Hashimoto Utaro^{*}
1954	-	-	Takagawa Kaku	-	-	-	Takagawa Kaku
1955	-	-	Takagawa Kaku	-	-	-	Hashimoto Utaro^{*}
1956	-	-	Takagawa Kaku	-	-	-	Hashimoto Utaro^{*}
1957	-	-	Takagawa Kaku	-	-	-	Shimamura Toshihiro
1958	-	-	Takagawa Kaku	-	-	-	Fujisawa Hosai
1959	-	-	Takagawa Kaku	-	-	-	Hashimoto Shoji^{*}
1960	-	-	Takagawa Kaku	-	-	-	Handa Dogen^{*}
1961	-	-	Sakata Eio	-	-	-	Sakata Eio
1962	-	Fujisawa Hideyuki	Sakata Eio	Hashimoto Utaro^{*}	-	-	Miyashita Hidehiro
1963	-	Sakata Eio	Sakata Eio	Handa Dogen	-	-	Sakata Eio
1964	-	Sakata Eio	Sakata Eio	Fujisawa Hosai	-	-	Sakata Eio
1965	-	Rin Kaiho	Sakata Eio	Takagawa Kaku	-	-	Handa Dogen^{*}
1966	-	Rin Kaiho	Sakata Eio	Sakata Eio	-	-	Sakata Eio
1967	-	Rin Kaiho	Sakata Eio	Sakata Eio	-	-	Fujisawa Hideyuki
1968	-	Takagawa Kaku	Rin Kaiho	Sakata Eio	-	-	Fujisawa Hideyuki
1969	-	Rin Kaiho	Rin Kaiho	Otake Hideo	-	-	Fujisawa Hideyuki
1970	-	Fujisawa Hideyuki	Rin Kaiho	-	-	-	Sakata Eio
1971	-	Rin Kaiho	Ishida Yoshio	Hashimoto Utaro^{*}	-	-	Sakata Eio
1972	-	Rin Kaiho	Ishida Yoshio	Sakata Eio	-	-	Sakata Eio
1973	-	Rin Kaiho	Ishida Yoshio	Sakata Eio	-	-	Rin Kaiho
1974	-	Ishida Yoshio	Ishida Yoshio	Hashimoto Shoji^{*}	-	-	Ishida Yoshio
1975	-	Otake Hideo	Ishida Yoshio	Rin Kaiho	Fujisawa Hideyuki	-	Otake Hideo
1976	-	Otake Hideo	Takemiya Masaki	Kato Masao	Kobayashi Koichi	Kato Masao	Cho Chikun
1977	Fujisawa Hideyuki	Rin Kaiho	Kato Masao	Kato Masao	Shimamura Toshihiro	Kato Masao	Kudo Norio
1978	Fujisawa Hideyuki	Otake Hideo	Kato Masao	Kato Masao	Kato Masao	Otake Hideo	Ishida Yoshio
1979	Fujisawa Hideyuki	Otake Hideo	Kato Masao	Kato Masao	Kato Masao	Cho Chikun	Kato Masao
1980	Fujisawa Hideyuki	Cho Chikun	Takemiya Masaki	Otake Hideo	Kato Masao	Otake Hideo	Kato Masao
1981	Fujisawa Hideyuki	Cho Chikun	Cho Chikun	Otake Hideo	Kato Masao	Otake Hideo	Hashimoto Shoji^{*}
1982	Fujisawa Hideyuki	Cho Chikun	Cho Chikun	Cho Chikun	Kataoka Satoshi	Otake Hideo	Kato Masao
1983	Cho Chikun	Cho Chikun	Rin Kaiho	Kato Masao	Kataoka Satoshi	Otake Hideo	Kato Masao
1984	Cho Chikun	Cho Chikun	Rin Kaiho	Kobayashi Koichi	Ishida Yoshio	Otake Hideo	Kato Masao
1985	Cho Chikun	Kobayashi Koichi	Takemiya Masaki	Kobayashi Koichi	Kobayashi Koichi	Otake Hideo	Kato Masao
1986	Kobayashi Koichi	Kato Masao	Takemiya Masaki	Kobayashi Koichi	Kobayashi Koichi	Cho Chikun	Kato Masao
1987	Kobayashi Koichi	Kato Masao	Takemiya Masaki	Kato Masao	Cho Chikun	Kato Masao	Kato Masao
1988	Kobayashi Koichi	Kobayashi Koichi	Takemiya Masaki	Cho Chikun	Cho Chikun	Kobayashi Koichi	Kato Masao
1989	Kobayashi Koichi	Kobayashi Koichi	Cho Chikun	Cho Chikun	Rin Kaiho	Kobayashi Koichi	Kato Masao
1990	Kobayashi Koichi	Kobayashi Koichi	Cho Chikun	Takemiya Masaki	Rin Kaiho	Kobayashi Koichi	Hane Yasumasa
1991	Kobayashi Koichi	Kobayashi Koichi	Cho Chikun	Takemiya Masaki	Rin Kaiho	Kobayashi Koichi	Fujisawa Hideyuki
1992	Kobayashi Koichi	Kobayashi Koichi	Cho Chikun	Takemiya Masaki	Rin Kaiho	Kobayashi Koichi	Fujisawa Hideyuki
1993	Kobayashi Koichi	Kobayashi Koichi	Cho Chikun	Otake Hideo	Rin Kaiho	Kobayashi Koichi	Kato Masao
1994	Cho Chikun	Kobayashi Koichi	Cho Chikun	Otake Hideo	Ryu Shikun	Rin Kaiho	Cho Chikun
1995	Kobayashi Satoru	Takemiya Masaki	Cho Chikun	Yoda Norimoto	Ryu Shikun	Kobayashi Satoru	O Rissei
1996	Cho Chikun	Cho Chikun	Cho Chikun	Yoda Norimoto	Ryu Shikun	Yoda Norimoto	Ryu Shikun
1997	Cho Chikun	Cho Chikun	Cho Chikun	Kato Masao	Kudo Norio	Yoda Norimoto	Yamada Kimio
1998	Cho Chikun	Cho Chikun	Cho Chikun	Hikosaka Naoto	Kobayashi Koichi	Yoda Norimoto	O Rissei
1999	Cho Chikun	Cho Chikun	Cho Sonjin	Kobayashi Koichi	Kobayashi Koichi	Kobayashi Koichi	O Rissei
2000	O Rissei	Yoda Norimoto	O Meien	Kobayashi Koichi	Ryu Shikun	Yamashita Keigo	O Rissei
2001	O Rissei	Yoda Norimoto	O Meien	O Rissei	Hane Naoki	Kobayashi Koichi	Cho Chikun
2002	O Rissei	Yoda Norimoto	Kato Masao	O Rissei	Hane Naoki	Kobayashi Koichi	O Meien
2003	Yamashita Keigo	Yoda Norimoto	Cho U	O Rissei	Hane Naoki	Yoda Norimoto	Cho U
2004	Hane Naoki	Cho U	Cho U	O Rissei	Yamashita Keigo	Yoda Norimoto	Cho U
2005	Hane Naoki	Cho U	Takao Shinji	Cho Chikun	Kono Rin	Yoda Norimoto	Cho U
2006	Yamashita Keigo	Takao Shinji	Takao Shinji	Cho Chikun	Kono Rin	Cho U	Yamashita Keigo
2007	Yamashita Keigo	Cho U	Takao Shinji	Cho Chikun	Kono Rin	Cho U	Yamashita Keigo
2008	Yamashita Keigo	Cho U	Hane Naoki	Takao Shinji	Cho U	Cho U	Cho U
2009	Yamashita Keigo	Iyama Yuta	Hane Naoki	Cho U	Yamashita Keigo	Cho U	Cho U
2010	Cho U	Iyama Yuta	Yamashita Keigo	Cho U	Yuki Satoshi^{*}	Sakai Hideyuki^{*}	Cho U
2011	Cho U	Yamashita Keigo	Yamashita Keigo	Iyama Yuta	Iyama Yuta	Hane Naoki	Cho U
2012	Cho U	Yamashita Keigo	Iyama Yuta	Iyama Yuta	Iyama Yuta	Iyama Yuta	Iyama Yuta
2013	Iyama Yuta	Iyama Yuta	Iyama Yuta	Yuki Satoshi	Iyama Yuta	Iyama Yuta	Iyama Yuta
2014	Iyama Yuta	Iyama Yuta	Iyama Yuta	Takao Shinji	Takao Shinji	Iyama Yuta	Murakawa Daisuke^{*}
2015	Iyama Yuta	Iyama Yuta	Iyama Yuta	Ida Atsushi	Iyama Yuta	Iyama Yuta	Iyama Yuta
2016	Iyama Yuta	Takao Shinji	Iyama Yuta	Iyama Yuta	Iyama Yuta	Iyama Yuta	Iyama Yuta
2017	Iyama Yuta	Iyama Yuta	Iyama Yuta	Iyama Yuta	Iyama Yuta	Iyama Yuta	Iyama Yuta
2018	Iyama Yuta	Cho U	Iyama Yuta	Iyama Yuta	Iyama Yuta	Kyo Kagen	Iyama Yuta
2019	Iyama Yuta	Shibano Toramaru	Iyama Yuta	Murakawa Daisuke^{*}	Iyama Yuta	Hane Naoki	Shibano Toramaru
2020	Iyama Yuta	Iyama Yuta	Iyama Yuta	Shibano Toramaru	Ichiriki Ryo	Ichiriki Ryo	Shibano Toramaru
2021	Iyama Yuta	Iyama Yuta	Iyama Yuta	Kyo Kagen	Seki Kotaro	Iyama Yuta	Iyama Yuta
2022	Ichiriki Ryo	Shibano Toramaru	Iyama Yuta	Kyo Kagen	Seki Kotaro	Iyama Yuta	Iyama Yuta
2023	Ichiriki Ryo	Shibano Toramaru	Ichiriki Ryo	Shibano Toramaru	Ichiriki Ryo	Iyama Yuta	Iyama Yuta
2024	Ichiriki Ryo	Ichiriki Ryo	Ichiriki Ryo	Iyama Yuta	Ichiriki Ryo	Iyama Yuta	Iyama Yuta
2025	Ichiriki Ryo	Ichiriki Ryo	Ichiriki Ryo	Shibano Toramaru	Ichiriki Ryo	Iyama Yuta	Ichiriki Ryo
2026	Shibano Toramaru			Shibano Toramaru			
Year	Kisei	Meijin	Honinbo	Judan	Tengen	Gosei	Ōza

== Organization ==
- Tokyo Headquarters (Ichigaya): 7-2 Goban-cho, Chiyoda-ku, Tokyo
- Tokyo Yurakucho Igo Center: 9F Tokyo Kotsu-Kaikan, 2-10-1 Yuraku-cho, Chiyoda-ku, Tokyo
- Osaka Headquarters: 10F Applause Tower, 19-19 Sayamachi, Osaka
- Osaka Umeda Igo Salon: 6F Hankyu Five Annex Building, 1-23 Sumidacho, Kita-ku, Osaka
- Chubu Headquarters: 1-19 Syumoku-cho, Higashi-ku, Nagoya
- The Nihon Ki-in European Go Cultural Centre: Schokland14,1181 HV Amstelveen, Netherlands
- Nihon Ki-in Do Brasil: R. Dr Fabricio Vampre No116, Ana Rosa - São Paulo - Brazil
- Nihon Ki-in Go Institute of The West U.S.A.: 700 N.E., 45th Street, Seattle WA

== See also ==
- International Go Federation
- List of professional Go tournaments
- All Japan Student Go Federation
- Hanguk Kiwon (Korean Go Association)
- Zhongguo Qiyuan (governing body for mind game organizations, including Chinese Go Association)
- Taiwan Chi-Yuan (Taiwanese Go Association)
- Hoensha
- American Go Association
- British Go Association
- Irish Go Association
- European Go Federation
- Singapore Weiqi Association
- Hong Kong Go Association
- New Zealand Go Society
