= Minoru Kitani =

Japanese Go player

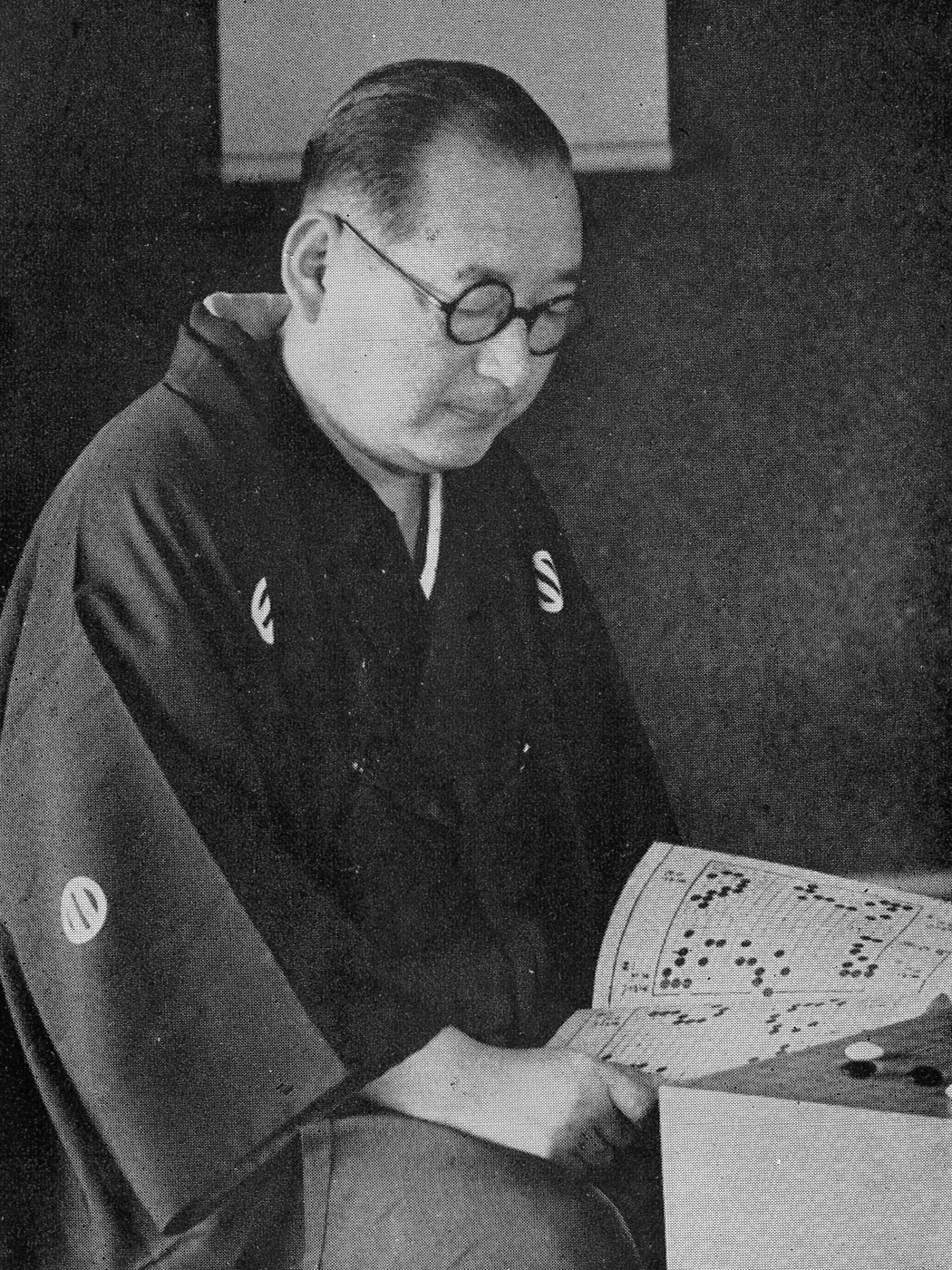

Personal information
- Native name: 木谷実 (Japanese)
- Full name: Minoru Kitani
- Born: January 25, 1909 Kobe, Japan
- Died: December 19, 1975 (aged 66) Japan

Sport
- Turned pro: 1924
- Teacher: Tamejiro Suzuki
- Pupil: List of Minoru Kitani pupils
- Rank: 9 Dan

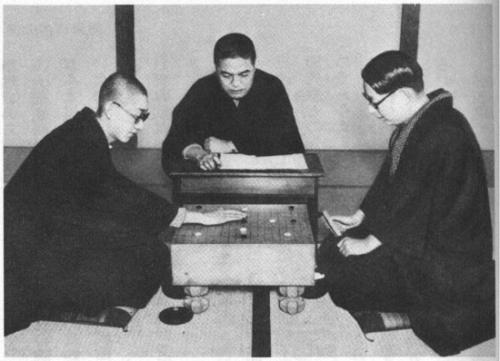
Go Seigen playing with Kitani Minoru (on the right)

Minoru Kitani (木谷 実, Kitani Minoru; January 25, 1909 – December 19, 1975) was one of the most celebrated professional Go players and teachers of the game of Go in the twentieth century in Japan.

== Biography ==
He earned the nickname "the Prodigy" after winning a knockout tournament. He defeated eight opponents from the Kiseisha in a row during 1928. He played a celebrated match with then retiring Honinbō Shūsai. The Nobel Prize winning author Kawabata Yasunari used this game in his novel "The Master of Go". In 1954 he suffered a cerebral hemorrhage, but soon recovered. His condition came back in 1964, after which he retired from professional play. He was given the Okura Prize in 1967.

Segoe Kensaku, a friend and rival of Kitani, nicknamed him "the Great Kitani" due to his extraneous efforts relating to Go.

== Relationship with Go Seigen ==
Kitani was a young prodigy who quickly attracted attention after the founding, in 1924, of the Nihon Ki-in. He became a great rival and friend of Go Seigen after the latter was brought to Japan from China.

Go and Kitani were the vanguard of the Shinfuseki or "New Opening" theory, a period roughly 1933-6 which saw great innovations in Go opening theory.

In 1939, Go Seigen and Kitani played in the Kamakura jubango, the most celebrated jubango of the century. It ended in Go Seigen's decisive victory. Kitani's career never quite recovered; he was also hampered by bad health, in the form of a heart condition. He was later noted for a style of spectacular idiosyncrasy, with great emphasis on secure territory.

Go and Kitani later lived only a few minutes walk apart, and Go Seigen's daughters studied Go in Kitani Dojo's amateur branch for children. Kitani had his stroke when he was chatting with Go. Kitani died six months after.

Izumi Kobayashi, Kitani's granddaughter and a top female Go player, married Cho U, the student of Go's student Rin Kaiho.

== Kitani dojo ==
Kitani was subsequently noted as the most prolific teacher ever of future professional players. The Kitani dojo, which began to flourish after 1945 in the Kitani house in the countryside, was in practical terms run by his wife, produced a whole generation of top players who would dominate Japanese go from the early 1970s to mid-1990s. His own daughter Reiko (1939–1996) reached 6 dan and won the All-Japan Women's Championship several times, and married one of his best students, Koichi Kobayashi. Their child, Izumi Kobayashi, Kitani's granddaughter, is now one of Japan's current leading female players. At the time of his death, he had taught over 60 students, 40 of whom went on to become professionals. The total dan rank of all his students add up to over 250.

== Promotion Record ==
Rank	Year	Notes
1 dan	1924	
2 dan	1926	
3 dan	1926	
4 dan	1927	
5 dan	1929	
6 dan	1933	
7 dan	1935	
8 dan	1942	
9 dan	1956	

== Titles & runners-up ==
Title	Years Held
Current	1
(Japan) NHK Cup	1960
Defunct	2
(Japan) Asashi Top Position	1957, 1958

Title	Years Lost
Current	5
(Japan) Honinbo	1947, 1953, 1959
(Japan) NHK Cup	1958, 1961
Defunct	3
(Japan) NHK Championship	1958
(Japan) Asashi Top Position	1959
(Japan) Igo Senshuken	1958
