= Utaro Hashimoto =

Japanese Go player

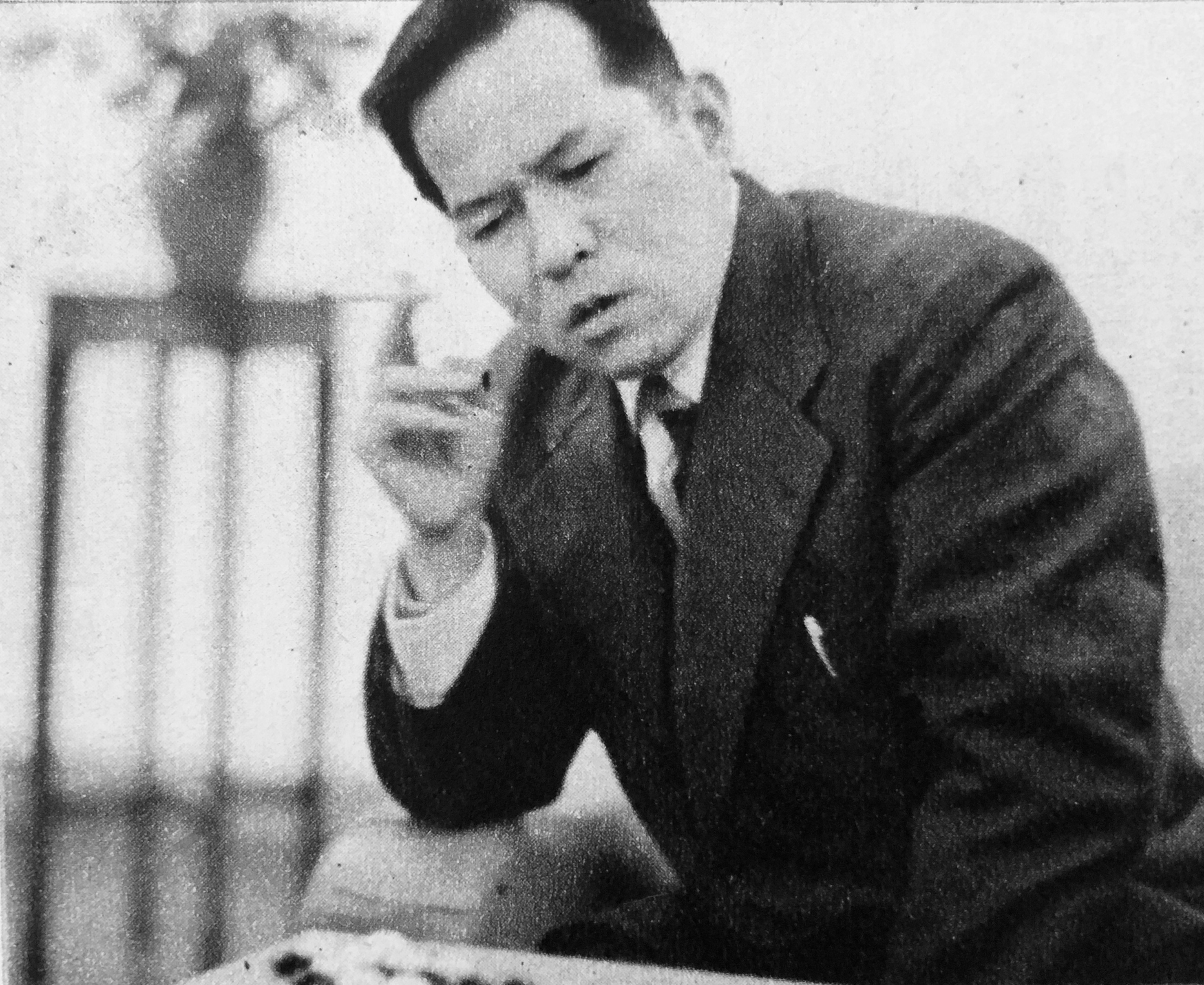
- Utaro Hashimoto in 1955

Personal information
- Native name: 橋本宇太郎 (Japanese)
- Full name: Utaro Hashimoto
- Born: February 27, 1907 Osaka, Japan
- Died: July 24, 1994 (aged 87) Japan

Sport
- Teacher: Segoe Kensaku
- Rank: 9 dan

Utaro Hashimoto (橋本 宇太郎, Hashimoto Utarō; February 27, 1907 – July 24, 1994) was a 9-dan professional Go player.

== Biography ==
Hashimoto became a pro in 1922 when he was 15. He won the Honinbō 3 times before finally reaching 9p in 1954. He founded the Kansai Ki-in in 1950.

His opponent was Iwamoto Kaoru in the so-called 'Atomic Bomb Game', played Aug. 4-6 in the outskirts of Hiroshima and interrupted by the dropping of the first atomic bomb before being resumed.

== Titles and runners-up ==
Domestic
Title	Wins	Runners-up
Kisei		1 (1977)
Honinbo	3 (1943, 1950, 1951)	2 (1945, 1952)
Judan	2 (1962, 1971)	2 (1963, 1972)
Oza	3 (1953, 1955, 1956)	2 (1971, 1972)
NHK Cup	2 (1956, 1963)	1 (1962)
Kansai Ki-in Championship	3 (1968, 1969, 1980)	
Hayago Championship	1 (1970)	1 (1971)
Asahi Pro Best Ten	1 (1970)	
Total	15	9
