= Kansai Ki-in =

Japanese go organization

The Kansai Ki-in (関西棋院), i.e., Kansai Go Association, is an organizational body for the game of Go in Japan, which was founded by Hashimoto Utaro in 1950. Though it is not as large as its chief rival, the Nihon Ki-in, it also issues diplomas to strong players and oversees professionals as the Nihon Ki-in does.

World War II created great difficulties in traveling from the Osaka region to Tokyo for Nihon Ki-in events. The Nihon Ki-in created a western branch, but when a dispute over the Honinbo title arose in 1950, this branch declared its independence.

== Notable members ==
- Daisuke Murakawa
- Dogen Handa
- Hideyuki Sakai
- Manfred Wimmer
- Satoshi Yuki
- Shoji Hashimoto

== See also ==
- International Go Federation
- List of professional Go tournaments
- Nihon Ki-in (Japanese Go Association)
  - All Japan Student Go Federation
- Hanguk Kiwon (Korean Go Association)
- Zhongguo Qiyuan (Chinese Go Association)
- Taiwan Chi-Yuan (Taiwanese Go Association)
- Hoensha
- American Go Association
