= Nihon Ki-in Hall of Fame =

The Nihon Ki-in Hall of Fame was created in 2004 as part of the Nihon Ki-in's 80th anniversary celebrations, and housed in the basement of its headquarters in Ichigaya.

Inductees are selected by the eight-member Go Hall of Fame Awards Committee, of which Otake Hideo, the Nihon Ki-in chairman, and Rin Kaiho, the Professional Go Players Association chairman, are both members. According to the Nihon Ki-in, those inducted need not be the most renowned players, since even "non-professionals who have contributed to the development of Go will also be honoured."

== Inductees ==
Listed in reverse chronological order.

=== 2024 ===
- Yasuro Kikuchi
- Rin Kaiho
- Otake Hideo

=== 2023 ===
- Nakamura Dōseki
- Makino Nobuaki
- Kato Masao

=== 2022 ===
- Yasunari Kawabata

=== 2021 ===
- Takagawa Kaku

=== 2020 ===
- Hideyuki Fujisawa

=== 2019 ===
- Eio Sakata
- Cho Nam-chul

=== 2018 ===
- Matsutarō Shōriki

=== 2017 ===
- Masaoka Shiki

=== 2016 ===
- Kanren (寛蓮)
- Inoue Gennan Inseki

=== 2015 ===
- Go Seigen

=== 2014 ===
- Utaro Hashimoto

=== 2013 ===
- Kita Fumiko

=== 2012 ===
- Yasui Santetsu
- Chen Yi

=== 2011 ===
- Iwamoto Kaoru

=== 2010 ===
- Kitani Minoru

=== 2009 ===
- Segoe Kensaku

=== 2008 ===
- Honinbo Shuei
- Honinbo Shusai

=== 2007 ===
- Honinbo Shuho

=== 2006 ===
- Honinbo Shuwa
- Baron Okura Kishichiro

=== 2005 ===
- Honinbo Jowa

=== 2004 ===
- Honinbo Sansa
- Honinbo Dosaku
- Honinbo Shusaku
- Tokugawa Ieyasu
