= List of Hikaru no Go episodes =

This is a list of episodes for the anime series Hikaru no Go. This lists every episode, starting with the English title as they aired on Toonami Jetstream, followed by the title that was used on the original Japanese episode on TV Tokyo. The anime more or less follows the same storyline as the manga. A short summary follows, introducing the episode and referring to some of the gags. There are a total of 75 episodes, excluding a 2004 special showing what happens after episode 75. The final three episodes were released in English dub February 2011 when the series was put up for download on the iTunes store.

== Episode list ==
No.	Title	Original release date	English air date
1	"Eternal Rivals"; Transliteration: "Eternal Rival" (Japanese: 永遠のライバル)	10 October 2001	14 July 2006
Hikaru Shindo goes to the shed of his grandfather, Heihachi Shindo, in hopes of finding antiques to sell. He stumbles upon a go board which is possessed by the ancient spirit of Fujiwara-no-Sai, a Go Master from the Heian period who had before appeared to Hon'inbō Shūsaku. Sai ends up accompanying Hikaru and traveling with him, however he is disappointed when Hikaru refuses to play Go. Eventually, Hikaru agrees to play Go, and his first opponent is Akira Toya, the son of the national champion. With Sai's instructions, Hikaru manages to win the match, much to the surprise of Akira.: Game based on (Sai): Hon'inbō Dōsaku vs. Yasui Chitetsu (1669); Game based on (Hikaru): Hon'inbō Shūsaku vs. Hon'inbō Shūwa (1851)
2	"The Key Point"; Transliteration: "Discovered Weakness!!" (Japanese: 見ぬかれた急所!!)	17 October 2001	24 July 2006
Hikaru enrolls in a Go class to learn more about the game, and he is followed by his childhood friend Akari Fujisaki. When a bullying Go player arrives, Sai insists on challenging him, but Hikaru ends up getting them kicked out, so he decides to go to the Children's Go Tournament. Meanwhile, Akira cannot help but to think of the problems that occurred after his first match with Hikaru. When he hears Hikaru may be at the Children's Go Tournament, he decides to investigate, yearning for a chance of a rematch.
3	"Akira Bares His Fangs"; Transliteration: "Akira Bares His Fangs" (Japanese: 牙をむくアキラ)	24 October 2001	31 July 2006
Akira confronts Hikaru and is insulted when Hikaru shows disrespect for the game. He challenges Hikaru to a rematch, and Sai notes that Akira is "baring his fangs." Sai must decide whether to go easy or crush Akira. In the end, Akira resigns from the match after realizing he has lost. Hikaru later encounters Toya Meijin, Akira's father, who challenges him to a match, allowing Hikaru to finally understand the intensity of Go.
4	"Kaga of the Shogi Club"; Transliteration: "Kaga of the Shogi Club" (Japanese: 将棋部の加賀)	31 October 2001	7 August 2006
Akari invites Hikaru to the Haze Junior High Festival, where a Junior High Go Tournament is taking place. After watching a match where Kimihiro Tsutsui, the head of the Haze Junior High Go Club, is holding a competition, Hikaru learns that the prize is a book called Assorted Tsumego (Life and death Go problems) from Toya Mejin's Matches. Sai desires to win the book, but first he must get past the shogi captain Tetsuo Kaga. Hikaru makes a fatal mistake in the match, causing much of his stones to be captured.: Game based on: Karigane Junichi vs. Honinbo Shusai (The Famous Killing Game of 1926)
5	"An Inkling of an Awakening"; Transliteration: "Prediction of an Awakening" (Japanese: 覚醒の予感)	7 November 2001	14 August 2006
After losing his match to Kaga by half a point, Hikaru is offered the chance to play Go on the school team squad. When he is able to replay a game between two players from memory, Sai begins to realize a great potential could be inside, a potential as good as that of Akira. While Kaga has defeated his opponent, Hikaru fails to win his match. It is up to Kimihiro to advance the team to the next round.
6	"A Game of Beauty"; Transliteration: "The Beautiful Match" (Japanese: 美しい一局)	14 November 2001	21 August 2006
Hikaru, Kimihiro, and Kaga make it all the way to the tournament finals, but little does Hikaru know that Akira is visiting the same school he attends. As though that is not enough pressure, they still must try and not get caught for having an ineligible player on their team. Sai does his best to assist Hikaru in his current game. Nonetheless, even after the three win the tournament, the Haze Go Club is eventually caught, forfeiting the trophy to the Kaio Go Club.
7	"I'm Not Going to Play You"; Transliteration: "I Won't Play Against You" (Japanese: お前とは打たない)	21 November 2001	5 September 2006
While Hikaru now attends Haze Middle School, Akira attends Kaio Middle School. Hikaru is trying to start a Go club in his school. Akira pays a visit to Hikaru, challenging him to a match. Hikaru declines the challenge. Akari decides to hang out with Hikaru in the Haze Go Club. Akira plays a match with Yun Sensei at the Kaio Go Club, in which having Hikaru's name mentioned reminds him of his motivation.
8	"Rainy Day Strategy"; Transliteration: "The Scheme in the Rain" (Japanese: 雨の中の策略)	28 November 2001	19 September 2006
Akira is too good against everyone at the Kaio Go club, and most members are envious of this. One new student named Okumura tries the mirror go technique, only to resign after some of his stones were captured. Okumura, along with Kojima and Ito, plan to take him down by forcing him to play Blindfold Go.
9	"Eyesore"; Transliteration: "An Irritating Guy!!" (Japanese: 目ざわりな奴!!)	5 December 2001	2 October 2006
A challenge to a double match of Blindfold Go is called into question, as Akira is still very loathed in the Kaio Go Club. It is Yuri Hidaka who prevents Akira from playing a ridiculous variation of the game any longer. Meanwhile, the Haze Go Club is still searching for a third member to join.
10	"The Third Player"; Transliteration: "The Third Member" (Japanese: 3人目のメンバー)	12 December 2001	16 October 2006
A boy named Yuki Mitani solves a challenging problem on the posters advertised by the Haze Go Club. Hikaru knows they badly need a third member in order to be able to compete as a team, and tries to convince Yuki to join. However, he soon discovers Yuki's true strength, one of deception.
11	"A Very Despicable Act"; Transliteration: "The Most Inconsiderate Act" (Japanese: 最も卑劣な行為)	19 December 2001	30 October 2006
Yuki goes to a Go salon to gamble for winning games, but has a habit of cheating. Shu, the owner of the Go salon, hires Dake, a skilled player who pretends not to know much about Go, only to teach Yuki a lesson. Unfortunately, Yuki falls for the trick and ends up betting ten thousand yen. Hikaru later challenges Dake to a match to win back the ten thousand yen.
12	"No Cheating Allowed"; Transliteration: "You Are the Third Player" (Japanese: 三将はお前だ)	2 January 2002	13 November 2006
After Hikaru returns the money back to him, Yuki decides to join the club, but refuses to play in the tournament. Kimihiro explains how strong the Kaio Go Club is, to convince Yuki otherwise. Meanwhile, Akira discovers that Hikaru is the third position in the tournament and begs Yun Sensei to put him there. Yet Akira is assigned the captain and Kaoru Kishimoto is assigned the co-captain, much to the dismay of the former. Akira may be willing to give up all his pride and his reputation just to play against Hikaru.
13	"A Personal Resolve"; Transliteration: "Various Decisions" (Japanese: それぞれの決意)	9 January 2002	27 November 2006
Hikaru learns that Akira intentionally begged for the third position so he could play Sai. Now Hikaru must battle his own emotions to determine whether or not he or Sai will battle Akira in the second round. Meanwhile, Yuki decides to start his own rivalry up with Kishimoto.
14	"The Third Match"; Transliteration: "The Third Match" (Japanese: 三度目の対局)	16 January 2002	11 December 2006
Sai begins the match against Akira, and he realizes that Akira has gotten stronger, but halfway through the match, Hikaru begins to wonder how much he has improved in skill. As a result, he takes over in the middle of the match, only to resign in the end, though making some sound moves. Akira leaves determined to become a professional and forgets the past, but Hikaru begins to wonder how he can make amends. Both Kimihiro and Yuki eventually lose their matches against the Kaio Go Club as well.: Game based on: Hon'inbō Shūho vs. Hon'inbō Shūsaku (1860)
15	"The Ghost in the Net"; Transliteration: "The Player Hiding in the Net" (Japanese: ネットに潜む棋士)	23 January 2002	26 December 2006
Hikaru feels guilty for ignoring Sai's instructions in the previous Go match, but he discovers a new way to entertain Sai when he learns he can play Go through the Internet. Hikaru allows Sai to play Go against any opponent around the world, being able to beat top amateurs.
16	"Who Is Sai?"; Transliteration: "Who Is Sai?" (Japanese: sai はだれだ)	30 January 2002	8 January 2007
Sai quickly becomes an internet sensation after he wins game after game. Even Yoshitaka Waya, a leading insei, is shocked to have lost a match against Sai, and even thinks his own teacher, 9-dan professional Morishita, would not stand a chance. Some of the top amateurs headed toward Japan for the International Amateur Go Tournament also want to discover who Sai is. Waya goes out of his way to find Sai in the tournament, but to no avail.
17	"Déjà Vu"; Transliteration: "The Match of Revelation" (Japanese: 追憶の一局)	6 February 2002	22 January 2007
At the tournament, players who have followed Sai's games on the internet realize that others are also trying to discover his identity. Several players say that Sai is stronger than any other player they had faced. A Korean player informs the rest that his friend Yu, a 7-dan pro, lost to Sai so he cannot be an amateur. Though Waya believes that Sai is a child, Seiji Ogata says that he is the spirit of the legendary Go player Hon'inbō Shūsaku, (which is technically true, as Sai was the spirit behind Shusaku) recognizing his increased skill in every online game. The commotion catches Akira's attention, and after playing an online game with Sai, he is strongly reminded one of his previous matches with Hikaru. After Akira resigns from the online match, Waya becomes irritated by this.
18	"Akira vs. Sai"; Transliteration: "Akira vs. Sai" (Japanese: アキラ対sai)	13 February 2002	5 February 2007
Akira skips his first match of the Go professional exam in order to play an internet game against Sai. Along with the many people watching their game, Akira wonders who Sai really is, suspecting that Hikaru might be him. Akira interrogates Hikaru whether or not he is playing Go as Sai online. He is discouraged when Hikaru fails to reveal the truth.: Game based on: Kimu Hyonjon vs. Satoru Kobayashi (1998)
19	"Hikaru's True Strength"; Transliteration: "Hikaru's Strength" (Japanese: ヒカルの実力)	20 February 2002	20 February 2007
Since Hikaru tells Sai that he should not play Internet Go as a precaution, Hikaru eventually convinces his grandfather to buy him a Go board. Hikaru and Sai start playing head-to-head, much to the frustration of the former. When Hikaru is viewed to be a professional Go player in training, others begin to see him as a new challenge. Kishimoto encounters Hikaru and challenges him to a match.
20	"The Road to Turning Pro"; Transliteration: "The Road to Pro" (Japanese: プロへの道)	27 February 2002	5 March 2007
When Hikaru and Kishimoto are playing their match, the latter mentions how he never understood how Hikaru could be a rival to Akira. This causes Hikaru to set a new goal to become a professional Go player. In doing so, he must first become an insei. Hikaru crosses paths with Ogata when applying for an insei test, though he has to keep track of a game record. One thing Hikaru has failed to realize is that once he is enrolled as an insei, he may no longer compete in amateur tournaments with the club.: Game based on: Oka Nobumitsu vs. Umeki Suguru (1996)
21	"The Haze Middle School Go Club"; Transliteration: "The Haze Junior High Go Club" (Japanese: 葉瀬中囲碁部)	6 March 2002	19 March 2007
Hikaru faces against Kimihiro, Kaga, and Yuki in simultaneous matches, all to determine if he is worthy enough to enroll as an insei and retire from the Go club. Both Kimihiro and Yuki are defeated, and Kaga has won his match. All three permit him to take the insei test.: Game based on: Satoshi Yuki vs. Cho Hun-hyun (1997)
22	"The Insei Test"; Transliteration: "The Insei Examination" (Japanese: 院生試験)	13 March 2002	2 April 2007
Hikaru is about to pass the insei test, enrolling him as an insei the following month. Hikaru is careless to mention to the other insei that he has rivaled Akira. Things takes a turn for the worse as Hikaru loses two matches on the first day at the insei institution. He later finds out from Shinichiro Isumi that Kishimoto was a former B-league insei, something very unexpected to Hikaru.
23	"The Championship Room"; Transliteration: "The Room of Yuugen" (Japanese: 幽玄の間)	20 March 2002	16 April 2007
Akira learns that Hikaru has made it to the insei level, urging him to turn professional permanently to show his unbeaten skill. Meanwhile, Hikaru must progress through the insei ranks, though inexperienced in strategy. Akira is to face off against the Oza title-holder in the championship room.
24	"Akira vs. The Oza"; Transliteration: "Ouza vs. Akira" (Japanese: 王座vsアキラ)	27 March 2002	23 April 2007
Akira begins making restless moves to prove to Hikaru that he will be soon undefeated. Waya and Isumi replay the match for Hikaru, who is intrigued by Akira's strategy. Akira's plan may have backfired during the course of the match, costing his victory against the Oza.: Game based on: Rin Kono vs. Michihiro Morita (1996)
25	"Fear and Impatience"; Transliteration: "Fear and Impatience" (Japanese: 恐れとあせりと)	3 April 2002	30 April 2007
Hikaru has hit a stumbling block, unable to improve despite playing against Sai everyday. Since Hikaru is on a losing streak, Sai reveals that Hikaru has become afraid. Sai tells him to alter that fear into courage, in an attempt to become stronger.: Game based on: Chang Hao vs. Lee Chang-ho (1998)
26	"Welcome to the A-League"; Transliteration: "Welcome to Class 1" (Japanese: ようこそ一組へ)	10 April 2002	7 May 2007
Hikaru plays a match with Fukui, being able to defeat him. As Hikaru prepares to play against Waya, the latter talks about Sai's Go matches online. However, Waya soon learns that Hikaru knew about his online conversation with Sai. He wonders if there is more to Hikaru than meets the eye. Hikaru manages to become an A-league insei, joining Kosuke Ochi, Waya, Isumi, Toshinori Honda, Asumi Nase, Yuta Fukui, and others. He gets ready for the upcoming Young Lion's Tournament, in which the lower-league professionals play against the higher-league insei.: Game based on: Hon'inbō Shūsaku vs. Kadono Chuzaemon (1843)
27	"A Place to Return"; Transliteration: "A Place You Want to Return Sometimes" (Japanese: 時々戻りたい場所)	17 April 2002	14 May 2007
Hikaru visits the Haze Go Club, only to find out that Yuki left the club. Hikaru play simultaneous matches with the remaining members of the club. Yuki has been disappointed since Hikaru left to become an insei, glimpsing at him for daring to drop by. Yuki must battle his feelings and choose whether or not to rejoin the Go club. After finding game recordings of all the members, including himself, he is convinced to return to the club.
28	"The Young Lion's Tournament"; Transliteration: "The Wakajishisen" (Japanese: 若獅子戦)	24 April 2002	21 May 2007
Hikaru enters into the Young Lion's Tournament, along with other A-League insei. Sai sees Hikaru make a blunder during a match against Shinichi Murakami, yet Shindo is able to turn the tables. Ochi, Isumi, and Adachi win their matches, but the others lose. The result of Hikaru's match is yet to be seen.: Game based on: Shuzo Awaji vs. Satoshi Kataoka (1981)
29	"Kuwabara Hon'inbo"; Transliteration: "Kuwabara Honinbou" (Japanese: 桑原本因坊)	1 May 2002	29 May 2007
Hikaru lost his match by six and a half points. Ogata, who witnessed the match, tells Akira how Hikaru turned the mistake he had made to his advantage. Kuwabara Honinbo senses a strange presence when briefly crossing paths with Hikaru. As Ogata prepares for the seventh and final match of the series with Kuwabara, the former mentions that a new wave of young professionals will soon arise.
30	"Ogata vs. The Hon'inbo"; Transliteration: "Ogata vs. Honinbou" (Japanese: 绪方vs本因坊)	8 May 2002	4 June 2007
Hikaru decides to let Sai duel against Kadowaki, a cocky player and wannabe professional. Meanwhile, Ogata and Kuwabara are both eager to welcome the next generation of Go players, but once Ogata plays a sealed move he realizes he may not be able to pull out the win. Sai wins his match against Kadowaki, so he decides to re-train for another year.: Game based on (Hikaru): Hon'inbō Shūsaku vs. Nakagawa Junsetsu (1981); Game based on (Ogata): Rin Kaiho vs. Yoshio Ishida (1973)
31	"The Awful Opponent"; Transliteration: "The Pro Exam Starts" (Japanese: プロ試験開始)	15 May 2002	11 June 2007
Hikaru must win three games in the preliminary rounds of the professional exam to advance to the final rounds. In order to do that, he is to face a man named Tsubaki, a large loud motorcyclist. Before it was lunchtime, Tsubaki sealed his move, intimidating Hikaru. It was due to inexperience that Hikaru was unaware of the factor concerning the move before a break, causing him to lose the match. This intimidation put Hikaru on edge during his second preliminary round.
32	"The Last Day of the Prelims"; Transliteration: "The Last Day of the Preliminaries" (Japanese: 予選最終日)	22 May 2002	18 June 2007
Though Hikaru is pressured after losing his first two matches, he is about to have two consecutive wins and a luck of the draw. He, along with his companions all make it to the final rounds. Waya and Isumi decide to help Hikaru gain experience against adults to better prepare him for the final rounds.
33	"We're a Team"; Transliteration: "Team Formed!" (Japanese: チーム結成!)	29 May 2002	25 June 2007
Hikaru, Waya, and Isumi form a team to play at a Go salon, in which the three will have their entrance fee waived if they can manage to tie a series of three games as a team. After playing and winning at another Go salon, the three go to a sushi bar to celebrate their victories.: Game based on (Kawai): Yoshio Ishida vs. Shuichi Yoshida (1998); Game based on (Isumi): Hayashi Sano vs. Hon'inbō Shūho (1881); Game based on (Waya): Takeda Itsuko vs. Hon'inbō Shūsai (1911); Game based on (Hikaru): Sendai Jiseibo vs. Hon'inbō Dōsaku (1682)
34	"No Winning Allowed"; Transliteration: "You Mustn't Win" (Japanese: 勝ってはならない)	5 June 2002	9 July 2007
Akira takes the stage in a teaching game, playing four simultaneous matches, being instructed to lose to a rude and boorish supporter. Meanwhile, Hikaru is learning how to intentionally call a draw during his simultaneous matches, a skill needed to be obtained to calculate the moves of the opponent. Remarkably Akira is able to call a draw in all four matches, calling into question his cunning abilities.
35	"Only One can Win"; Transliteration: "There is Only One Winner" (Japanese: 勝者はひとり)	12 June 2002	23 July 2007
Hikaru, Waya, and Isumi head to a Korean Go salon, running into a young Korean boy named Suyong Hong. This boy wants to become a professional Go player, but is on a losing streak. Hikaru soon learns that Korea has been dominating Japan in the Go world, and decides to face Suyong to prove his worthiness.: Game based on: Yi Cheong-weon vs. Yun Yeong-seon (1995)
36	"My Name Is..."; Transliteration: "My Name Is..." (Japanese: オレの名は)	19 June 2002	6 August 2007
Hikaru and Suyong face off to see which insei is truly better. Yun Sensei drops by and recognizes that he has seen Hikaru play two highly contrasting matches before. Hikaru makes a seemingly bad move during the match, but unbeknownst to Suyong he was thinking much further ahead. In the end, the move proves to leave Hikaru triumphant in the match. Yun Sensei compliments Hikaru by acknowledging his strength in this game compared to the two previous games he had witnessed.
37	"The Pro Exam Begins"; Transliteration: "The Beginning of the Real Battle" (Japanese: 本戦開始)	26 June 2002	20 August 2007
The professional exam has finally begun, though the intensity reaches new heights after the pairings are chosen. Hikaru is very calm, cool, and collected for this, having gained experience in the team battles with Waya and Isumi. Hikaru is able to win six matches in a row.: Game based on: Kawamoto Noboru vs. Miwa Yoshiro (1989)
38	"The Challengers"; Transliteration: "The Challengers" (Japanese: 挑戦者たち)	3 July 2002	4 September 2007
During the lunch break of his match with Tsubaki, Hikaru learns that many players have struggled with education and occupation when trying to take the professional exam. At this point, after his match, Hikaru has eight wins and one loss. Akira has agreed to give private lessons to Ochi in an attempt to learn how strong a level Hikaru is playing at. However, Ochi figures this out and refuses to be taught by the likes of him.
39	"An Ill-Fated Moment"; Transliteration: "The Demonic Moment" (Japanese: 魔の一瞬)	10 July 2002	17 September 2007
On the twelfth day, with only one loss still, Hikaru is to face against an undefeated Isumi. The latter becomes anxious after learning from Ochi that Akira is after Hikaru and goes into overtime. Despite this, Isumi begins to dominate the match until he accidentally makes a bad move while under pressure, but illegally changes it before passing the turn. Hikaru must decide whether to ignore the rules violation and finish the match or call Isumi out.: Game based on: Miyazaki Shimako vs. Kikuyo Aoki (1990)
40	"Where are the Victories?"; Transliteration: "Whereabouts of a Win" (Japanese: 白星の行方)	17 July 2002	1 October 2007
Isumi resigns from the match from guilt before Hikaru can ask Isumi about the rules violation. Both of them begin losing matches due to regrets left behind in that last match. After thirteen days, Hikaru has his second loss to Fukui, but afterwards makes a comeback. Ochi deduces that Isumi made a fatal mistake in his match against Hikaru. Isumi is to battle Ochi, in which losing the match would give him no chance of passing the professional exam.: Game based on (Hikaru): Yasui Sanchi vs. Kono Mototora (1793); Game based on (Isumi): Hon'inbō Shūwa vs. Murase Yakichi (1856)
41	"Three Weeks isn't Enough!"; Transliteration: "Three Weeks isn't Enough!" (Japanese: 三週では遅い!)	24 July 2002	15 October 2007
Isumi manages to pull off a win against Ochi. On the seventeenth day, Hikaru has his third loss to Honda, who helps Ochi realize that Hikaru is getting stronger by the day. Ochi later asks Akira for help to defeat him.
42	"The First to Pass"; Transliteration: "The First One To Pass" (Japanese: 一人目の合格者)	31 July 2002	29 October 2007
As the pro exam nears its end, leading insei such as Tsubaki, Adachi, Komiya, and Katagiri realize they have no hope of defeating the forerunners (Hikaru, Ochi, Waya, Isumi, and Honda). Akira reveals to Ochi the first match played against Hikaru two years ago. After twenty-two days, Hikaru has three losses. As Ochi officially passes the exam with only one loss thus far, the pressure is now on Hikaru, Waya and Isumi, who are battling for the two remaining professional spots.
43	"Hikaru vs. Waya"; Transliteration: "Hikaru vs. Waya" (Japanese: ヒカルvs和谷)	7 August 2002	12 November 2007
On the twenty-sixth day, Hikaru and Waya are to face off with only one match remaining after they finish in the professional exam. If Waya wins this match, he will become a pro. Waya puts Hikaru in a difficult situation, in which the latter has a slim chance of winning the match.: Game based on: Cho Chikun vs. Hideo Otake (1980)
44	"Comeback from the Brink"; Transliteration: "Back to Life from Certain Death" (Japanese: 起死回生)	14 August 2002	26 November 2007
Hikaru is able to defeat Waya. Akira urges Ochi to win his match against Hikaru on following day. Hikaru soon finds out that Ochi has been studying under Akira in preparation for the upcoming match.
45	"Hikaru vs. Ochi"; Transliteration: "Hikaru vs. Ochi" (Japanese: ヒカルvs越智)	21 August 2002	10 December 2007
Hikaru faces off against Ochi, who has initiated a technique influenced by Akira. Hikaru later uses a similar tactic with his game against Suyong, but Ochi sees right through this and manages to block Hikaru off with a move. Meanwhile, Waya is battling against Fukui, in which the former must win to gain professional status.: Game based on (Hikaru): Ebisawa Kenzo vs. Hon'inbō Shūsaku (1859); Game based on (Waya): Hon'inbō Shūei vs. Yasui Sanei (1897); Game based on (Isumi): Sonoda Yasutaka vs. Tei Meiko (1993)
46	"The Final Day of the Pro Exam"; Transliteration: "The Final Day of the Pro Exam" (Japanese: プロ試験最終日)	28 August 2002	20 December 2007
Both Hikaru and Waya win their matches, thus Isumi is unable to advance to professional status. Akira hears news of this, anticipating his competitive ambitions for Hikaru. The Haze Go Club also receives word of Hikaru turning professional, as they wish he would visit them sometime soon.
47	"Into the World of the Pros"; Transliteration: "To the World of the Pros" (Japanese: プロの世界へ)	4 September 2002	7 January 2008
Hikaru, Waya, and Ochi are featured in a Go magazine as the newest professionals. There are matches to be made to evaluate how well they can do against the top professionals. Meanwhile, Toya Meijin wins the Oza title. When Hikaru gets placed up against Toya Meijin, he must decide whether or not to let Sai play.
48	"Sai vs. Meijin"; Transliteration: "Sai vs. Meijin" (Japanese: 佐為vs名人)	11 September 2002	22 January 2008
Hikaru is set to face Toya Meijin in his first match, but Sai wishes to play. Akira, Waya, Ochi, Ogata, and Kuwabara will be viewing this match. Hikaru decides to let Sai play, but only if he plays as though he had a fifteen point handicap in order to make his style unrecognizable and sloppy.: Game based on: Cho Chikun vs. Hideo Otake (1996)
49	"A Game of Desperate Measures"; Transliteration: "A Desperate Match" (Japanese: 捨て身の一局)	18 September 2002	4 February 2008
Toya senses a seasoned professional around Hikaru. Sai plays a complicated game with many traps, yet Toya avoids and alters Sai's strategy. After Hikaru resigns, Toya requests to play him again in the future without any handicap. Kuwabara actually suspects that Hikaru was playing as though he had a handicap against him instead of for him, which explained his overplays.
50	"Fujiwara-No-Sai"; Transliteration: "Fujiwara No Sai?" (Japanese: 藤原佐為?)	25 September 2002	18 February 2008
Sai finally reveals all of his past, up until his first encounter with Hikaru as well as his rivalry with Akira. During his journey to play the divine move, Sai wonders if he will ever get to play Go again as Hikaru is becoming stronger and letting him play less often.
51	"Kurata 6-Dan"; Transliteration: "Kurata 6-dan" (Japanese: 倉田六段)	2 October 2002	3 March 2008
Hikaru goes to a Go field event as the newest professional, as Sai catches a Go pro selling overpriced Go boards. Sai soon tells Hikaru to play a match against the pro to settle the score. Kurata, a man who brags of his professional status, makes an appearance, being intrigued of Hikaru.
52	"Hikaru vs. Akira"; Transliteration: "Hikaru vs. Akira" (Japanese: ヒカルvsアキラ)	9 October 2002	17 March 2008
During a Go award ceremony, Hikaru learns his first official professional match will be against Akira. Yet he seems to be overexcited of this moment in time, finally seeing how close he is to Akira. However, circumstances are about to change their fate with one another.
53	"The Acknowledgment of Sai"; Transliteration: "The Confession of Sai" (Japanese: sai の告白)	16 October 2002	31 March 2008
After learning of Toya Meijin's collapse from a heart attack, Hikaru visits Toya in the hospital. While there, Hikaru learns that Toya is now playing Internet Go. Hikaru arranges a match a week in advance for Sai to battle against Toya. They agree to high stakes: if Sai loses, then he will reveal his identity, while Toya agrees to retire from Go if he loses.
54	"The Excitement Mounts"; Transliteration: "Excited Heart" (Japanese: たかぶる心)	23 October 2002	14 April 2008
Those who play Internet Go observe that Toya is playing online. At first, people think he is an impostor. Ichiryu, the holder of the highest title in Japan, the Kisei, resents that someone might be impersonating Toya and challenges him to a game, but is defeated easily. A number of other top players, including the world amateur champion Li Rinshin, also realize it has to be the real thing because of his great strength. Little do go fans know that a match for the millennium between Sai and Toya is about to occur. Akari drops by and challenges Hikaru to a match, in which Sai complies with just a nine stone handicap as a means to calm his nerves.
55	"Sai vs. Koyo Toya"; Transliteration: "Sai vs. Toya Koyo" (Japanese: sai VS toya koyo)	30 October 2002	28 April 2008
Sai and Toya face each other in Internet Go, and huge numbers of go fans are watching this, amazed by the superb play on both sides. Waya and Akira also independently watch the game, realizing what a strong player Sai must be.: Game based on: Rin Kaiho vs. Norimoto Yoda (1997)
56	"After a Millennium Comes the Answer!"; Transliteration: "The Thousand Year Answer" (Japanese: 千年の答え)	6 November 2002	12 May 2008
After finding about the match, Ogata deduces that Toya must have already arranged this in person, as Toya requested the "no visitors" sign the day before. Both Akira and Ogata suspect that Hikaru has a connection to Sai. Toya looks to have the advantage, but Sai finds a great move to erase the enemy territory. Eventually, Toya works out that with best play, he would lose by half a point, and had no doubt that Sai would play the best moves. So Toya resigns, while most onlookers thought it was neck-and-neck. Sai finally realizes why he was brought back through Hikaru, finding his time on this world is about to end.
57	"Let Me Play Sai!"; Transliteration: "Let Me Play Sai!" (Japanese: saiと打たせろ)	13 November 2002	26 May 2008
Hikaru visits Toya at the hospital again, hoping that he would not retire as a professional Go player. Toya clarifies that he would retire but not stop play altogether. Ogata overhears their conversation and interrogates Hikaru if he knew Sai's identity. Akira also appears, wondering the same thing. Toya manages to keep his arrangement a secret from both Akira and Ogata. Hikaru is unaware that Sai will soon no longer exist, who has fulfilled his purpose to pave the way toward the divine move.
58	"One-Color Go"; Transliteration: "One-Color Go" (Japanese: 一色碁)	20 November 2002	9 June 2008
Hikaru and Sai get word that Toya lost the Judan title to Ogata. Kurata encounters Hikaru and soon decides to play him with an autograph on the line. When the two go to a Go salon, the blacks stones are unavailable. Hikaru must learn how to play One Color Go. Although Kurata lost count of the moves due to over thinking, he made a right move by luck and Hikaru resigns. Though Hikaru resigns from the match, Kurata gives him half his autograph as a gift as he recognizes Hikaru's strength.: Game based on: Su Kaiseki vs. Satoru Kobayashi (1984)
59	"Koyo Toya Retires!"; Transliteration: "Toya Koyo Retires!" (Japanese: 塔矢行洋引退)	27 November 2002	23 June 2008
Toya keeps his promise to Sai and announces his retirement, causing an uproar from fans and followers. Kurata stops by and plays a game with Toya, who says that retirement would be advantageous in his personal life. Hikaru has his first match in the professional series, easily defeating his opponent. After learning that Heihachi's shed had been raided, Sai tells Hikaru to find the Go board. Hikaru is surprised to see that Sai's bloodstains on the Go board are starting to disappear.: Game based on: Wu Songsheng vs. Yu Ch'ang-hyeok (1993)
60	"Farewell Hikaru"; Transliteration: "Farewell Hikaru" (Japanese: さよならヒカル)	4 December 2002	7 July 2008
Hikaru goes to a Go seminar, only to meet Ogata in a drunken stupor. Hikaru allows Sai to play Ogata, and Hikaru seems to get better at analyzing his game play. As Hikaru and Sai return home and play one last game, Sai finally vanishes.: Game based on: Satoru Kobayashi vs. Cho Chikun (1998)
61	"Is Sai Really Gone?"; Transliteration: "Sai is Gone?" (Japanese: 佐為が消えた?)	11 December 2002	21 July 2008
Hikaru refuses to accept the truth about Sai and begins a quest to find him. Hikaru notices that Sai's bloodstains on the Go board in the shed have totally disappeared. He travels to Innoshima, visiting a shrine, a museum, and a cemetery all connected to Shusaku. Even then Hikaru is unable to find Sai.
62	"Hiroshima's Top Player"; Transliteration: "The Strongest Player in Hiroshima" (Japanese: 広島最強棋士)	18 December 2002	4 August 2008
Hikaru discovers an arrogant player, said to be the best amateur in Japan. The amateur challenges Hikaru, even knowing he is a professional, because he thinks Hikaru is weak due to the overplays made against Toya in the past. Hikaru is told that there is another memorial of Shusaku in Tokyo, which gives him the motivation to win his match against the amateur with great speed. Hikaru fails to find Sai even after returning to Tokyo.
63	"I'm Never Gonna Play Again!"; Transliteration: "I Won't Play Anymore" (Japanese: もう打たない)	25 December 2002	18 August 2008
Hikaru finds old game records of Shusaku, and sees the great genius of Sai playing through him, seeing the famous ear-reddening move, and regrets not having let Sai play all the time. Hikaru decides to not play Go anymore in hopes that Sai will return and play in his place. Akira searches for Hikaru to convince him otherwise.
64	"Keicho Flower Bowls"; Transliteration: "Keichou Flowerpots" (Japanese: 慶長の花器)	8 January 2003	29 August 2008
In this side story, Hikaru hits a baseball which consequently damages Kaga's favorite teacup. Hikaru and Sai enter a store where a shopkeeper is conning a customer into buying a fake flower bowl. Later on, a child spots her grandfather's stolen genuine keicho flower bowl, however the shopkeeper refuses to give it to her for free. Hikaru challenges the shopkeeper to a Go match to win back the flower bowl. It is revealed that flowers appear in the keicho flower bowl when it is filled with water.
65	"Isumi no Go"; Transliteration: "Isumi no Go" (Japanese: 伊角の碁)	15 January 2003	15 September 2008
Isumi decides to play Go in China in hopes of learning how not to choke in big matches. Waya tries to get Hikaru to play Go again, but to no avail. After he loses to a couple of kids, Isumi is taken under the wing of a strong player in a Chinese Go institute. There he trains for a few days to become a better player, though he takes pity on himself for seeing how well this institute is up to par with that of professionals.: Game based on: Ma Xiaochun vs. Cao Dayuan (1993)
66	"Fateful Encounter"; Transliteration: "The Fated Encounter" (Japanese: 運命の出会い)	22 January 2003	29 September 2008
In this episode, this dates to Akira Toya prior to meeting Hikaru. He is recommended to turn professional by his peers. A young champion finds Akira at a Go salon, challenging him to a match. After Akira wins, he is convinced to embark on a journey to turn professional, meeting Hikaru along his path.
67	"Isumi's Test"; Transliteration: "Isumi Tested" (Japanese: 試される伊角)	29 January 2003	13 October 2008
Isumi learns new strategies are needed to be successful in the Go world, including controlling his emotions. A friendly player trains him for a match with another player who is slacking. After Isumi wins the game, he regains his confidence in striving to be a professional.
68	"Losing by Default"; Transliteration: "Losing by Default" (Japanese: 不戦敗)	5 February 2003	27 October 2008
Hikaru has kept his commitment not to play matches, causing his friends to abandon him. As the forfeits continue to grow, so too does Hikaru's chance of losing his professional status.
69	"A Determined Visitor"; Transliteration: "The Determined Visitor" (Japanese: 決意の訪問者)	12 February 2003	10 November 2008
Isumi returns to Japan and learns that Hikaru has been losing by default in many of his matches. Isumi goes to Hikaru's house and demands that Hikaru play him, to make up for the game Isumi forfeited during the pro exam.
70	"Sai was Here"; Transliteration: "Sai was Here..." (Japanese: 佐為がいた...)	19 February 2003	24 November 2008
Hikaru starts a match with Isumi, feeling guilty for breaking his personal promise. During this intense battle, Hikaru realizes that Sai is still in his Go. Meanwhile, Akira has won the game that would qualify him for the Honinbo title match series.
71	"Making a Comeback"; Transliteration: "The First Match After Coming Back" (Japanese: 復帰初戦)	26 February 2003	8 December 2008
Hikaru is excited to play Go again in the professional rounds, which takes everyone by surprise. His sudden comeback is discussed by many people, all giving him their support.
72	"The Race is On"; Transliteration: "The Two Who Began To Run" (Japanese: 走りだした二人)	5 March 2003	22 December 2008
Hikaru and Akira begin conquering the world of Go each on their own, but they still desire to see which of them is truly better. These two are recognized as the new wave of players capable of finding the divine move. As part of this wave, Ogata also takes the Gosei title.: Game based on: Masaki Takemiya vs. Rin Kaiho (1977)
73	"Shindo vs. Toya"; Transliteration: "Shindo vs. Toya" (Japanese: 進藤対塔矢)	12 March 2003	n/a
Hikaru prepares for his big match with Akira. The professionals watch as the two youngest players face each other to see which one is truly the best and to see how far each of them have grown.: Game based on: Kunihisa Honda vs. Nakano Hironari (1999)
74	"The Power Within"; Transliteration: "Inside You" (Japanese: キミの中にいる)	19 March 2003	n/a
Hikaru vows that as long as he plays Go, Sai will always remain in his heart. Others have seen this fast-paced match progressing with intensity and determination. During the course of the match, Akira realizes that Sai is in Hikaru's heart.
75	"A Nostalgic Smile"; Transliteration: "That Same Old Smile" (Japanese: なつかしい笑顔)	26 March 2003	n/a
Sai appears to Hikaru in a dream, giving the latter his fan symbolically as a reminder of his presence within him. Though he will be in the starting point of his professional status, he strives to one day become one of the top Go professional players and find the divine move.

== New Year Special – The Road to the Hokuto Cup ==
- Japanese Broadcast: 2004-01-03
- Running time: 77 minutes
- Ending Theme:

"Everlasting Snow" by Dream

Hikaru is given a phone call asking him to appear in a Japan/China/Korea under-18 tournament – the Hokuto Cup – but he finds out he will have to take part in a preliminary tournament to choose Japan's three contestants. Upon discussing this with Akira, he discovers that Akira has already been chosen for the tournament and will not be taking place in the preliminaries. Hikaru then decides not to visit Akira's Go Salon until he takes his place on the team with Akira. That may be tougher than originally planned, as not only does Hikaru have to battle with old friends for one of two coveted spots, but he may have a new challenger, in an unorthodox player from the Kansai Go Institute named Yashiro. The anime also shows Akira Toya play Ogata and Hikaru play Morishita 9-dan; both young players lose to the seasoned top pros.

This special does not cover the actual tournament. The manga, however, does and offers some closure.

- Game based on (Kadowaki): Imamura Toshiya vs. Naoto Hikosaka (1999)
- Game based on (Morishita): Cho Chikun vs. Lee Chang-ho (1993)
- Game based on (Ogata): Sakakibara Shoji vs. Sonoda Yuichi (1992)
- Game based on (Yashiro): Shinji Takao vs. Keigo Yamashita (2000)

== Music ==
Opening Themes
#	Transcription/Translation	Performed by	Episodes
1	Get Over	dream	1–30
2	I'll be the One	HΛL	31–60
3	Fantasy	Nana Katase	61–75

Ending themes
#	Transcription/Translation	Performed by	Episodes
1	Bokura no Bouken (ボクらの冒険; lit. 'Our Adventure')	Kids Alive	1–12
2	Hitomi no Chikara (ヒトミノチカラ; lit. 'Power of the Eyes')	Arisa Mizuki	13–30
3	Sincerely: Ever Dream	dream	31–46
4	Days	shela	47–63
5	Music is my Thing	dream	64–74
6	Get Over (Special Mix) first part – of vocal version of Sincerely (piano version mainly, final fragments are multi-instrumental); second part – Get Over	dream	75
