= Chiyotaro Onoda =

Japanese Go player

Personal information
- Native name: 小野田 千代太郎 (Japanese)
- Full name: Chiyotarō Onoda
- Born: March 18, 1896 Japan
- Died: January 11, 1944 (aged 47)

Sport
- Teacher: Unknown
- Rank: 7 dan
- Affiliation: Nihon Ki-in, Kiseisha

Chiyotaro Onoda (小野田 千代太郎, Onoda Chiyotarō; March 18, 1896 – January 11, 1944) was a professional 7 dan Go player.

== Biography ==
Onoda was a member of the Hoensha teaching group established by Honinbo Shuho, which ran from 1879 until the founding of the Nihon Ki-in. In addition, he was one of five players to form the Hiseikai, a group tournament consisting also of Dohei Takabe, Kensaku Segoe, Tamejiro Suzuki and Karigane Junichi.

Although he joined the Nihon Ki-in when it was established in 1924, Onoda broke away to help form the Kiseisha. However, he soon became disillusioned and, along with Suzuki and Kato Shin, returned to the Nihon Ki-in in 1928.

Onoda was promoted to 7 dan after defeating Minoru Kitani, also a 7 dan at the time, in May 1939.
