= Hon'inbō Shūsai =

Japanese Go player (1874–1940)

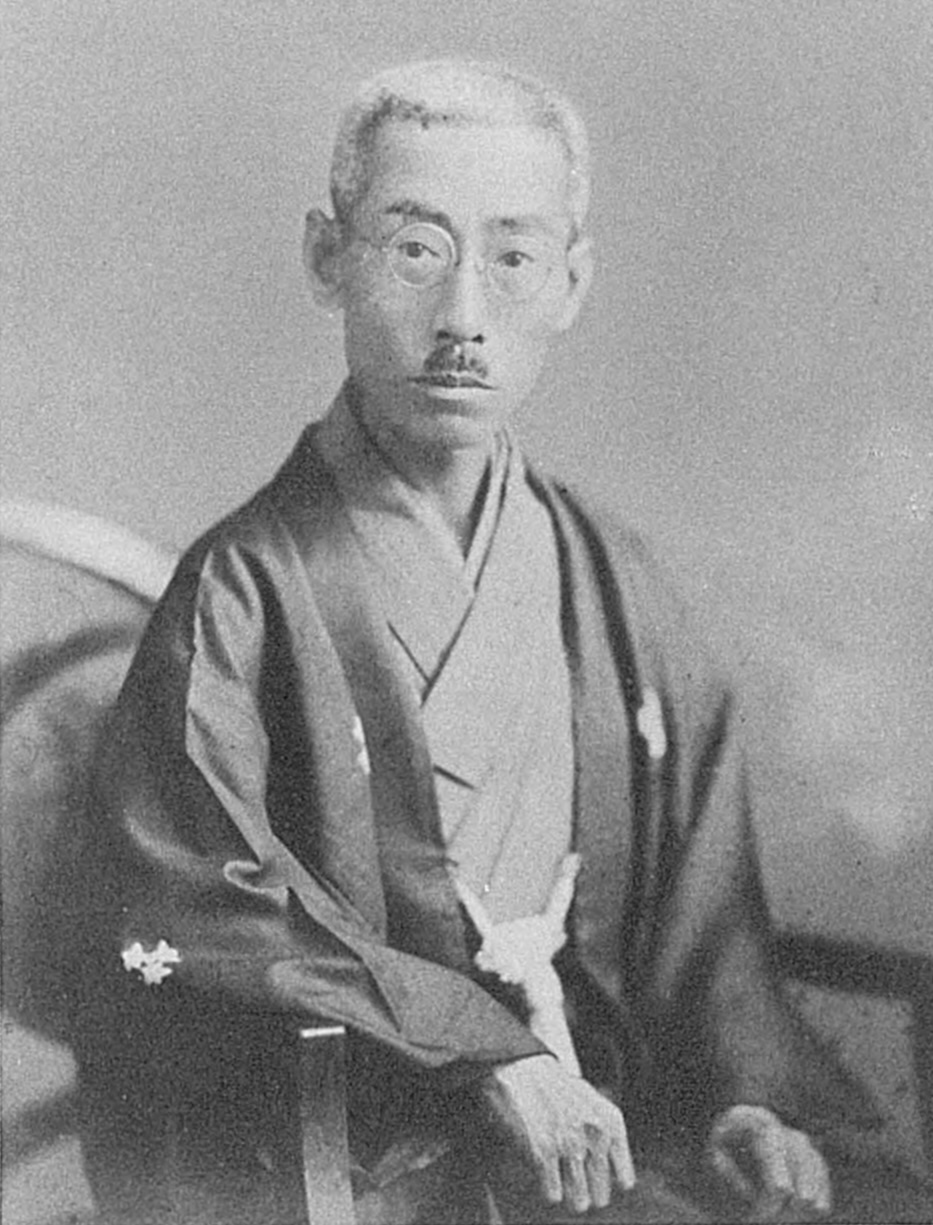

Personal information
- Native name: 本因坊秀哉 (Japanese)
- Full name: Hoju Tamura
- Born: June 24, 1874 Shiba, Japan
- Died: January 18, 1940 (aged 65) Atami, Japan

Sport
- Rank: 9 dan

Hon'inbō Shūsai (本因坊 秀哉, Hon'inbō Shūsai; June 24, 1874 – January 18, 1940) is the professional name of Hoju Tamura, also known as Yasuhisa Tamura (田村保寿, Tamura Yasuhisa), who was a Japanese professional Go player.

== Biography ==
Shusai was born in Shiba, Tokyo, son of Tamura Yasunaga, a retainer of the shōgun. He learned go at age 10 and joined the Hoensha in 1883, then under the leadership of Murase Shūho. He was made shodan at age 13. At age 18, he attained the rank of 2nd dan (the lower professional ranks cannot be assumed to correspond to modern ones). He then broke with the game for a time, tried to go into business on his own account, and ended up in a Buddhist retreat in Chiba Prefecture. After more than a year out of the game, he set up his own go salon in Roppongi.

He was then helped by Kim Ok-gyun, a Korean then resident in Japan, who used his contacts to secure Tamura an introduction to Hon'inbō Shūei. He was re-ranked as 4th dan in 1892 and proceeded up the ranks from there. He engaged in a number of high-profile matches. He played Ishii Senji, a top player at Hoensha, in two jubango, one in 1895 on sen, and the other in 1897 on sen-ai-sen. A fourth such match in 1899 was left incomplete. In 1897, he challenged Yasui San'ei, last of the Yasui house, to a jubango. He also challenged Hon'inbō Shūgen. In 1897–98 he played Ishii Senji once more. In 1899 he played jubango against Karigane Junichi, who would be his only serious rival over the coming decades. In 1900–01 he played a jubango with Iwasa Kei. He emerged with the reputation of the top player, apart from Shuei. In 1907, he became 7th dan, an exclusive grade in those times.

He became the 21st and last hereditary head of the Hon'inbō house, as successor to Shūei. The manner of his ascension was to cause a lasting conflict between Tamura, who took the name Shūsai, and Karigane, also of the Honinbo house, who had been backed by Shuei's widow.

He attained the title of Meijin in 1914, becoming the tenth player since the original Hon'inbō Sansa to do so. In Shūsai's case, as was for Shūei previously, there was no official government involvement, and his title was given by the acclaim of fellow players. He subsequently played in some high-profile "defenses" of the Meijin position as the only 9th dan player.

== Style and influence ==
Shūsai was a naturally slow and deep-thinking player. The fashion for relatively slow play in Japan has been traced back to his influence. Innovations such as time limits and clocks were introduced during his lifetime, much to the ire of Shūsai.

Shusai pushed the strategy of the Meiji period – as famously outlined by Hon'inbō Shūho's book Hoen Shinpo – to further efficiency. This was done by playing farther and sometimes higher extensions, with the intention of providing better global protection to weak points. This method – then new – has been referred to as "harmony breaking".

Be that as it may, his opening style was unable to deeply influence many others as the culmination of his style was soon cut short by the arrival of the shinfuseki openings revolution. He rarely innovated in joseki, preferring the admonition "do not seek out novelty".

Before the Nihon Ki-in was set up, there was no codified set of rules available at all. Shūsai handed down judgements on controversies in the first days, for example on mannenko.

== Under the Nihon Ki-in ==
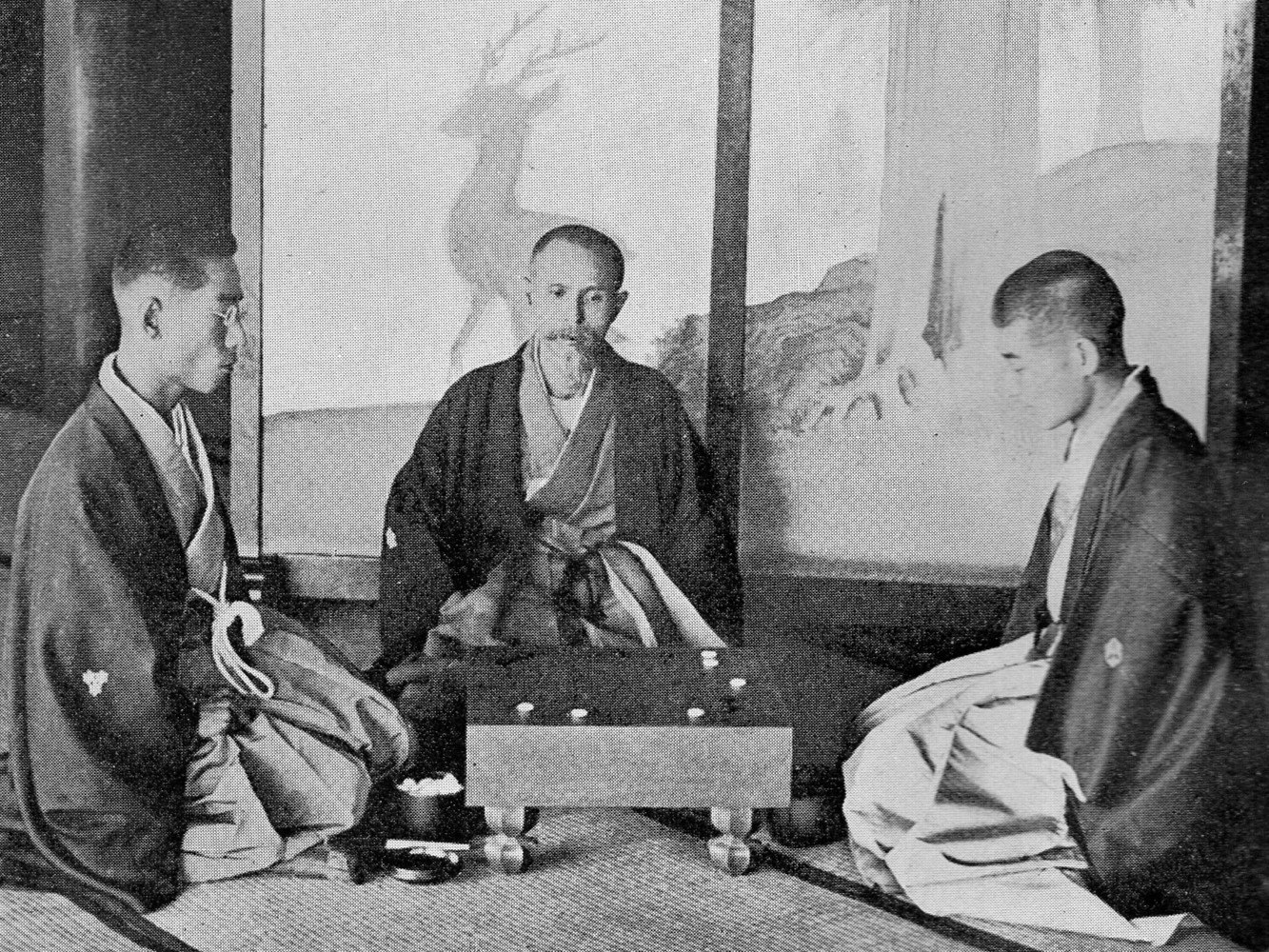
Honinbo Shusai, Honinbo Shuei, Karigane Junichi

The 1924 foundation of the Nihon Ki-in was the most significant moment in the organisational history of Japanese go in the twentieth century. It was mediated through Shusai, whose prestige was required as a minimum condition to unify the various groups. Shusai was backed by Baron Kishichiro Okura, an influential business magnate.

The process was started in 1923 with the foundation of the Hiseikai group by Karigane, Tamejiro Suzuki, Dohei Takabe, and Segoe Kensaku. This prompted the amalgamation of the Honinbo school and the Hoensha, in January 1923, in the Chūō Kiin. This arrangement was however temporary, and the two constituent organizations split three months later. The 1923 Great Kantō earthquake brought hardship to a number of Go organizations, and many of them faced closure. Under the guidance of Baron Kishichiro Okura, the Nihon Ki-in was founded in May 1924 to merge existing organizations into a single entity. Shusai was an important member of this new organization.

== Important matches ==
=== The match with Kiseisha ===
Karigane, in the meantime, had set up his rival Kiseisha organisation (1924). The Yomiuri Shimbun planned a challenge match between the two camps. This was the setting for the 1926 showdown with Karigane (the "group-capturing masterpiece"), perhaps the most anthologised game of modern times. Edward Lasker in his book Go and Go Moku wrote:

... probably one of the most beautiful games on record ... [after White's 41st move] The way Karigane boldly develops a position and finally cuts at e4 is most ingenious; it took a Hon'inbō to refute his plan. ... [After the end] Playing over this beautiful game over several times will teach the student more than he could learn in several years practice. No better guide on the way to mastership can be imagined.

Intense public interest was shown by, or perhaps aroused by, the Yomiuri's publicity tactic of posting the game on billboards, with plays pasted on as they happened. Shūsai won the game with White. The players had 16 hours each; the game was played out over 6 sessions, with Karigane eventually resigning as he ran out of time in a game he was likely to lose by about 5 points.

This was just the initial game of a subsequent win-and-continue match, in which three Kiseisha players (Karigane, Takabe and Onoda Chiyotaro) rotated against Nihon Ki-in young stars. Kitani Minoru won ten games in a row, and the match was a triumph for the Ki-in.

=== 1933 game with Go Seigen ===
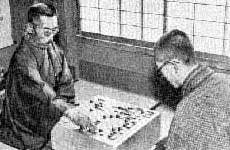
Hon'inbō Shūsai (left), last head of house Hon'inbō, plays against then-up-and-coming Go Seigen in the game of the century

In 1933, Go Seigen and Shūsai played a famous game. Go Seigen was then 18 years old, ranked 5 dan, and had been in Japan about five years. They had played before, but not an even game; Go Seigen had won five previous handicap games.

The tradition at the time dictated whoever played White had the right to adjourn the game at any time, and there was no sealing of moves. This meant that Shūsai, being the nominally stronger player and thus holding White, could adjourn the game whenever it was his turn to play and continue deliberating at his leisure during the adjournment. Shūsai shamelessly abused this privilege by calling adjournments some 13 times, without exception, all at his turn to move, thus prolonging the match to a period of three months (16 October 1933 – 19 January 1934). For instance, Shūsai played first on the eighth day of the match, and Go Seigen replied within two minutes. Shūsai then thought for three and a half hours but only to adjourn the game. It was no secret that Shusai, during adjournments, discussed and studied the game with his students to come up with the best moves. Go Seigen was therefore put into an especially adverse position for having to take on the entire Honinbo establishment.

Shūsai trailed throughout the game until, on the 13th day of the match, he made a brilliant move at W160, now celebrated. It was rumored that it was not Shūsai but one of his students, Maeda Nobuaki, who was the author of this ingenious move. Segoe Kensaku told a reporter this, in what he thought was an off-the-record interview. Maeda himself even hinted as much. When presented with the opportunities to debunk these rumors, Maeda neither denied nor confirmed them. The match ended with Hon'inbō Shūsai winning by two points.

Go board, 19 by 19. Black stones: E19, P19, B18, C18, D18, E18, P18, B17, F17, K17, R17, G16, H16, O16, R16, G15, L15, M15, N15, O15, P15, F14, H14, K14, O14, S14, H13, P13, Q13, R13, D10, E10, F10, G10, K10, Q10, A9, C9, E9, L9, Q9, C8, E8, M8, O8, Q8, R8, D7, G7, O7, P7, R7, F6, O6, S6, F5, L5, M5, N5, S5, C4, D4, E4, F4, G4, H4, J4, K4, N4, R4, E3, H3, L3, S3, F2, R2, S2. White stones: F18, G18, N18, O18, C17, E17, H17, J17, L17, B16, C16, D16, E16, J16, L16, Q16, H15, J15, K15, Q15, N14, P14, N13, O13, B12, C12, G12, P12, Q12, S12, A11, D11, E11, H11, Q11, B10, C10, O10, R10, R9, H8, S8, C7, E7, F7, M7, Q7, S7, C6, E6, N6, P6, Q6, R6, C5, E5, O5, B4, L4, M4, P4, C3, D3, F3, G3, J3, K3, M3, N3, O3, Q3, R3, D2, E2, G2, H2, Q2. Marks: triangle on white stone at H8.△
Go Seigen v. Hon'inbō Shūsai (white), W160=$\triangle$

=== Retirement game ===
Shusai transferred the Hon'inbō title to the Nihon Ki-in in 1936 and retired thereafter.

In 1938, at the age of 64, he came back to play a memorial "retirement game" against Kitani Minoru, losing it by 5 points. The game was later immortalized by Nobel Prize winner Kawabata Yasunari in the novel Meijin (published in English as The Master of Go).

Kitani Minoru, having witnessed how Shūsai abused his adjournment privilege during his match against Go Seigen, demanded that the moves be sealed before each adjournment. Initially, Shūsai's camp opposed this, but Kitani insisted, and Shūsai eventually gave in. Time limits were used, of 40 hours each, and Kitani thought deeply. He won the game by a comfortable margin of five points (the game had no komi, so Kitani as black kept his initial advantage by safe play).

== Controversy ==
Hon'inbō Shusai has had a number of accusations leveled against his character. These deal with his rivalries, within the Hon'inbō house and subsequently with the establishment of the Nihon Ki-in, conduct as a player, and financial dealings. Even though a transitional figure, Shūsai possessed enormous prestige due to his positions of Meijin and Hon'inbō, but he often abused his privileges as the senior player.

Hashimoto Utaro confided to a reporter that his master Segoe Kensaku had his reservations about Shūsai. Segoe had earlier, along with Shūsai, visited China at the invitation of several wealthy Chinese go patrons. They played a number of exhibition games against Chinese players. As a guest, Shūsai had refused to abide by Chinese playing rules, embarrassing his hosts in the process. Moreover, Shūsai would not apparently risk losing to young Chinese players and left many games unfinished, supposedly to be concluded another day, a promise he never fulfilled. Segoe commented to Hashimoto that it was unacceptable for Shūsai to have left the games unfinished after receiving hospitality and large game fees.

Go Seigen also held Shūsai in very low esteem. According to Pieter Mioch, who interviewed Go Seigen for the Dutch Go Association magazine, Go Seigen called Shūsai a "scoundrel" and a "villain". Go Seigen accused Shūsai of selling his prestigious Hon'inbō title for a large sum to build himself a magnificent house while failing to give any of the money back to the go community.

== See also ==
- Japanese Go professionals

Preceded by Hon'inbō Shūei	Meijin; 1914–1940	Succeeded by none
Preceded by Hon'inbō Shūgen	Hon'inbō; 1908–1940	Succeeded by Title transferred to a titleholder system
