= Karigane Junichi =

Japanese Go player

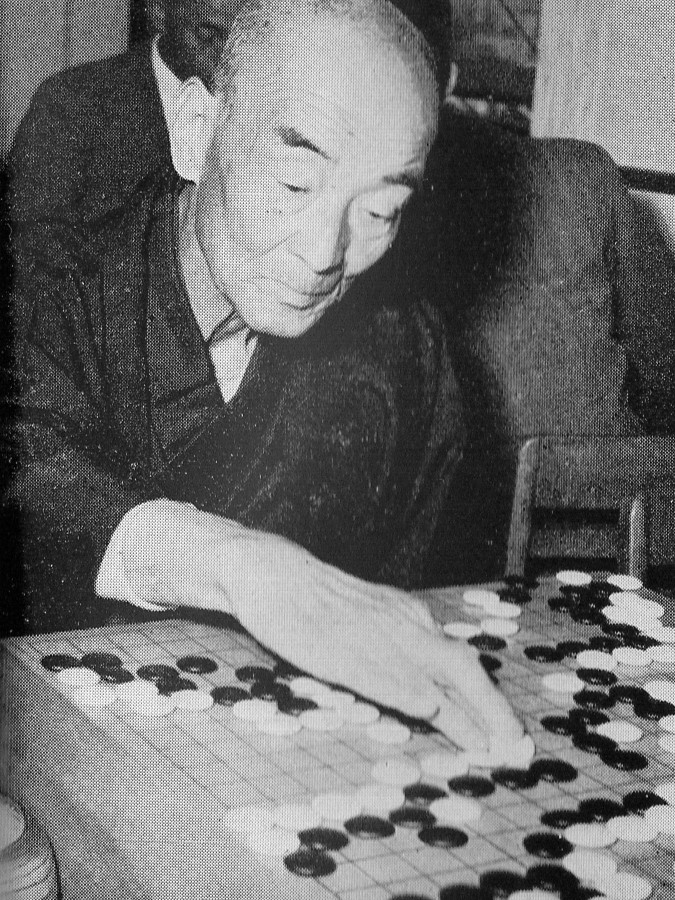

Personal information
- Native name: 雁金 準一 (Japanese)
- Full name: Karigane Jun'ichi
- Born: July 30, 1879 Japan
- Died: February 21, 1959 (aged 79)

Sport
- Teacher: Unknown
- Rank: 9 dan
- Affiliation: Kiseisha, Keiinsha

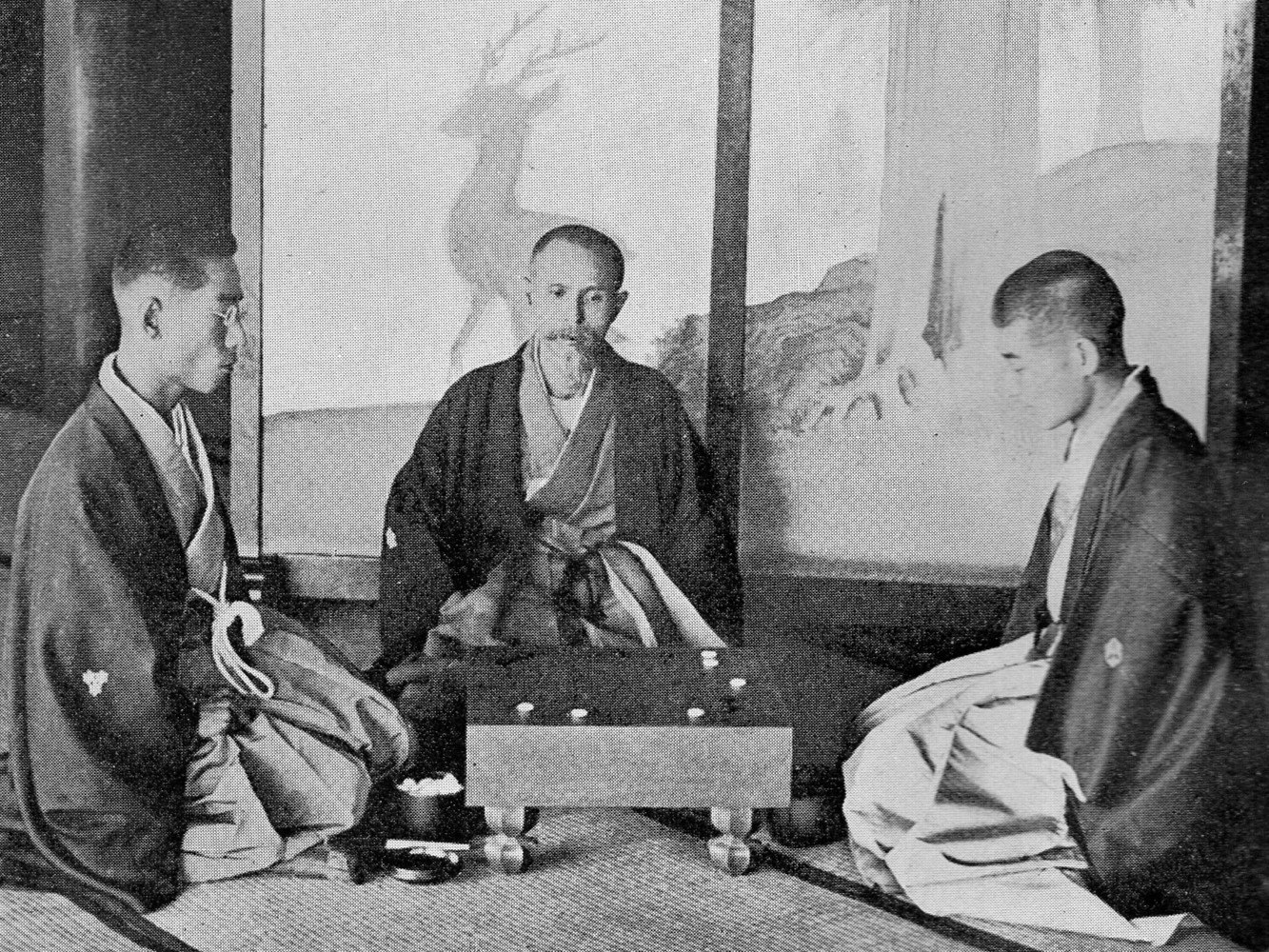
Honinbo Shusai, Honinbo Shuei, Karigane Junichi

Karigane Jun'ichi (雁金 準一; July 30, 1879 – February 21, 1959) was a Japanese professional Go player, posthumously made an honorary 9 dan by the Nihon Ki-in.

== Biography ==
Karigane was responsible for founding several organizations that would continue to be influential throughout the early 1900s. In 1922, he formed the Hiseikai, a group tournament, which also included Chiyotaro Onoda, Segoe Kensaku, Tamejiro Suzuki and Dohei Takabe. Karigane won the first tournament, which was notable for being played without handicaps and with a time limit.

== The Kiseisha ==
Karigane joined the Nihon Ki-in when it was founded in 1926, but shortly afterwards broke away to form the Kiseisha splinter group. Rivalry would persist between the two groups until 1991, when the Keiinsha, the eventual offshoot of the Kiseisha, was finally dissolved with the death of its last member. During the first quarter of the twentieth century, Karigane was one of the two strongest Japanese players, and his major opponent was Honinbo Shusai of the Nihon Ki-in. The two rivals, each backed by distinct organisations, finally agreed to play one another in what would become a famous and much anthologised game, lasting sixteen hours.

=== The Famous Killing Game of 1926 ===
Karigane, who was a 7 dan at the time, played as black. Shusai, the only 9 dan at the time, took white and won on time. The marked stone, representing move 211, was played shortly before Karigane conceded. Edward Lasker in his book Go and Go Moku wrote:

... probably one of the most beautiful games on record ... [after White's 41st move] The way Karigane boldly develops a position and finally cuts at e4 is most ingenious; it took a Honinbo to refute his plan. ... [After the end] Playing over this beautiful game over several times will teach the student more than he could learn in several years practice. No better guide on the way to mastership can be imagined.

[[File:Go w

.svg|20x20px|link=|alt=]]

[[File:Go b

.svg|20x20px|link=|alt=]]

[[File:Go b

.svg|20x20px|link=|alt=]]

Karigane (b) vs. Shusai (w). W+ time.

This game was also replayed in Hikaru no Go Season 1, Episode 4, up to a point, where Hikaru Shindo failed to heed Fujiwara no Sai's advice and deviated from Karigane's play and lost the group much earlier to arrogant Shogi captain Kaga. But then Fujiwara managed to keep the loss down to a mere 1/2 point after komi.

== The Keiinsha ==
Karigane was promoted to 8 dan in 1933, and founded the Keiinsha as a replacement for the Kiseisha in 1941. Later that year, he played against Go Seigen, one of the strongest emerging Go players, as part of a jubango, a series of ten games during which players alternate colours, though when losing the opponent is typically forced to take black. Of these matches, only five were played, Seigen having won four, before the jubango was cancelled to avoid further embarrassment for Karigane.

== Death ==
On 1 January 1959, the Keiinsha promoted Karigane to 9 dan. He died shortly after, on 21 February.
