= Go Seigen =

Chinese-Japanese Go player

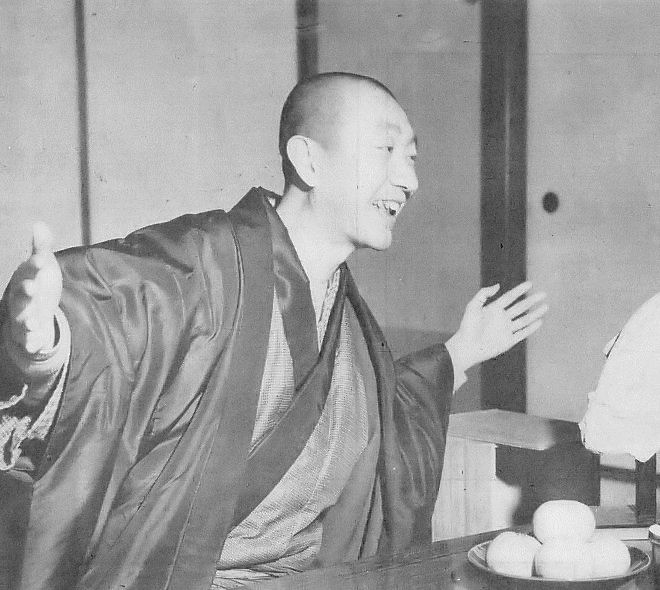
- Go Seigen in 1952

Personal information
- Native name: Wú Qīngyuán (Pinyin)
- Full name: Go Seigen
- Born: June 12, 1914 Minhou County, Fujian, Republic of China (Note: Fuzhou.)
- Died: November 30, 2014 (aged 100) Odawara, Kanagawa Prefecture, Japan

Sport
- Turned pro: 1929 (given 3 dan)
- Retired: 1983
- Teacher: Segoe Kensaku (from 1928)
- Pupil: Rin Kaiho
- Rank: 9 dan
- Affiliation: Nihon Ki-in

Go Seigen

Chinese name
- Traditional Chinese: 吳清源
- Simplified Chinese: 吴清源
Transcriptions
Standard Mandarin
- Hanyu Pinyin: Wú Qīngyuán
- Wade–Giles: Wu Ch'ing-yüan
Southern Min
- Hokkien POJ: Ngô͘ Chheng-goân
Eastern Min
- Fuzhou BUC: Ngù Chĭng-nguòng

Japanese name
- Kanji: 呉 清源
- Kana: ご せいげん
Transcriptions
- Romanization: Go Seigen

Wu Quan

Chinese name
- Traditional Chinese: 吳泉
- Simplified Chinese: 吴泉
Transcriptions
Standard Mandarin
- Hanyu Pinyin: Wú Quán
- Wade–Giles: Wu Ch'üan
Southern Min
- Hokkien POJ: Ngô͘ Choân
Eastern Min
- Fuzhou BUC: Ngù Ciòng

Japanese name
- Kanji: 呉 泉
- Kana: ご せん/くれ いずみ
Transcriptions
- Romanization: Go Sen/Kure Izumi

Wu Chuan (Chinese: 吳泉), courtesy name Wu qing-yuan (Chinese: 吳清源) (Note: His courtesy name was created based on his real name (Chuan means "spring, fountain" and Ching-yuan means "clear and pure source of water").) (June 12, 1914 – November 30, 2014), better known by the Japanese pronunciation of his courtesy name, Go Seigen (ご せいげん), was a Chinese-Japanese master of the game of Go. He is considered by many players to have been the greatest Go player in the 20th century.

== Biography ==
Born on June 12, 1914, in Minhou County, Fujian Province, southeast China, Go Seigen did not start learning Go until he was nine, a relatively late age for a professional (Honinbo Dosaku first learned go at seven and Honinbo Shusaku before he was six). His father, who had taken go lessons from Honinbo Shuho while studying in Japan, was responsible for introducing him to the game. Go Seigen quickly excelled and soon became known as a Go (Note: After days and nights, the shape of his left index finger changed, bending backwards. At that time, probably no other Chinese player was studying Japanese game records as deeply as he.) prodigy. By the time he was 12, less than three years after first learning the game, he was already of professional strength, as evidenced by his games against the visiting Japanese player Iwamoto Kaoru, 6p in 1926.

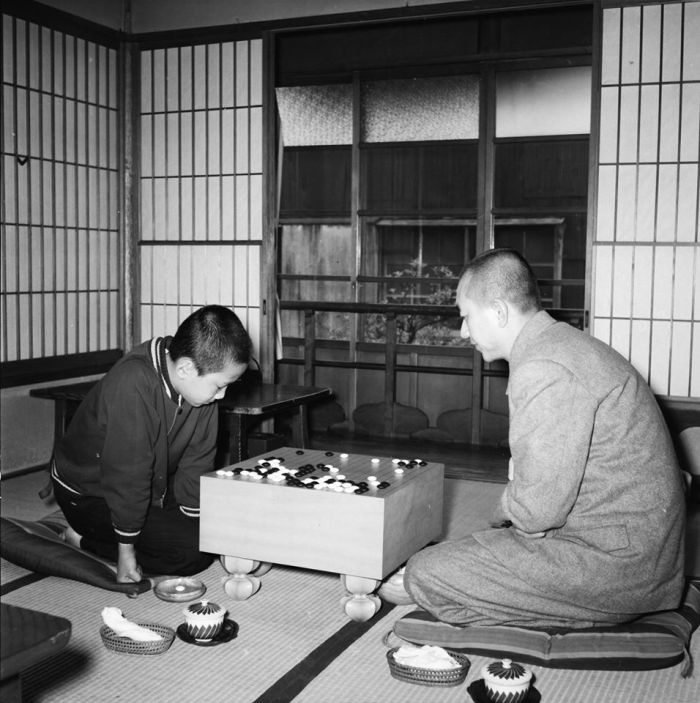
Go Seigen teaching his pupil Rin Kaiho

The next year, he was able to reach a draw in a two-game match against another Japanese professional, Inoue Kohei, 5p. In 1928, still only 14 years old, he twice defeated Hashimoto Utaro, 4p. Go Seigen's reputation spread to Japan, then the leading Go powerhouse, and a movement was started there to bring him to Japan. He subsequently emigrated to Japan in 1928, at the invitation of Baron Kihachiro Okura and Inukai Tsuyoshi (later prime minister of Japan), and embarked on a professional career. He was tutored by Segoe Kensaku, the same teacher as Hashimoto Utaro and Cho Hunhyun.

Go Seigen began his rise to the top of the professional go world early. By the time he was 18 he was already a top-flight player belonging to a very small elite. In 1933, along with his great friend Kitani Minoru, Go Seigen developed and popularized the Shinfuseki that broke away from the traditional opening patterns. It is for this very important contribution that Go Seigen and Kitani are recognized as the fathers of modern Go.

Starting in 1939, Go Seigen began a spectacular series of Jubango matches against other top players of the day. It was through these matches that Go Seigen convincingly demonstrated an overwhelming dominance over his contemporaries. Go Seigen had only two formal disciples—Rin Kaiho, Honorary Tengen and Rui Naiwei, who was the strongest female go player ever and won open Guksu title.

In the 1940s, Go Seigen became involved in the Jiu (璽宇) shinshūkyō, which sprouted out of Oomoto. After the Jikoson incident in 1947, he and his wife distanced themselves from the cult. In November 1948, both had formally left.

=== Retirement and death ===
In the summer of 1961, Go Seigen was struck by a motorcycle and was hospitalized for two months, and again for a longer period a year later. He suffered nerve damage, and his stamina and concentration greatly deteriorated as a result. The accident marked the beginning of the end for Go Seigen's career, as he was unable to play effectively in grueling long matches due to nausea and dizziness. He gradually played less and less often, and went into virtual retirement in 1964, although he did not "officially" retire until 1983.

After his retirement, Go Seigen remained active in the Go community by teaching, writing, and promoting the game around the world. He authored a number of books on go, some of which include A Way of Play for the 21st Century, Modern Joseki Application Dictionary, and Fuseki and Middle-game Attack and Defense. Go Seigen held study sessions with other professional players such as O Rissei, Michael Redmond, Rui Naiwei, and others.

In 1987, Go Seigen was awarded the Grand Cordon of the Order of the Rising Sun, 3rd Class, Gold Rays with Neck Ribbon, for his lifetime contributions to Go.

In 1999 Mr. Teramoto, Go Seigen's manager, told go writer Pieter Mioch "He [Go Seigen] is one of three Go players who will still be notable several hundred years from now. The other two are Dosaku (1645 – 1702) and Shusaku (1829 – 1862)."

In the early morning of 30 November 2014, Go Seigen died of natural causes at a hospital in Odawara, Kanagawa Prefecture, Japan, at the age of 100.

According to his wishes, he was buried at his hometown Fuzhou, China.

== Professional record ==
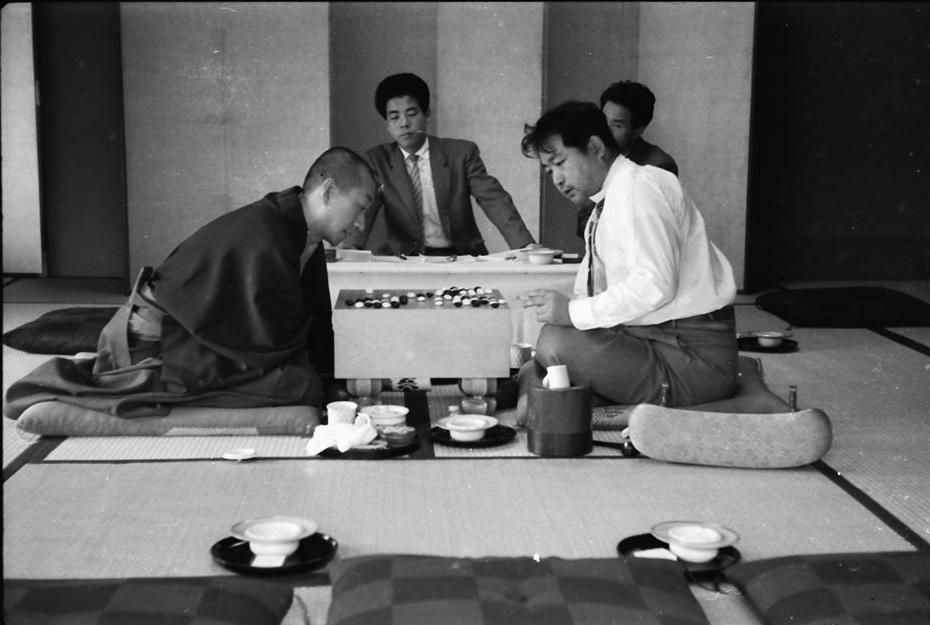
Jubango match against Fujisawa Kuranosuke (Fujisawa Hosai)

Go Seigen is commonly considered to be among the best to have ever played go, and is frequently deemed to have been the best player of the 20th century. He dominated professional go for more than a quarter of a century. He maintained a brilliant match record and successively defeated all the leading players of the day in a series of notable jubango (contests between two players consisting of ten games), even forcing them down to handicaps. Some of the defeated were Kitani Minoru, Karigane Junichi, Hashimoto Utaro, Iwamoto Kaoru, Fujisawa Hosai, Sakata Eio, and Takagawa Kaku. Go lost just one jubango, and that was against Fujisawa Hosai. However, the match was played with Fujisawa taking the josen handicap throughout, and Fujisawa only managed to win with a score of 6 to 4. Some ten years later, Go Seigen took revenge on Fujisawa by beating him in two consecutive jubango with lopsided scores of 7–2 and 5–1 respectively. These jubango matches were all played without komi, and indeed the same applied to the vast majority of games Go Seigen played during his career. Go Seigen won the Oteai six times, and won a special Nihon Ki-in championship tournament in 1933.

A table of Go's jubango record is below.

Opponent	Record	Dates played
Kitani Minoru 5p	3 - 3 (started even, abandoned after Kitani was promoted to 6p; handicap not changed)	1933–34
Kitani Minoru 7p	6 - 4 (started even, Kitani was beaten down to sen-ai-sen handicap after 6 games (5-1))	1939–40
Karigane Junichi 8p	4 - 1 (started even, abandoned to avoid possible embarrassment for Karigane, since one more loss would mean Karigane having to play with sen-ai-sen handicap)	1941–42
Fujisawa Kuranosuke 6p, later renamed Fujisawa Hosai	4 - 6 (started with Fujisawa playing with josen handicap; handicap not changed)	1942–44
Hashimoto Utaro 8p	6 - 3 - 1 (started even, Hashimoto was beaten down to sen-ai-sen handicap after 8 games (6-2))	1946–48
Iwamoto Kaoru 8p	7 - 2 - 1 (started even, Iwamoto was beaten down to sen-ai-sen handicap after 6 games (5-1))	1948–49
Against a team of ten players	8 - 1 - 1 (this was a 10-game match, but not a jubango)	1949–50
Hashimoto Utaro 8p	5 - 3 - 2 (started with Hashimoto playing with sen-ai-sen handicap, handicap not changed)	1950–51
Fujisawa Hosai 9p	7 - 2 - 1 (started even, Fujisawa was beaten down to sen-ai-sen handicap after 9 games (6-2-1))	1951–52
Fujisawa Hosai 9p	5 - 1 (abandoned after Fujisawa was beaten down from sen-ai-sen handicap to josen handicap)	1952–53
Sakata Eio 8p	6 - 2 (abandoned after Sakata was beaten down from sen-ai-sen handicap to josen handicap)	1953–54
Takagawa Kaku 8p	6 - 4 (started even, Takagawa was beaten down to sen-ai-sen handicap after 8 games (6-2))	1955–56

== Style ==
Go Seigen was notable for his fast-paced development and playing, fighting style, positional judgment and accurate reading. He settled his groups quickly, got to the big points first, and regularly used much less time in a game than his opponents. He was exceptional at using thickness and making large exchanges. His reading was fast and accurate, and his intuition and positional judgment were often praised. It was also noted that he rarely lost a ko fight that he initiated. Like many players of his time he mastered the Shusaku Opening before switching to his later style.

== Theory ==
In addition to being a peerless match player, Go Seigen has also made great contributions to go theory, especially in the area of fuseki. He is well known, along with Kitani Minoru, as one of the two leading exponents and innovators of the shinfuseki, a period of revolutionary experimentation in the opening of the game that broke away from traditional moves. Go attributed some of his ideas to Honinbo Shuei, for whom he had much respect. As a result of their substantial contributions to go theory, Go Seigen and Kitani Minoru are regarded as the founders of modern go. He was inventor of the notable and revolutionary uchimagari (inward bending) avalanche joseki variation. It was first played during a match against Takagawa Kaku in 1957.

== Matches against the Honinbos ==
During the 1950s, apart from playing the jubango, Go Seigen participated in many three-game special matches against the Honinbo title holders and other notable players. His opponents in these matches included many illustrious names, such as Hashimoto Utaro, Sakata Eio, Takagawa Shukaku, and the ex-Honinbo Iwamoto Kaoru. Go Seigen was also matched against Kubouchi Shuchi, a player from the Kansai Ki-in who had a strong individual style. In these matches, Go Seigen demonstrated an equal dominance over his rivals. He had an excellent record against Takagawa, whose main achievement was winning the Honinbo title for nine consecutive years. In the period between 1951 and 1960, Go won 22 of their games, and Takagawa won 13. By 1960, Sakata had emerged as Go Seigen's most serious rival, but the results of their games between 1950 and 1960 told the same kind of story. Go had 14 wins to Sakata's 9 and one jigo, or draw. At the time the games were played, there was no Komi (in modern era, Black's initial advantage of moving first is offset by komi of 6.5–7.5 points). Because Go Seigen held white most of the time, his record is even more impressive than it appears.

=== Notable game against Honinbo Shusai ===
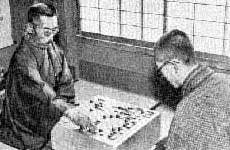
A snapshot of the match. Left is Honinbo Shusai. (Kifu of the infamous match here)

In 1933, Go Seigen won a special Nihon Ki-in tournament to have the opportunity to play a game against Honinbo Shusai Meijin. At that juncture, Honinbo Shusai embodied the highest go authority and tradition in Japan. In addition to inheriting the hereditary title of Honinbo, he was also the holder of the prestigious position of Meijin. The game between Go Seigen and Shusai was thus highly anticipated. The newspapers thought it would be a good business idea to publicize the game as a confrontation between Japan and China. As a consequence, Go Seigen became the unfortunate victim of rising Japanese nationalism. Before and during the game, he was often harassed and threatened by nationalists, and the windows of his house were smashed in.

The game itself began on October 16, 1933, with Go Seigen taking black and lasted for a period of almost three months. During the opening of the game, Go Seigen caused quite a sensation by playing his first three moves at 3-3 (San San), 4-4 (Hoshi) and center (Tengen) points. Such a fuseki had never before been witnessed in a professional game, and the newspapers covering the game recorded top sales all throughout the match. This marked one of the seminal events that pushed the "Shin Fuseki" movement into the mainstream.

Go board, 19 by 19. Moves: 1 black R17; 2 white C16; 3 black D4; 4 white Q3; 5 black K10; 6 white Q16; 7 black R16; 8 white Q15; 9 black P18; 10 white R6; 11 black K4; 12 white M3; 13 black D10; 14 white E16; 15 black M5; 16 white O3; 17 black L3; 18 white M4; 19 black L5; 20 white C12; 21 black G10.912146782013215101915311181712164
Go Seigen (black) v. Honinbo Shusai, shinfuseki opening

The match ended with Honinbo Shusai winning by two points. However, his victory was surrounded by controversies. At the time of the match, the tradition dictated that the player holding white had the right to adjourn the game at any time, and there was no sealing of moves before adjournment. This meant that Shusai, being the nominally stronger player and thus holding white, could adjourn the match whenever it was his turn to move and continue deliberating at home before the match resumed. Shusai shamelessly abused this privilege by adjourning the game more than a dozen times, all at his turn to play. For instance, on the eighth day of the match, Shusai played first, and Go Seigen replied within two minutes, Shusai then thought for three and a half hours, only to adjourn the game. It was no secret that Shusai, during adjournments, discussed and studied the game with his students to come up with the best moves. Go Seigen was therefore put into an especially adverse position for having to take on the entire Honinbo establishment.

Shusai had been trailing all throughout the match when, on the 13th day of the game, he made a brilliant move (W160) that in a single stroke brought him back into the game and guaranteed his victory. However, it was widely rumored that it was not Shusai but one of his students—Maeda Nobuaki—who authored this ingenious move. Even Maeda himself hinted that this move was indeed his idea. Years later, when presented with the opportunities to debunk this rumor, he neither confirmed nor denied it. The game became known as the game of the century.

Go board, 19 by 19. Black stones: E19, P19, B18, C18, D18, E18, P18, B17, F17, K17, R17, G16, H16, O16, R16, G15, L15, M15, N15, O15, P15, F14, H14, K14, O14, S14, H13, P13, Q13, R13, D10, E10, F10, G10, K10, Q10, A9, C9, E9, L9, Q9, C8, E8, J8, M8, O8, Q8, R8, D7, G7, O7, P7, R7, F6, O6, S6, F5, L5, M5, N5, S5, C4, D4, E4, F4, G4, H4, J4, K4, N4, R4, E3, H3, L3, S3, F2, R2, S2. White stones: F18, G18, N18, O18, C17, E17, H17, J17, L17, B16, C16, D16, E16, J16, L16, Q16, H15, J15, K15, Q15, N14, P14, N13, O13, B12, C12, G12, P12, Q12, S12, A11, D11, E11, H11, Q11, B10, C10, O10, R10, R9, H8, S8, C7, E7, F7, M7, Q7, S7, C6, E6, N6, P6, Q6, R6, C5, E5, O5, B4, L4, M4, P4, C3, D3, F3, G3, J3, K3, M3, N3, O3, Q3, R3, D2, E2, G2, H2, Q2. Marks: triangle on white stone at H8; triangle on black stone at J8.△△
Go Seigen (black) v. Honinbo Shusai, W160=$\triangle$, B161=$\triangle$

Five years later in 1938, Go Seigen's great friend Kitani Minoru also played a notable game against Honinbo Shusai (see The Master of Go by Yasunari Kawabata). Due in no small part to having witnessed the treatment Go Seigen received from Shusai in their previous match, Kitani Minoru demanded that the moves be sealed before each adjournment. Initially, Shusai's camp opposed this, but Kitani vehemently insisted, and Shusai eventually gave in. Kitani won that game by a comfortable margin of five points.

== In popular culture ==
In An Unfinished Game, the award-winning 1982 Sino-Japanese co-production, the life of one of the characters has similarities with the life of Go Seigen. The film marked the 10th anniversary of the establishment of diplomatic ties between Japan and the People's Republic of China and is informally known as The Go Masters in the United States.

In 2006, Chinese director Tian Zhuangzhuang made an award-winning biopic film about him entitled The Go Master, starring Taiwanese actor Chang Chen as Go Seigen.

== Rank promotion record ==
Rank	Year	Notes
1 dan		(Was given 3 dan when turning professional.)
2 dan		(Was given 3 dan when turning professional.)
3 dan	1929	Ranking conferred after a series of evaluation games.
4 dan	1930	
5 dan	1932	
6 dan	1934	
7 dan	1939	
8 dan	1942	
9 dan	1950	Via special recommendation by the Nihon Ki-in.

== Tournament victories and runners-up ==
Go was often not allowed or invited to participate in the Japanese tournaments of the day due to political reasons involving his racial background. Additionally, half of Go's career was before the rise of title matches. As such, there are very few title or tournament victories by him. Nonetheless, his strength was most aptly demonstrated in his famed one-on-one matches with the peers of his day.

Title	Won	Runner-up
(Japan) 6-dan Winners' Oteai	1936	
All-Japan Go Championship		1935
Japan Championship (Yomiuri Shimbun event)	1933	
(Japan) NHK Cup		1976
(Japan) Old Meijin		1962
(Japan) Oteai	1930 (Autumn), 1931 (Autumn), 1932 (Spring), 1933 (Autumn), 1935 (Spring), 1942 (Spring),	1932 (Autumn), 1933 (Spring), 1934 (Spring)
(Japan) Saikyo	1958, 1961 (tied with Sakata Eio)	

== Awards ==
Award	Years won
(Japan) Honorary Member of the Nihon Ki-in	1983?
(Japan) Okura Prize	1967
