= Kita Fumiko =

Japanese Go player

Kita Fumiko (喜多 文子; 1875–1950) was an important Japanese professional 8-dan go player. Born Shiba Fumi, she was adopted by Hayashi Sano, a strong Meiji-era player and member of the Hayashi house. Fumiko achieved the professional rank of 1-dan at the Hoensha in 1889 and married the famous Noh actor, Kita Roppeita, in 1895, after which she was known as Kita Fumiko. After some years away from go she resumed her career in 1907 and rose through the ranks, reaching 6-dan in 1938. In 1924, at the time of the formation of the Nihon Ki-in, she played a key role as a mediator between rival factions. She is known affectionately as the mother of women's go in Japan; virtually all of the women professionals before the second world war were her pupils. There is an essay titled "The Art of Resigning" in Noriyuki Nakayama's book The Treasure Chest Enigma describing young Fumiko's difficult relationship with her mother, Hayashi Sano. A more detailed article may be found on Sensei's Library. In recognition of her contributions to modern go she was inducted into the Nihon Ki-in Hall of Fame in 2013.
