= Hon'inbō Shūwa =

Japanese Go player

Honinbo Shuwa
Personal information
- Native name: 本因坊秀和 (Japanese)
- Full name: Honinbo Shuwa
- Born: c. 1820 Japan
- Died: 1873 (aged 52–53) Japan

Sport

Hon'inbō Shūwa (本因坊秀和, c. 1820–1873) was a Japanese professional Go player, and also the fourteenth head of the Hon'inbō house from 1847 to 1873.

== Career ==
Shūwa's most significant games were probably the three challenge games of 1840 and 1842 against Inoue Gennan Inseki. After Jowa's resignation of the post of Meijin godokoro in 1839, Gennan was making yet another run for the post of Meijin godokoro when the Honinbo house lodged a complaint with the government, leading to the first game between Shūwa and Gennan in 1840. Shuwa won this game by 4 points (on black), leaving Gennan so dismayed by his strength that he discontinued the series and withdrew his application. The subsequent games in 1842 were attempts by Gennan to show he could beat Shūwa taking white (even though he could take black every 3rd game, as befitted a difference of 1 dan rank), but he was beaten twice more, the second time by 6 points and the third time by 4 points. After these 3 losses Gennan resigned himself to retiring as an 8-dan, despite the fact that he was recognized by many (including his great rival Jōwa) as being equivalent to Meijin in strength.

Shūwa's comprehensive victories over Gennan established himself as the pre-eminent player of the day. He reached 8-dan soon after his triumph, and his only serious rivals in the prime of his career were the group known as the Tempo Top Four – Yasui Sanchi, Itō Shōwa, Ōta Yūzō, and Sakaguchi Sentoku. Although he played some games with the members of this group on even terms, he generally gave them a handicap. He found Sanchi to be his most difficult opponent, and Yūzō to be his easiest.

Unfortunately, Shūwa's aspirations to be Meijin were undone by a variety of factors. The primary problem was the instability of the Tokugawa regime in its final decade, which gave very little thought to matters of Go in its final years. Shūwa also suffered a critical defeat at the hands of the 13th Inoue, Matsumoto Inseki. Matsumoto was certainly not in Shūwa's class as a Go player, but Shūwa perhaps made too leisurely a start in his game, allowing Matsumoto two shimaris in the fuseki. When Shūwa realized he was not catching up as easily as normal he exerted himself fully, but Matsumoto was just able to hold him off and score an improbable 1-point victory (taking black). It was said at the time that Matsumoto was possessed by the spirit of Gennan Inseki, and Shūwa was forced to abandon his ambitions of becoming Meijin.

Nonetheless, he remained at the pinnacle of the Go world until his death in 1873. The end of his life was at the worst point of go's fortunes after the Meiji Restoration. He lived to see the Hon'inbō residence in Edo (Tokyo) taken back by the state in 1869 The family members for a while resumed the family name Tsuchiya.

While his reputation is somewhat overshadowed by that of his brilliant, pious and short-lived pupil Hon'inbō Shūsaku, it is undecided and to an extent imponderable who was the stronger, the typical playing conditions of the time meaning that they did not test this in matches played purely as competition. Shūsaku's games having been published soon after his death, they became a training manual, adding to the impression of the pupil's level. Shūsaku possessed an unusual modesty, and would always take black against out of respect for his teacher, even upon reaching 7-dan. Shūwa played a famous 17 game series with Shūsaku between 1846 and 1847, which contained some of the best Go of the classical era. Taking white in all games, Shūwa lost the series 4-13, and his overall results against Shusaku were 6-17-1, but in light of the handicaps and Shūsaku's natural brilliance at the Go board, it is virtually impossible to compare the two players.

Shūwa's style was unspectacular but thoroughly professional. His style with Black epitomized the values of classical Go – making one's groups safe and strong early on. He is greatly admired by modern professionals for his light, flexible play, as well as his refinement and mastery of "amashi" when playing with white. Although he did not officially reach the rank of 9-dan (Meijin), he is honored as one of the Four Sages (players who were said to be of Meijin strength but only reached 8-dan) alongside Hon'inbō Genjo, Yasui Chitoku Senchi, and Gennan Inseki.

Apart from his genius on the Go board, Shūwa is also famous for his pupils and sons. Three of his natural sons became head of house after him: Hon'inbō Shūetsu, Hon'inbō Shūei and Hon'inbō Shūgen were respectively his eldest, second and third sons. In addition, he gave generous amounts of his time to his pupils Hon'inbō Shūsaku and Murase Shūho, who went on to become 18th Hon'inbō.

One of the factors in the eventual revival of organised go was a study group called "Third Day Meeting" that Shūwa himself had set up, when the oshirogo ceased in the early 1860s. This grouping survived and contributed to the later Hoensha.

== Awards ==
- He was inducted into the Nihon Ki-in Hall of Fame in 2006.

Preceded by Hon'inbō Jōsaku	Hon'inbō; 1847–1873	Succeeded by Hon'inbō Shūetsu
