= Hon'inbō Shūetsu =

Personal information
- Native name: 本因坊秀悦 (Japanese)
- Full name: Hon'inbō Shūetsu
- Born: 1850 Japan
- Died: August 1890 (aged 39–40) Japan

Sport

Hon'inbō Shūetsu (本因坊秀悦, 1850 – 23 August 1890) was a Japanese professional Go player, and fifteenth head of the Hon'inbō house.

== Biography ==
He came young to the headship on the death of his father Hon'inbō Shūwa. He was the eldest son, but Murase Shūho had claims to be the natural successor. Shūetsu's time was marked by intrigue, illness, and the collapse of the old order based on state support of the game of go, that had been in place for around 250 years. Shūetsu relinquished control of the house, to the next brother, Shūho being kept in the cold.

Preceded by Hon'inbō Shūwa	Hon'inbō; 1873–1879	Succeeded by Hon'inbō Shūgen
