= Takabe =

Takabe (written: 高部) is a Japanese surname. Notable people with the surname include:

- Ai Takabe (高部 あい, born 1988), Japanese actress and voice actress
- Akira Takabe (高部 聖, born 1982), Japanese footballer
- Dohei Takabe (高部 道平, 1881–1951), Japanese Go player
