= Hon'inbō Hakugen =

Japanese Go player

Personal information
- Full name: Hon'inbō Hakugen
- Born: 1726 Japan
- Died: 1754 (aged 27–28) Japan

Sport
- Rank: 6 dan

Hon'inbō Hakugen (本因坊伯元, 1726–1754) was a Japanese professional go player, and eighth head of the Hon'inbō house. He reached 6 dan level.

Preceded by Hon'inbō Shūhaku	Hon'inbō; 1741–1754	Succeeded by Hon'inbō Satsugen
