= Honinbo Shuhaku =

Japanese Go player

Hon'inbō Shūhaku
Personal information
- Native name: 本因坊秀伯 (Japanese)
- Full name: Hon'inbō Shūhaku
- Born: 1716 Japan
- Died: 1741 (aged 24–25) Japan

Sport
- Rank: 6 dan

Hon'inbō Shūhaku (本因坊秀伯, 1716–1741) was a Japanese professional go player and seventh head of Hon'inbō house. His succession to his short-lived predecessor, in 1733, was irregular, since he had not been officially adopted as heir. He also died young, after a period of intrigue. His greatest match was against Inoue Shunseki.

Preceded by Hon'inbō Chihaku	Hon'inbō; 1733–1741	Succeeded by Hon'inbō Hakugen
