= Tsuzuki Yoneko =

Japanese Go player (1872–1937)

Tsuzuki Yoneko (都筑 米子, Tsuzuki Yoneko; 1872–1937) was a Japanese female professional Go player, and a disciple of Honinbo Shuei. She and Katsuko Ito (伊藤甲子) visited China in 1930, and were the first female Japanese Go players who visited China.
