= Dohei Takabe =

Japanese Go player

Personal information
- Native name: 高部 道平 (Japanese)
- Full name: Dōhei Takabe
- Born: 1881 Unknown, Japan
- Died: 1951 (aged 69–70)

Sport
- Teacher: Honinbo Shuei
- Rank: 7 dan
- Affiliation: Kiseisha, Keiinsha

Dohei Takabe (高部 道平, Takabe Dōhei; 1881 – October 19, 1951) was a professional 7 dan Go player.

== Biography ==
Takabe was a pupil of Honinbo Shuei, the 17th and 19th head of the Honinbō house. In the 1920s, he joined the Kiseisha, a splinter group of the Nihon Ki-in, Japan's main administrative body for Go. The Kiseisha was succeeded by the Keiinsha, of which Takabe was also a member, until 1991 when the last of its members died. In addition, he was one of the five Hiseikai, a group formed in 1922 and devoted to tournament play. The other members of the Hiseikai were Chiyotaro Onoda, Segoe Kensaku, Tamejiro Suzuki and Karigane Junichi.

Nakano Kiichiro was Takabe's only pupil.
