= Kaoru Iwamoto =

Japanese Go Player

Personal information
- Native name: 岩本薫 (Japanese)
- Full name: Kaoru Iwamoto
- Born: February 5, 1902 Masuda, Japan
- Died: November 29, 1999 (aged 97)

Sport
- Teacher: Hirose Heijiro
- Rank: 9 dan

Kaoru Iwamoto (岩本薫, Iwamoto Kaoru; February 5, 1902 – November 29, 1999), also known as Honinbo Kunwa, was a Japanese professional Go player and writer who achieved the rank of 9-dan.

== Biography ==
Iwamoto was born in Masuda of Shimane Prefecture, Japan. During his childhood he spent several years in Busan, Korea (1905–1913), where he learned Go from his father.

He returned to Japan to study Go, moved to Tokyo, and became a disciple of Hirose Heijiro 6-dan of Hoensha in 1913. He achieved 1-dan in 1917, and swiftly rose through the ranks. In 1924, when the Nihon Ki-in was established, Iwamoto joined it and achieved the rank of 6-dan.

He retired as a professional Go player and emigrated to Brazil as a coffee farmer in 1929. However, he came back to Japan and resumed his career of Go after the failure of this venture in 1931.

He won the Oteai, the most important tournament in Japan at that time, in 1935. He became the challenger in the third Honinbo match against Hashimoto Utaro in 1945. The second game of this match, played in the outskirts of Hiroshima, is famous as the atomic bomb go game. The players owed their lives to the fact that the local police had ordered the game moved from the center of Hiroshima. The match was continued after the war but ended in a 3-3 draw. A three-game playoff was held in 1946, with Iwamoto winning two straight games to take the Honinbo title. He assumed the name Honinbo Kunwa.

== After the war ==
Iwamoto's home was a temporary site for the Nihon Ki-in which was burnt out by the B-29 bombing in 1945, and he was instrumental in finding new headquarters for the Nihon Ki-in.

Iwamoto defended the Honinbo title against Kitani Minoru in 1947, and in 1948 achieved 8-dan, becoming president of the Nihon Ki-in. He later lost the Honinbo title to Hashimoto Utaro in 1950. He won the NHK Cup in 1955.

Iwamoto traveled extensively throughout the West with the aim of spreading Go to Western people. He spent 18 months in 1961-1962 in New York, teaching and promoting Go. He achieved 9-dan in 1967, and had many disciples, including James Kerwin, the first Westerner to achieve professional status at the Nihon Ki-in.

== Retirement and later life ==
Iwamoto retired in April, 1983. In his later years he was the main benefactor to several European and American Go centers in London, São Paulo, New York, Seattle and Amsterdam, largely through setting up the Iwamoto Foundation in 1986, with an initial contribution of 530 million yen.

He is the author of three books in English, "Go for Beginners", "Keshi and Uchikomi" and "The 1971 Honinbo Tournament ".

In 2014, the Nihon Ki-in and the American Go Association jointly founded the Iwamoto North America Foundation for Go, in order to "foster, promulgate, and develop the game and culture of Go in North America according to the vision and wishes of the late Japanese Go master, Iwamoto Kaoru."

Sporting positions
Preceded by Kensaku Segoe	Director of the Japan Go Association (Nihon Ki-in); 1948–1949	Succeeded by Juichi Tsushima
