= Hon'inbō Shūgen =

Japanese Go player

Personal information
- Native name: 本因坊 秀元 (Japanese)
- Full name: Hon'inbō Shūgen
- Born: 1854 Japan
- Died: September 1917 (aged 62–63) Japan

Sport

Hon'inbō Shugen (本因坊 秀元, 1854 – 5 September 1917) was a Japanese professional go player. He was twice head of the Hon'inbō house, being both the sixteenth and the twentieth head.

== Biography ==
While not an outstanding exponent of the game by the standards set earlier in the 19th century, Shugen twice took over Honinbo leadership, essentially as a stopgap leader. On the first occasion, the go world was coping with the declining interest in the game produced by the Meiji Restoration.

Preceded by Hon'inbō Shūetsu	Hon'inbō; 1879–1884	Succeeded by Hon'inbō Shūei
Preceded by Hon'inbō Shūei	Hon'inbō; 1907–1908	Succeeded by Hon'inbō Shūsai
