= Hon'inbō Shūei =

Japanese Go player

Personal information
- Native name: 本因坊秀栄 (Japanese)
- Full name: Hon'inbō Shūei
- Born: November 1, 1852 Japan
- Died: February 10, 1907 (aged 54) Japan

Sport
- Teacher: Hon'inbō Shūwa
- Rank: 9 dan

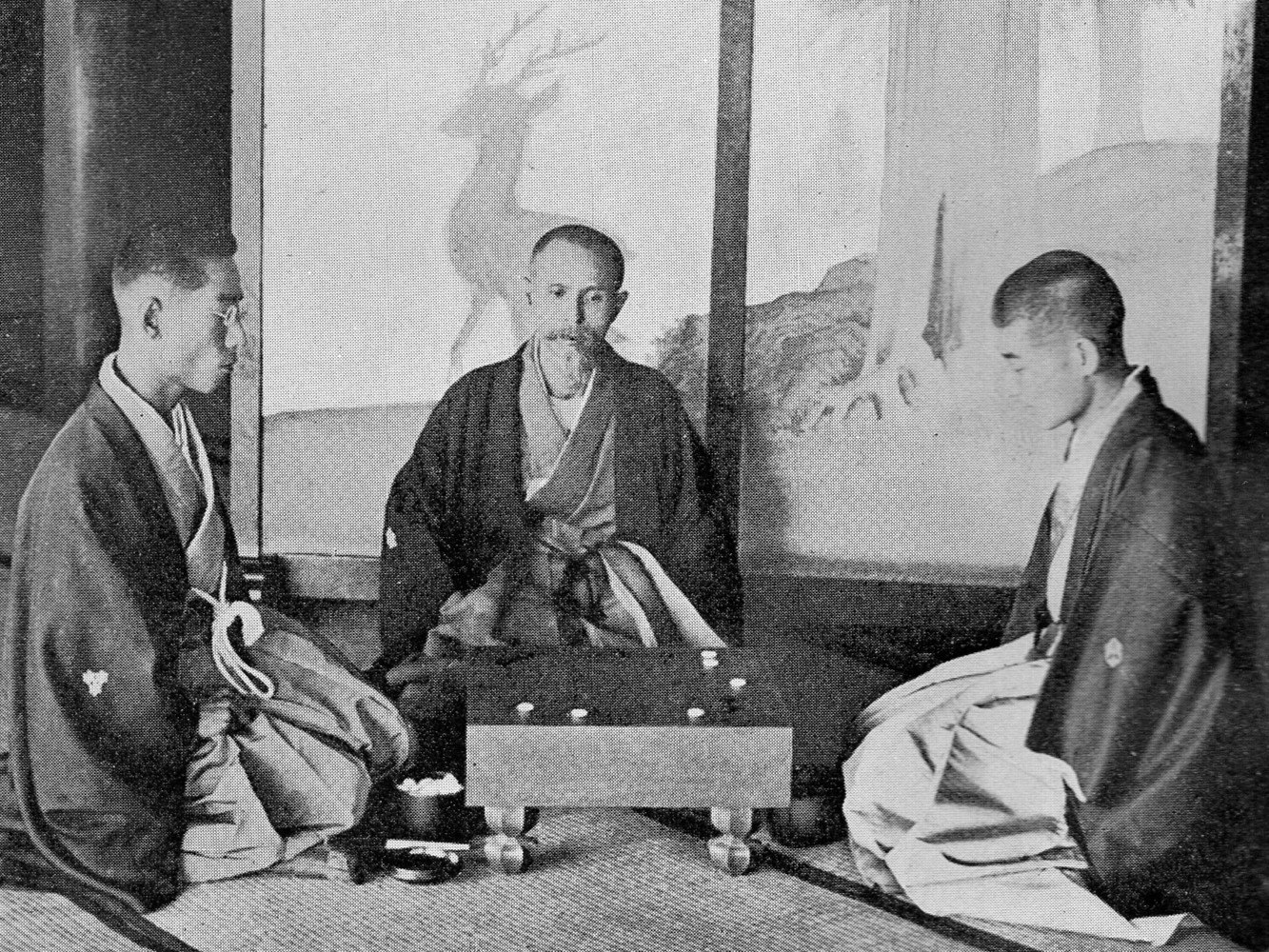
Honinbo Shusai, Honinbo Shuei, Karigane Junichi

Hon'inbō Shūei (本因坊秀栄, November 1, 1852 – February 10, 1907) was a Japanese professional Go player.

== Biography ==
Hon'inbō Shūei, a younger son of the very strong Hon'inbō Shūwa, served as the 17th and again 19th head of the Hon'inbō house. He was also the 13th and final head of the Hayashi house before merging it with the Hon'inbō house in 1884.

Hon'inbō Shūei was a remarkable player, and his strength apparently exceeded his contemporaries by a considerable margin. Surviving game records show that he played a large number of handicap games. He was very active and innovative in the 1890s, a time of reviving fortunes for go, and participated in a number of jubango.

He attained the title of Meijin in 1906, becoming the ninth person to have done so. Shūei's style was characterized by his calm and confident approach to the game and his supreme positional judgement. He was also fond of making light shapes and sabaki tactics. He earned the nickname "the master of miai" for creating situations where he would have two equally good options at his disposal. He was one of the pioneer players opening frequently at hoshi points during fuseki, for which he was later greatly admired by the great Go Seigen.

He has also received praise from another top player, Fujisawa Hideyuki. Fujisawa commented in Go World that he thought Shūei was the strongest of the Meijins and Hon'inbōs and in particular that Hon'inbō Shūei was stronger than Hon'inbō Shūsaku and Hon'inbō Dōsaku, regarded by many as the two strongest of the Edo era. He went on to say that Shūei's flow of moves was like water. Fujisawa said, "I always have the feeling that I'd be no match for him ... I'm far below his level". Yet another top player Kobayashi Koichi also stated that Shūei was stronger than he was. Still another leading player, Takagawa Kaku was strongly influenced by Shūei, and edited a collection of his games, and wrote:

When I was young I often enjoyed playing over the games of Shūei. That was because I liked the image of him winning without doing anything at all unreasonable. But today I wonder: did I really understand Shūei to that extent? In doing the commentaries for this book, I perused his collected games again after a long interval, and again was made to sigh in admiration at his strength. In particular his games as White after he reached 7-dan hide a fathomless strength amidst a serene and well-balanced flow, which we can perhaps describe as flexible on the outside, unbendable on the inside. In brief, the characteristic of Shūei's skill at go is not just about local things such as his skill at evaluating positions or his skill in seeing moves, but his mastery of go itself.

Ironically, as a boy he was given to the Hayashi house because he supposedly showed little promise. And the first time he was appointed Honinbo, he resigned in favor of Murase Shūho, his long time friend, with whom he had travelled Japan and who was the strongest player at the time (8-dan). This event also marked the reconciliation between the Hon'inbō house and the Hoensha. It was celebrated with a jubango between Shūho and Shūei with the score being 5-5 (Shūei playing on all black). Shūho did not live very long, so Shūei accepted the title again, and later became much stronger than his contemporaries, so was awarded the Meijin title, which even his father had not achieved.

Shuei had a number of disciples. They include Hon'inbō Shūgen, Takabe Dohei, Karigane Junichi, Nozawa Chikucho, Tamura Yasuhisa (later known as Honinbo Shusai, Meijin), Tanaka Masaki, Inoue Yasunobu, Hayashi Tokuzo, Seki Genkichi, Tsuzuki Yoneko, and Inoue Kohei.

== Notes ==
Preceded by Hon'inbō Jōwa	Meijin; 1906–1907	Succeeded by Hon'inbō Shūsai
Preceded by Hon'inbō Shūgen	Hon'inbō; 1884–1886	Succeeded by Hon'inbō Shūho
Preceded by Hon'inbō Shūho	Hon'inbō; 1887–1907	Succeeded by Hon'inbō Shūgen
Preceded by Hayashi Hakuei	Head of Hayashi house 1864–1884	Succeeded by Hayashi house merged into Hon'inbō house
