= Hon'inbō Jōsaku =

Japanese Go player

Honinbo Josaku
Personal information
- Full name: Honinbo Josaku
- Born: 1801 Japan
- Died: 1847 (aged 45–46) Japan

Sport

Hon'inbō Jōsaku (本因坊丈策, 1803–1847) was a Japanese professional go player and the thirteenth head of the Hon'inbō school. He was not in the same top-rank class over the board as either his predecessor Jōwa or his successor Shūwa.

| Preceded by Hon'inbō Jōwa | Hon'inbō; 1839–1847 | Succeeded by Hon'inbō Shūwa |
