= Honinbo =

Title of the head of the Honinbo house or the winner of the Honinbo Tournament

Honinbo (or Hon'inbō, 本因坊) is a title used by the head of the Honinbo house or the winner of the Honinbo tournament.

== Honinbo house ==
The Honinbo house was a school of Go players officially founded in 1612 and discontinued in 1940.

The founder was the Buddhist priest Nikkai. The name Honinbo was that of the pavilion on the grounds of the Jakkoji temple in Kyoto where Nikkai lived. When the capital was moved to Tokyo, Nikkai moved along and turned "Honinbo" into a title, calling himself Honinbo Sansa.

=== Heads of the Honinbo house ===
- 1st Honinbo, Sansa (算砂, 1612-1623)
- 2nd Honinbo, San'etsu (算悦, 1630-1658)
- 3rd Honinbo, Dōetsu (道悦, 1658-1677)
- 4th Honinbo, Dōsaku (道策, 1677-1702)
  - appointed successor, Dōteki (道的) (died early)
  - appointed successor, Sakugen(策元)
- 5th Honinbo, Dōchi (道知, 1702-1727)
- 6th Honinbo, Chihaku (知伯, 1727-1733)
- 7th Honinbo, Shuhaku (秀伯, 1733-1741)
- 8th Honinbo, Hakugen (伯元, 1741-1754)
- 9th Honinbo, Satsugen (察元, 1754-1788)
- 10th Honinbo, Retsugen (烈元, 1788-1808)
- 11th Honinbo, Genjo (元丈, 1809-1827)
- 12th Honinbo, Jōwa (丈和, 1827-1839)
- 13th Honinbo, Josaku (丈策, 1839-1847)
- 14th Honinbo, Shuwa (秀和, 1847-1873)
  - appointed successor, Shūsaku (秀策)
- 15th Honinbo, Shuetsu (秀悦, 1873-1879)
- 16th Honinbo, Shugen (秀元, 1879-1884)
- 17th Honinbo, Shuei (秀栄, 1884-1886)
- 18th Honinbo, Shuho (秀甫, 1886)
- 19th Honinbo, Shuei (秀栄, 1887-1907)
- 20th Honinbo, Shugen (秀元, 1907-1908)
- 21st Honinbo, Shūsai (秀哉, 1908-1940)

Note: The 17th and 19th Honinbo are the same person, and the 16th and 20th are the same, too.

The titles 22nd-26th Honinbo are honorary titles given to players who won the Honinbo tournament sufficiently often.

== Honinbo tournament ==
The Honinbo Tournament is a yearly tournament for the title of Honinbo, held since the retirement of Shūsai.

=== First Honinbo tournament ===
The last Honinbo, Shusai, gave (or sold) his title in 1938 to the Nihon Ki-in, to be awarded in a yearly tournament. Preliminary tournaments were held in 1939 and 1940, and the final title match, between Sekiyama Riichi and Kato Shin, in 1941. This match ended in a tie, 3-3. Since Sekiyama had been first after the preliminary tournaments, he was declared winner. Thus, Sekiyama Riichi became the first to bear this new title Honinbo.

=== Honinbo name ===
Some winners of the Honinbo tournament choose an art name (professional name). For the first two the name was chosen by the Nihon Ki-in. For example, Sekiyama was called Honinbo Risen (本因坊 利仙).

Players that used a Honinbo name
player	year	Honinbo name
Sekiyama Riichi	1941	Honinbo Risen (利仙)
Hashimoto Utaro	1943	Honinbo Shou (昭宇)
Iwamoto Kaoru	1945	Honinbo Kunwa (薫和)
Takagawa Kaku	1952	Honinbo Shukaku (秀格)
Sakata Eio	1961	Honinbo Eiju (栄寿)
Rin Kaiho	1968	Honinbo Kaiho (海峯)
Ishida Yoshio	1971	Honinbo Shuho (秀芳)
Takemiya Masaki	1976	Honinbo Shuju (秀樹)
Kato Masao	1977	Honinbo Kensei (劔正)
Cho Chikun	1981	Honinbo Chikun (治勲)
Takao Shinji	2005	Honinbo Shushin (秀紳)
Yamashita Keigo	2010	Honinbo Dowa (道吾)
Iyama Yuta	2012	Honinbo Monyu (文裕)

For more details, see ja:本因坊#本因坊戦勝者と雅号

== Further Honinbo tournaments ==
There are now several further tournaments with names involving 'Honinbo', such as the Women's Honinbo tournament, the Amateur Honinbo tournament, and the Student Honinbo tournament.

Since 1963, there is a yearly game between the current professional Honinbo and the Amateur Honinbo.

== Sources ==
- Richard Bozulich, The Go players almanac, Kiseido Press 2001, Chapter 10.
- Go: International handbook and dictionary, Ishi Press 1972.
- Andrew Grant and John Fairbairn, 400 Years of Go in Japan, Slate and Shell 2004.
