= Hon'inbō Jōwa =

Honinbo Jowa
Personal information
- Native name: 本因坊丈和 (Japanese)
- Full name: Honinbo Jowa
- Born: 1787 Japan
- Died: 1847 (aged 59–60) Japan

Sport
- Rank: 8 dan

Honinbo Jowa (本因坊丈和, original name Todani Matsunosuke, 1787–1847) served as 12th Hon'inbō from 1827 and Meijin Godokoro from 1831 until 1839, when he was forced into retirement.

Jōwa was born in Nagano, Japan, in 1787. It was said that Jōwa had great strength without equal. Historically he was accorded the title "latter sage" to match Dōsaku who was known as the "former sage". At some point in the Meiji Era this title was transferred to the more popular Shūsaku, as word was spread that Jōwa used the contacts that Hayashi Genbi had within the government to help him attain the Meijin Godokoro position. However, even without playing a sogo, Jōwa's strength was still apparent.

Later on in his life, Jōwa also played one of the most famous games in Go history known as the "Blood-vomiting game". Gennan Inseki, a rival of Jōwa's who had seen the coveted position of Meijin godokoro snatched away from him through less than honorable means, persuaded a rapidly improving pupil of his, Akaboshi Intetsu, to play a game on black against Jōwa. Although Gennan, an 8-dan, would probably take black the majority of the time against Jōwa in a challenge match, he thought it would be more effective to have Akaboshi, a 7-dan, play against Jōwa. If Jōwa lost, he intended to argue that Jōwa could certainly not be qualified to be Meijin if he could not defeat a 7-dan. The match started with Jōwa making an unreasonably aggressive move in the fuseki, and Akaboshi countering with a variation of the taisha joseki that was developed secretly in the Inoue house. However, as the four-day-long game progressed, Jowa slowly clawed his way into the lead by playing three famous moves known as the "Ghost Moves". The three moves were supposedly brought to Jōwa by ghosts, allowing him to grind Intetsu's lead away.

In the end, Jōwa won, and as the stones were being cleared from the board, Akaboshi kneeled over the board and coughed up blood. Within a few weeks, he was dead. Gennan's tactics for discrediting Jowa's worthiness of being appointed Meijin backfired spectacularly, as this game was the supreme triumph of Jōwa's career.

== Notes ==
Preceded by Hon'inbō Satsugen	Meijin; 1831–1839	Succeeded by Honinbo Shuei
Preceded by Hon'inbō Genjō	Hon'inbō; 1827–1839	Succeeded by Hon'inbō Jōsaku
