= List of Hikaru no Go characters =

The plot of Hikaru no Go revolves around the Japanese Go world. Several of the manga's prominent characters hold Go titles. The title holder is then called by a combination of their name and the title they hold. In the case of a multiple title holder the most prestigious title they hold is used. The 7 major titles mentioned are Kisei, Meijin, Honinbō, Jūdan, Tengen, Ōza, and Gosei.

== Main characters ==
=== Hikaru Shindo ===
Hikaru Shindo (進藤 ヒカル, Shindō Hikaru)
Voiced by: Tomoko Kawakami (Japanese); Samuel Vincent (English)

Hikaru is the Main protagonist of Hikaru no Go and a sixth grader in elementary school. An important factor in the development of Hikaru's passion for Go is an encounter early on in which Hikaru becomes the rival of Go prodigy Akira Toya. At first, he thinks that Go is just for old folks and he is annoyed at Sai's demand to play, but little by little his passion for Go increases as he plays more and more. From being a member of a school Go club to becoming an Insei and finally a professional Go player (at 14 years old with three losses) a year after Akira, Hikaru matures throughout the course of the series. Throughout the series, Hikaru gets older in age as the series follow him from 6th grade to high school. Hikaru is often portrayed wearing clothing having the numeral "5". This is a pun on the Japanese word for five: 五, which is pronounced go. Part of his strength is his ability to read far into the game very fast, and to make seemingly stupid moves, which, in fact, lure the opponent to playing what looks like the obviously correct move, which Hikaru then uses against them.

=== Fujiwara no Sai ===
Fujiwara no Sai (藤原佐為)
Voiced by: Susumu Chiba (Japanese); Brad Swaile (English)

A spirit from the Heian era of Japan and mentor of Hikaru Shindo. Once the Go instructor to the Emperor, Sai continually plays Go, his goal being to one day play the divine move. Sai's ghost had previously possessed the real-life figure Honinbo Shusaku who became a renowned Go player. Sai holds a rivalry towards Koyo Toya and through Hikaru persuades Koyo to have a game with him; with his wish realized when they play a game through the Internet. After the legendary match that ends with Sai's triumph by the narrowest margin (a ½ point), Hikaru discovers another move which would have turned the game around. Witnessing Hikaru's maturity, Sai comes to feel that his one-thousand-year time in the world is going to end without his fulfilling his wish of obtaining the divine move; but he reasons that perhaps he was fated to awaken and teach Hikaru, who might obtain it in the future. A few days after the game with Koyo, Sai suddenly disappears as he feared he would. Hikaru was dozing during their last game, so he could neither terminate his last match with Hikaru nor say goodbye to him. Sai is gone, leaving Hikaru depressed and wanting to quit the game. When Hikaru plays Isumi, Hikaru realizes that he will continue to play Go, for Sai lives on in Hikaru's Go. Extremely effeminate by today's standards, Sai is often drawn with traditionally feminine features and mannerisms. Yumi Hotta has joked about fans mistakenly calling him a "she" in the "intermission" pages of the manga. Sai's extremely emotional behavior is also proper for a Heian male; he sometimes cries copiously in chibi style, soaking his long sleeves with tears, which in his own time would be respected as a sign of intelligence and sensitivity. His name Fujiwara suggests that he is related to a noble family of extremely high prestige in the Heian period, the Fujiwara clan. Sai has a high sense of honor, abhorring cheating and bullying.

=== Akira Toya ===
Akira Toya (塔矢 アキラ, Tōya Akira)
Voiced by: Sanae Kobayashi (Japanese); Scott Perrie (English)

Hikaru's biggest rival and Kaio Middle School student. The son of Koyo Toya, Akira is already playing Go at a professional level when Hikaru first begins playing. Akira is amazed by Hikaru's seemingly impossible ability and becomes obsessed with discovering the secret behind Hikaru's strength. Meanwhile, Hikaru is impressed with how serious and focused Akira is on the game despite only being a 6th grader like him. As the series goes along, the plot brings these two characters together to play each other under different circumstances, each time adding to the mystery.

== Haze Middle School ==
=== Akari Fujisaki ===
Akari Fujisaki (藤崎 あかり, Fujisaki Akari)
Voiced by: Yumi Kakazu (Japanese); Chantal Strand (English)

Hikaru's childhood friend. She learns a little bit about Go, when Hikaru becomes interested, and she later joins the Haze Middle School Go club, serving as vice captain of the girls' team, despite her being a weak player. She loves Hikaru, as noted by her two friends and various other characters. Hikaru shows interest in her only little by little, though. The two remain friends throughout the course of the series.

=== Kimihiro Tsutsui ===
Kimihiro Tsutsui (筒井 公宏, Tsutsui Kimihiro)
Voiced by: Makoto Tsumura (Japanese); Keith Miller (English)

Captain and founder of the Haze Middle School Go Club. Initially he relies on a strategy book, though he has excellent Yose (end game) skills. Kaga persuades him to abandon the book in favor of trusting his strength. When he founded the Haze Middle School Go club he is the only member, but through the efforts of Hikaru and Akari the club grows. Kimihiro graduates from Haze Middle School before his dream of defeating the Kaio Middle School Go club can be realized.

=== Tetsuo Kaga ===
Tetsuo Kaga (加賀 鉄男, Kaga Tetsuo)
Voiced by: Kentarō Itō (Japanese); Andrew Toth (English)

President of Haze Middle School's Shogi club. Kaga hates Go and prefers Shogi because his father forbade it and forced him to play Go from an extremely early age, and he could never please the old man no matter how well he did, because he always lost to Akira Toya. In a flashback to Kaga's childhood, he is not only defeated by Akira, he feels disrespected by Akira's detached attitude towards his opponents. He still plays Go from time to time to keep his skills limber. During the course of the series, he (along with Kimihiro Tsutsui) graduates from Haze Middle School.

=== Masako Kaneko ===
A player at the Go Club who is also a member of the Volleyball Club

=== Yuki Mitani ===
Yuki Mitani (三谷 祐輝, Mitani Yūki)
Voiced by: Yuu Asakawa (Japanese); Cathy Weseluck (English)

A player at the Go Club at Haze Middle School who overcomes his cheating habit. He is angry at Hikaru for choosing to be an Insei rather than stay at the school Go club when they have a tournament around the corner. Yuki and Hikaru are no longer seen as friends. When After Sai leaves and Hikaru said he wants to stop playing go, Yuki got mad at him because he left the club and got so far he became a pro to catch up to Akira Toya, and now he wants to quit. Yuki remains in the Go club, but only after much convincing.

=== Kumiko Tsuda ===
Voiced by: Akeno Watanabe (Japanese); Justine Wong (English)

Kumiko Tsuda is one of Akari Fujisaki's friends and student in Haze Middle School.

=== Natsume ===
A male member of Haze Middle School's Go Club.

=== Hitoshi Koike ===
A member of the Go Club.

== Insei ==
=== Yoshitaka Waya ===
Yoshitaka Waya (和谷 義高, Waya Yoshitaka)
Voiced by: Reiko Takagi (Japanese); Matthew Erickson (English)

Hikaru's "big brother" Insei. Like Kaga, he has a dislike for Akira Toya because he can never defeat him and because of what he perceives as Akira's disdain for his opponents. He has once faced Sai in internet Go using the nickname 'zelda.' He becomes a pro (at age 15) in the same year as Hikaru with three losses. He is also known to be very reckless and short-tempered, even punching former Insei Mashiba in the face because the latter rattled his friend Isumi.

=== Shinichiro Isumi ===
Shinichiro Isumi (伊角 慎一郎, Isumi Shin'ichirō)
Voiced by: Kenichi Suzumura (Japanese); Kristian Ayre (English)

Another Insei friendly with Hikaru, Isumi is the eldest in Hikaru's peer group, turning 18 during the series. He does very well as a forerunner in the first pro exam shown, going undefeated until his match with Hikaru. During that match, rumors about Hikaru's incredible strength add to the pressure of time constraints, and he misplaces a stone; his attempt to move the stone after letting go of it prompts his honorable resignation before Hikaru can accuse him of cheating. The match weighs on his mind and he loses his next two games and the chance to become a pro, ultimately ending with four losses. He later goes to study Go in China in one of the few character arcs in the series that does not center on Hikaru. There, he learns to control his emotions and passes the next year's pro exam without a single loss. Isumi also unknowingly helps Hikaru get over his grief for Sai when their practice game makes Hikaru realize that by playing, he can find Sai within his moves, the Go that Sai passed on to Hikaru.

=== Kosuke Ochi ===
Kosuke Ochi (越智 康介, Ochi Kōsuke)
Voiced by: Youko Matsuoka (Japanese); Burkley Duffield (English)

Yet another Insei in the same group as Hikaru, Ochi is one of the youngest (12 years old when introduced), yet very outspoken about his ability. His bragging about his strength hides his insecurity; after each loss he is known to disappear into the restroom for long periods of time. Akira tutors him to find out about Hikaru's current strength. Ochi is unnerved by Hikaru because Akira's obsession about him seems to suggest there is more to Hikaru than what Ochi knows. Ochi is also angry that Akira acknowledges Hikaru as a rival, but not Ochi himself. He demands that Akira view him as a rival if he can defeat Hikaru in the pro exam. Ochi loses to Hikaru, but does pass the pro exam with the highest score and only two losses. He comes from a wealthy family, as evidenced by the number of pros that come to his household to tutor him privately in Go.

=== Toshinori Honda ===
Toshinori Honda (本田敏則, Honda Toshinori)
Voiced by: Takahiro Sakurai (Japanese); Scott Logie (English)

Toshinori Honda is a strong insei and one of the five forerunners (which include Hikaru, Ochi, Waya, Isumi, and Honda). He almost makes the top three players in the professional exam, even managing to beat Hikaru, but ultimately fails. He eventually became a Professional along with Isumi and Kadowaki the next year, barely scraping with six losses.

=== Tatsuhiko Kadowaki ===
Tatsuhiko Kadowaki (門脇龍彦, Kadowaki Tatsuhiko)
Voiced by: Akimitsu Takase

Kadowaki is a cocky player who initially applied to be an insei before Sai plays for Hikaru and easily beats him. Kadowaki thus decides to train for another year. The next year he passes with a near perfect score, losing only to Isumi.

=== Yuta Fukui ===
Yuta Fukui (福井 雄太, Fukui Yūta)
Voiced by: Wasabi Mizuta (Japanese); Nathan Tipple (English)

Nicknamed "Fuku" (フク), an Insei and classmate of Waya who is known for his extremely fast-paced style of play. Although Waya is the stronger player, he cannot seem to defeat Fuku. Hikaru loses one game to him during the pro exam, but Fukui ultimately fails the exam.

=== Asumi Nase ===
Asumi Nase (奈瀬 明日美, Nase Asumi)
Voiced by: Atsuko Enomoto (Japanese); Alexandra Carter (English)

The only female Insei that has a prominent role in the series. She is able to defeat Honda in the pro exams, but ultimately fails the exam.

=== Toshiki Adachi ===
Toshiki Adachi (足立俊輝, Adachi Toshiki)
Voiced by: Takuo Kawamura (Japanese); Trevor Devall (English)

One of the strongest insei, being able to beat Waya and advance in the Young Lion's Tournament. He eventually fails the pro exams.

=== Eiji Komiya ===
Eiji Komiya (小宮 英二, Komiya Eiji)
Voiced by: Tomoya Kawai (Japanese); Andy Toth (English)

One of the strongest insei. He eventually fails the pro exams.

=== Toshiro Tsubaki ===
Toshiro Tsubaki (椿俊郎, Tsubaki Toshirō)
Voiced by: Tomomichi Nishimura (Japanese); Michael Donovan (English)

Nicknamed "Gorilla Man", Tsubaki is a large, loud, hairy man who easily intimidates Hikaru. He fails the pro exams, and due to the age limit of 30 will never be able to retake it again, so he asks Hikaru to win in his place.

=== Kyohei Katagiri ===
Voiced by: Kōji Yusa (Japanese); Michael Donovan (English)

An insei who tries and fails to take down the forerunners, eventually failing the pro exams.

=== Ryo Iijma ===
Ryo Iijma (飯島良, Iijima Ryō)
Voiced by: Takayuki Yamaguchi (Japanese); Michael Adamthwaite (English)

Ryo Iijima was an insei who notices Hikaru's growth. Iijima was outraged when he learns from Waya that Waya's group helped Hikaru by taking him to Go salons, because Hikaru was the whole group's "competition" for obtaining the status of a Go professional. Iijima later decides to quit.

== Professional ==
=== Koyo Toya Meijin ===
Koyo Toya (塔矢 行洋, Tōya Kōyō)
Voiced by: Eizo Tsuda (Japanese); Paul Dobson (English)

Akira Toya's father and professional Go player, known as Toya Meijin (塔矢 名人, Tōya Meijin); Meijin being one of the titles he earned. He rivals Sai and like Sai he also pursues the divine move. Following his defeat by Sai he retires from the Japanese Go circuit and plays in China. He has an interest in Hikaru and requested to play him in the Beginner Dan series after Hikaru becomes a pro.

=== Kuwabara ===
Kuwabara Hon'inbo (桑原本因坊, Kuwabara Hon'inbō)
Voiced by: Rokuro Naya (Japanese); French Tinker (English)

An elderly professional and current holder of the Honinbo title. Kuwabara is friends with Toya Meijin, but rivals Ogata, whose challenge he defeats. In his title defence next year, he defeats the young fast-improving Kurata. He is able to vaguely sense Sai's presence, and develops an interest in Hikaru. Kuwabara bets on Hikaru in his Beginner Dan series game. Kuwabara was Shusaku's real family name. Voiced by: Rokurō Naya (Japanese); French Tickner (English)

=== Shigeo Morishita ===
Shigeo Morishita (森下 茂男, Morishita Shigeo)
Voiced by: Katsuhiro Kitagawa (Japanese); Richard Newman (English)

Also known as Morishita Sensei or Mr. Morishita, is a 9-dan pro who is Waya's go teacher and leader of the study group which Hikaru also frequents on Waya's invitation. He considers Koyo Toya a rival, since the two of them became pros at the same time. Morishita also mentors Michio Shirakawa (7-dan), the community Go leader.

=== Seiji Ogata ===
Seiji Ogata (緒方 精次, Ogata Seiji,; 10-dan)
Voiced by: Keiji Fujiwara (Japanese); Michael Adamthwaite (English)

A Go professional who recognizes Hikaru's talent when he comments on a Go move during a children's tournament that even professional Go players would take some time to see (although this is Sai's insight - Hikaru had not yet attained much skill by this time). He is also a student of Koyo Toya and soon takes the Judan and Gosei titles when Koyo Toya retires.

=== Shinoda ===
Shinoda (篠田, Shinoda)
Voiced by: Naoki Bandō (Japanese); John Murphy (English)

A Professional Go Player and the Insei Instructor for the Insei classes.

=== Zama Oza ===
Zama Oza (座間王座, Zama Ōza)
Voiced by: Keiji Fujiwara (Japanese); Michael Adamthwaite (English)

Zama is the current holder of the Oza title, a smug and condescending man. He played Akira Toya in the Shinshodan Series, and was angered by his precocious attitude, resolving to crush him. Akira dominates most of the match, but his excessive risk taking allows the Oza to turn the game in his favor.

=== Michio Shirakawa ===
Michio Shirakawa (白川七段, Shirakawa Michio)
Voiced by: Koji Yusa (Japanese); Ted Cole (English)

A 7-dan Go player and the community Go leader. He was mentored by Morishita. A member of Morishita's study group and a community go teacher.

=== Atsushi Kurata ===
Atsushi Kurata (倉田 厚, Kurata Atsushi)
Voiced by: Mitsuo Iwata (Japanese); Alistair Abell (English)

Atsushi Kurata is 7 Dan professional Go player. He met Hikaru when Hikaru point out an important historical significant Go board is a fake and when Kurata plays Hikaru at a Go salon in one color Go and recognizes Hikaru's potential. He later become the manager for Japan Team for the Hokuto Cup and let Hikaru play as Japan first against Korea First Ko Yongha.

== Kaio Middle School ==
=== Kaoru Kishimoto ===
Kaoru Kishimoto (岸本 薫, Kishimoto Kaoru)
Voiced by: Takahiro Sakurai (Japanese); Brent Miller (English)

Kaio Middle School Go club president and former Insei who did not become a professional. He played Akira in a game, and had to resign early and admitted he was outclassed and right not to pursue professional play. Later he plays a match against Hikaru to gauge his strength, and defeats him easily. His dismissive attitude to Hikaru's plan to rise to Akira's level while playing in the school club spurs Hikaru on to register as an Insei. His liking for black coffee allows Hikaru to realize that he is the failed Insei that the others are discussing shortly after Hikaru becomes an Insei.

=== Mr. Yun ===
Mr. Yun
Voiced by: Kazuaki Ito (Japanese); Brian Drummond (English)

Yun is Akira's Middle School teacher who is in charge of the school Go club. He is originally from Korea. He worked as a go instructor for children in Korea, and was initially disappointed in young Go players in Japan, until he joined the Kaio faculty.

=== Yuri Hidaka ===
Yuri Hidaka (日高 由梨, Hidaka Yuri)
Voiced by: Takako Honda (Japanese); Rebecca Shoichet (English)

A 3rd year Kaio Middle School student who stands up for Akira when he gets bullied by three other members of the Go club who resent his presence in the club. She hates bullying of all kinds, but this does not stop her from bullying others.

=== Ito, Kojima, and Okumura ===
Itō (伊藤, Itō), Kojima (小島), and Okumura (奥村)

Three students who dislike Akira Toya's presence in the Kaio Middle School Go club, and try to humiliate him into quitting the club by making him play "blind Go" (i.e. calling out the moves without looking at the Go board, like blindfold chess). Yuri Hidaka catches them in the act and puts a stop to the bullying.

== Other characters ==
=== Harumi Ichikawa ===
Harumi Ichikawa (市河 晴美, Ichikawa Harumi)
Voiced by: Satsuki Yukino (Japanese); Kelly Sheridan (English)

Ms. Ichikawa is the cashier of the Go salon owned by the Toyas. She feels saddened when Akira frequents the club less often because of his pro schedule, and refuses to start calling him "sensei" when he goes pro, preferring to keep calling him by the nickname "Akira-kun". She frequently drives him to different places and he sometimes tutors her in Go.

=== Shu ===
Shu (修, Shū)
Voiced by: Aruno Tahara (Japanese); Michael Dobson (English)

The owner of a Go salon where Hikaru finds Yuki Mitani. Shu recognises that Mitani is cheating, so he hires Dake-san to teach him a lesson.

=== Dake ===
Dake (だけ, Dake)

A Go hustler hired by Shu to teach Yuki Mitani not to cheat. He poses as a regular at the Go salon and hides his strength. He bets money on the game and wins 10,000 yen (about $110 US) from Yuki. Hikaru and Sai later win the money back, and Hikaru uses this to persuade him to join the school Go club. Dake sings romantic songs while playing Go as part of his act to appear like a harmless buffoon, and plays with his right hand (although he is left-handed) to appear clumsy.

=== Heihachi Shindo ===
Heihachi Shindo (進藤 平八, Shindō Heihachi)
Voiced by: Hiroshi Naka (Japanese); Scott McNeil (English)

Hikaru's grandfather, a regional Go champion, who owns the board where Hikaru first discovered Sai. He claims his brother bought the board in an antique shop, intrigued by the rumor that a "ghost in a tall hat" would appear from it sometimes. He keeps the board as a memento after his brother's death and refuses to give it to Hikaru, but after seeing how much Hikaru has improved in Go in one year's time, he buys him a nice Go board to practice on his own.

=== Mitani's Sister ===
Mitani's sister (三谷の姉, Mitani no Ane)
Voiced by: Maryke Hendrikse

A girl who works at an internet cafe and lets Hikaru play Go on the computers for free during her shifts. She also helps Hikaru with his English.

=== Mitsuko Shindo ===
Mitsuko Shindo (新堂 光子, Shindō Mitsuko)
Voiced by: Yurika Hino (Japanese); Cathy Weseluck (English)

Hikaru's mother.

== China ==
=== Yang Hai ===
Yang Hai (楊 海) (simplified Chinese: 杨 海; traditional Chinese: 楊 海; pinyin: Yáng Hǎi)

A Chinese Go professional who befriended Izumi during the latter's trip to China. He invited Isumi to stay over in his dorm room so Isumi wouldn't need to spend money on hotels. He is very interested in computer technology and involved in projects designed to teach computers how to play the Go. In addition to Mandarin Chinese, Yang can also speak Japanese, Korean and English. He is later chosen as the coach for team China during the Hokuto Cup.

=== Zhao Shi ===
Zhao Shi (趙 石) (赵 石; 趙 石; Zhào Shí)

A 14-year-old Chinese Go professional who represented China as the third board in the Hokuto Cup.

=== Le Ping ===
Le Ping (楽 平) (乐 平; 樂 平; Lè Píng)

A 13-year-old Chinese Go professional. Having turned pro at the age of 11, Le relocated from his hometown in Yunnan to Beijing to study at the Chinese Go Institute, but his skills had been stagnating as he was distracted by the life in a big city. Losing to Isumi prompted Le to work hard. In appearance, Le looked exactly like Waya.

== Korea ==
=== Suyong Hong ===
Hong Suyong (洪 秀英, Hon Suyon) (Korean: 홍 수영; RR: Hong Suyeong)
Voiced by: Miyako Itō (Japanese); Erika Lo (English)

A Korean Go professional, 2 years younger than Hikaru (12 years old). Hikaru, Waya, and Isumi travel to Go salons to sharpen their skills while they are Insei. In one of them they meet Suyong, whose uncle runs a Go salon, while Su-Yong is on vacation from Korea. At the time, Su-Yong is a Yeon'gusaeng (the Korean equivalent of an Insei), but is disillusioned with playing Go. Heated words between him and Hikaru lead to the two playing an intense, exciting match at the Go salon. Hikaru defeats Su-Yong and this spurs Su-Yong to work harder to become a pro. Su-Young becomes famous after beating a 9-dan in Korea. He appears again as the third representative for Korea in the Hokuto Cup.

=== Yongha Ko ===
Ko Yongha (高 永夏, Ko Yonha) (Korean: 고 영하; RR: Go Yeongha)

A professional Go player who is chosen to represent South Korea in the Hokuto Cup. He unintentionally caused a lot of tension between Team Japan and Team Korea surrounding the tournament, as a bad translation of his Korean words during an interview caused people in Japan to think he insulted Honinbo Shusaku.
