= Hon'inbō Shūho =

Japanese Go player

Personal information
- Native name: 本因坊秀甫 (Japanese)
- Full name: Murase Shūho
- Born: 1838 Japan
- Died: October 1886 (aged 47–48) Japan

Sport
- Teacher: Jōsaku and Shūwa
- Rank: 8 dan

Hon'inbō Shūho (本因坊 秀甫; 1838 – October 14, 1886), born as Murase Shūho (村瀬 秀甫), was a professional Japanese Go player who was an important figure in the popularization of the game. He was the first Japanese Go player to have a reputation in the Western world. At a time when he was thought to be the best player in Japan, he taught the game to chemist Oskar Korschelt, a visitor from Germany. Korschelt later was the first person to popularize Go to a notable degree in a non-Asian country. Shūho is also credited with the innovation of time limits being imposed on a game of Go.

== Biography ==
Shūho became a student in the Hon'inbō house at the age of seven, reaching 1-dan rank in 1848 at the age of 10. In 1861 when he was 23 he reached 6-dan. He was the strongest Hon'inbō disciple after Shūsaku, and Shūwa wanted to make him his heir when Shūsaku died, but Jōwa's widow blocked this plan.

In 1879 he founded the Hoensha institution with Nakagawa Kamesaburo. Hoensha would help to create a new revival of go via the publishing of the first magazine focused on Go called Igo Shinpo or Go News.

Shūho became the 18th Hon'inbō in 1886, inheriting the title from Hayashi Shuei.

Shūho published the famous book Hoen Shinpo in 1882, which outlined the Meiji era fuseki. After a rapprochement between the Hoensha and the Honinbo house in 1886, Shūei promoted Shūho to 8-dan and stepped aside to allow him to become head of the Hon'inbō house. Shūho died only three months after becoming Hon'inbō. In the last few years of his life he was the strongest player in Japan.

Preceded by Hon'inbō Shūei	Hon'inbō; 1886	Succeeded by Hon'inbō Shūei
