= Segoe Kensaku =

Japanese Go player

Personal information
- Native name: 瀬越憲作 (Japanese)
- Born: May 22, 1889 Japan
- Died: July 27, 1972 (aged 83)

Sport
- Pupil: Go Seigen; Utaro Hashimoto; Cho Hunhyun
- Rank: 9 dan

Segoe Kensaku (瀬越 憲作, Segoe Kensaku; May 22, 1889 – July 27, 1972) was a professional Go player. (His surname is occasionally given as Segoshi, but that appears to be a misreading, even if attested by furigana in some books he authored.)

== Biography ==
At a time when Japanese Go players were divided into rival groups, Segoe brought together the Honinbo and Houensha factions, founding the Nihon Ki-in in 1924. Promoted to 7th dan in 1926, he played a key role as the East team captain in the East-West Rivalry Match. Despite setbacks, including a ko dispute in 1928, Segoe was promoted to 8th dan in 1942. After WW2, Segoe helped rebuild the Nihon Ki-in, became its first chairman, and resumed the "Kido" magazine. He was promoted to honorary 9th dan in 1955 and awarded the Order of the Sacred Treasure in 1966.

Segoe had Go Seigen, Utaro Hashimoto, and Cho Hunhyun as pupils. He also authored numerous books, such as his Tesuji Dictionary (with Go Seigen) and Go proverbs Illustrated. An internal quarrel in the Nihon Ki-in led to his becoming an isolated, if very much respected, figure. His participation in competition post-1945 was quite low.

As his health deteriorated, he took his own life at the age of 83 in 1972, shortly after his pupil Cho Hun-hyun returned to South Korea for military service. He was inducted into the Go Hall of Fame in 2009.

Sporting positions
New title	Director of the Japan Go Association (Nihon Ki-in); 1946–1948	Succeeded by Kaoru Iwamoto
