= Hoensha =

Japanese Go organization

The Hoensha was a Japanese Go organization founded in 1879 by Honinbo Shuho. The Hoensha was the successor to study groups set up by Nakagawa Kamesaburo and other players. It was the major Go organization of the later Meiji period. Like the many Go organizations today, the Hoensha awarded professional grades. The Hoensha house magazine was Igo Shinpo. The Four Heavenly Kings of Hoensha were Kobayashi Tetsujiro, Mizutani Nuiji, Sakai Yasujiro, and Takahashi Kinesaburo. The Three Wunderkinder were Ishii Senji, Sugioka Eijiro, and Tamura Yasuhisa (Honinbo Shusai). When Nihon Ki-in was established, the Hoensha was dissolved in 1924.

President	Years Run
Honinbo Shuho	1876–1886
Nakagawa Kamesaburo	1886–1899
Iwasaki Kenzo	1899–1912
Nakagawa Kamesaburo	1912–1920
Hirose Heijiro	1920–1924
Iwasa Kei	1924

== See also ==
- Kansai Ki-in
- Hanguk Kiwon (Korean Go Association)
- Zhongguo Qiyuan (Chinese Go Association)
- Taiwan Chi-Yuan (Taiwanese Go Association)
- American Go Association
- European Go Federation
