= Go opening =

Initial moves of a Go game

A Go opening is the initial stage of a game of Go. On the traditional 19×19 board the opening phase of the game usually lasts between 15 and 40 plies. There is some specialised terminology for go openings. The precise meanings of Japanese language terms are often misunderstood.

A go whole-board opening refers to an opening sequence of plays, almost always laid out the standard 19×19 go board. Because of the symmetry of the board (eight-fold), there are certain conventions about displaying opening moves traditional in Japan. These do not necessarily apply in China or Korea, but naturally in speaking of an 'opening' one never needs to distinguish openings related by symmetry.

The Japanese term for the opening phase of the game is joban, but this is not used in English. Instead it is very common to use fuseki, a Japanese term that has a literal meaning of 'scattering of stones'. This really refers, therefore, to the way the initial plays are distributed around the sides and corners. If the game begins just in one corner, which is rare for high-level play but more common with novices, this is not really fuseki. Also, fuseki may be commonly used as a description for the pattern adopted by Black, the first player, for example, for Black 1-3-5. This ignores White 2 and White 4, and so is really a name for a side formation (for example, Chinese opening) or perhaps a diagonal formation (for example, tasukiboshi, where Black 1 and Black 3 are at 4-4 points in the north-east and south-west corners). The Korean-language term equivalent to fuseki is poseok.

There are also go corner openings. There are many thousands of these standard variations known, related to developments in just one 10×10 corner of the board. In English, they are almost always called joseki; joseki is not a synonym of corner opening, but of standard sequence. The literal meaning in Japanese is of set (i.e., fixed or settled) stones. There are joseki in Go that do not relate to the corner openings. The Korean term equivalent to joseki is jeongseok, often transliterated jungsuk.

In Japanese the 10-10 point on the board (i.e. the center) is called tengen. An opening play at tengen is a kind of experimental opening, and has at times in history been controversial. It may lead to what is called mirror go, in Japanese manego, in which Black imitates White by playing diagonally opposite with respect to the centre stone. There is another style, also called mirror go, where from the beginning of the game White imitates Black in a diagonally-opposite way. The first kind was interesting, for strong players, before the introduction of komidashi, i.e. compensation points for second play. The second kind became interesting only after the introduction of komidashi. Go opening strategy is the strategy applied in Go opening.

There are some conventional divisions that are applied. Firstly there is the distinction that may be drawn between go opening theory, the codified variations that resemble chess openings in the way that they occur repeated in games, and go opening principles. Since there is great freedom of choice, the fundamental opening principles are more useful for all players before they reach dan player level.

== Basic principles ==
Examples of principles that are generally useful are comments such as 'corner-side-centre', which says that the corner areas of the board are more valuable than the sides (points near an edge but away from the corners). Occupying points in the centre may be good for early fighting, but these points are weaker from the aspect of developing one's territory.

== Developments over the last century ==
The opening strategy in Go can be said to have undergone some major changes in the twentieth century. Not only have new joseki been developed, but some important shifts in thinking have occurred. For example:

- from 1900 to 1930, the strategy was traditional, the so-called Shusaku style
- in 1933 and for a few years afterwards, a very different and experimental style called shinfuseki dominated professional go, at least for the younger players
- from around 1936, there was a compromise of styles, sugou fuseki, which mixed some of the more successful ideas from shinfuseki with older techniques for a more balanced approach, forming the basis of modern professional play
- the introduction of komidashi of 4.5 points in most top tournaments of the 1950s led to a tighter, territorial style for Black, for example in Sakata Eio, with greater use of the 3-3 point for White also.
- the Chinese opening dominated thinking from the early 1970s, and many further ideas were tried, for example the mini-chinese formation which is a side opening, rather than a corner opening or whole-board opening
- the entry of South Korean professionals into international competitions in the early 1990s saw the use of 'prepared variations' of whole-board openings, in a way not seen before.

== Contemporary ideas ==
Contemporary Go opening strategy is more complicated than the old corner opening/whole-board opening distinction suggests. The 4-4 point is used by professionals in about 70% of corners. Corner openings for the 4-4 point are still being developed, but it is more accurate to say that almost all contemporary opening theory is implicated in the patterns around the 4-4 point.

== Fuseki ==
The Japanese term fuseki is sometimes taken as synonymous with 'whole-board strategy'. More accurately, it means the 'scattering' or thin distribution of stones that occurs in the early part of the game. In the game of Go, opening theory is the strategy of where, why, in what order, and in what shapes the first several moves are played in Go opening. The middle game typically begins once the basic foundational areas called frameworks are established and "fighting" begins.

The opening is conceptually and traditionally divided for study into the sequences that are whole board openings and those that are corner openings. Each type constitutes a series of plays which have been studied for their balance (with the other) as well as for countermoves.

For a standard board, the most basic single concept for the opening is that plays in the corners are more efficient for making territory than plays on the sides or in the center.

Only a relatively small proportion of openings have a recognised name. These include the Three stars opening (sanrensei), Two stars opening (nirensei), "Pinwheel" or Shusaku opening and Chinese opening (Chinese fuseki). To be more precise, these are names for the moyo (framework) formations which Black makes on one side of the board. Since White has a choice of perhaps two dozen legitimate variations on the other side, these are in fact large complexes of openings.

The Chinese opening has an intricate history. According to several historical accounts (both Chinese and Japanese), it was actually first developed by Japanese players, but later was heavily researched and developed by Chinese players. It was very popular from about 1970 onwards, and has by Go standards a thoroughly-researched theory.

== Jōseki ==
Joseki are "sequences" of moves which have been

- played and documented in high-level play, and
- studied and deemed as consisting of optimal (balanced) moves for both sides.

Joseki is a Japanese word (定石) (Korean jeongseok), where jo (定) means "fixed" or "set", and seki (石) means stone(s). It thus literally means "set stones", as in "set pattern". Variations are shown to lead to different positional advantages and disadvantages for the two players in certain overall game situations. If Black and White both play the joseki correctly, they should achieve a balanced result within that particular corner; neither should have a large advantage, unless the opponent makes a mistake.

"Balance" typically refers to an equitable trade-off between securing territory in the corner versus making good thickness toward the sides and center. The assessment also takes into account who started and ended the corner sequence: if Black has played one more stone than White in the corner, for example, Black's result should be objectively better than White's, to reflect the extra investment of a play.

In application these concepts are in fact very dynamic, and often joseki are deviated from depending on the needs of the situation, and the opportunities available. While learning joseki is a tool to defend against a local loss, players can seek to take advantage by deviating from the joseki, or "pausing" it.

Usually joseki as a term (in literature in English) is applied to a set sequence happening in one corner in the opening stage. These sequences are not the only set sequences in the game, however. There are also joseki seen in the middle game: these include standard follow-ups to earlier joseki. Other examples are common techniques for invading or reducing frameworks. Learning to apply these so-called "middle game joseki" is one of the steps to becoming strong.

The current body made up of joseki is not fixed, but consists of patterns that have gained acceptance in professional games. That is, they form a consensus judgement that might change in the future, or with certain caveats.

Hence the basic definition may be misleading for new players in that joseki can be misconstrued as foolproof and unalterable, and are otherwise optimal for all situations. Some joseki are in fact useful only for study within an artificially confined corner, and in real play are only considered good form when used in proper combination with other plays on the board (i.e. other joseki and fuseki moves).

Knowing a particular joseki simply means that one knows a sequence of moves, resulting in a balance or fair trade-off between their positions. This is in practice much easier than appraising how joseki relate to the rest of the board—hence knowledge of joseki is regarded as shallow, when compared with the ability to integrate a strategy into a complex game landscape.

There is a go proverb that states that "learning joseki loses two stones in strength," meaning that rote learning of sequences is not advantageous. Rather learning from joseki should be a player's goal. Hence the study of joseki is regarded as a double-edged sword and useful only if learned not by rote but rather by understanding the principles behind each move.

Every joseki should be used as a specific tool that leaves the board in a particular shape. Just as using an improper tool in machinery can be devastating, choosing the wrong joseki can easily be worse than improvising one's own moves.

In his book A Way of Play for the 21st Century, Go Seigen compared choosing the proper joseki to choosing the proper medicine—pick the right one, and you feel better. Pick the wrong one and you die.(par.) Rui Naiwei similarly remarked that playing joseki is easy [but] choosing the right one [in a game] is hard.(par.)

A joseki may fall out of use for various reasons, some of which may often seem minor to the amateur player, and professionals may consider one variation suboptimal for a very specific reason.

There is no definitive guide to what is joseki; the situation with joseki dictionaries is similar to that of natural language dictionaries, in that some entries are obsolete and the listing is not likely to be complete. Studying joseki is only an important part of developing one's strength as a player at some levels; the study of life and death and middle-game fighting are considered to be more important.

== Concepts ==
Opening theory is less dominant in terms of study for those wanting to reach a good amateur level, than in chess or shogi. It is, however, an important component of Go knowledge, though there is no single, codified source for it.

The standard sequences for the joseki in many cases come to a definite end, after which both players should move elsewhere. In some cases a sharp local struggle breaks out, which neither player should neglect. For those cases, the result of the opening may develop out of a 10×10 corner area into the rest of the board. Analysis without taking into account what other stones are in place then becomes somewhat meaningless. The longest 'book' corner openings are about 50-ply.

Most corner openings do not have special or picturesque names. A few that do are known by Japanese names: the taisha, the nadare (avalanche), the Magic sword of Muramasa. These are among the most complex, and are contraindicated for novices.

== History ==
Go openings have been studied in depth for many centuries, and center upon concepts of finding balance with the opponent. Because black moves first, opening moves for black are based on the concept of exploiting that first-move advantage (along with sente) to gain influence (or strength) and thus establish areas of territory. There is no complete theory of go, simply because the number of possible variations makes any literal study impossible. Hence even the opening is subject to changes of fashion, and also some notable periods of innovation.

Certain professional players are known for their use of specific or innovative types of openings, and their ability to combine their use of those openings with other strengths in competitive play.

== The 10-10 point ==
Go Seigen played his third move (Black 5) on tengen, in a 1933 game against Honinbo Shusai, the top player of the time. Go lost the controversial four-month game, which was played over 14 sessions in a ryokan in Tokyo from 16 October 1933 to 19 January 1934.
