= Jōseki =

Studied sequences of moves in the game of go and shogi

A san san jōseki: Black gets secure territory in the corner, and White gets outside (center) influence. The result is deemed equal, thus the sequence is a jōseki.

In go and shōgi, a jōseki (kanji characters 定石 for go, 定跡 for shōgi) is a studied sequence of moves for which the result is considered balanced for both black and white sides.

== Go jōseki ==
In go, because games typically start with plays in the corners, go jōseki are usually about corner play as the players try to gain local advantages there in order to obtain a better overall position. Though less common, there are also jōseki for the middle game. In Japanese, jō (定) means "fixed" or "set" and seki (石) means stones, giving the literal meaning "set stones", as in "set pattern". In Chinese, the term for joseki is dìngshì (定式).

The concept of "balance", here, often refers to an equitable trade-off between securing territory in the corner versus making good thickness toward the sides and the center. In application, these concepts are very dynamic, and, often, deviations from a jōseki depend upon the needs of the situation and the available opportunities. While learning jōseki is a tool to defend against a local loss, players always seek to take advantage of weaknesses in the opponent's shapes, often deviating from the jōseki.

=== Using jōseki ===
Jōseki are not fixed but comprise patterns that have gained acceptance in professional games; they constitute a consensus that may change with certain caveats. Hence, the basic definition may be misleading for new players in that a jōseki can be misconstrued as foolproof and unalterable and as optimal for all situations. Many jōseki are in fact useful only for study within an artificially confined corner, and in real play are only considered good form when used in proper combination with other plays on the board (i.e. other jōseki and fuseki moves).

Knowing a particular jōseki simply means that one knows a sequence of moves, resulting in a balance or fair trade-off between black and white positions. This is in practice much easier than appraising how jōseki relate to the rest of the board – hence, knowledge of jōseki is regarded as shallow, when compared with the ability to integrate a strategy into a complex game landscape.

One go proverb states that "learning jōseki loses two stones in strength," which means that the rote learning of sequences is not advantageous; rather, learning from a jōseki should be a player's goal. Hence, the study of jōseki is regarded as a double-edged sword and useful only if learned by understanding the principles behind each move, instead of by rote. Every jōseki should be used as a specific tool that leaves the board in a particular shape.

Just as using an improper tool in machinery can be devastating, choosing the wrong jōseki can easily be worse than improvising one's own moves. In his book A Way of Play for the 21st Century, Go Seigen compared choosing the proper jōseki to choosing the proper medicine: "Pick the right one, and you feel better. Pick the wrong one, and you die." [par.] Rui Naiwei similarly remarked that "playing joseki is easy [but] choosing the right one [in a game] is hard." [par.]

A jōseki may fall out of use for various reasons, some of which may often seem minor to the amateur player; professionals may consider one variation suboptimal for a very specific reason – one which strong amateurs are not likely to exploit. There is no definitive guide to what is a jōseki; the situation with jōseki dictionaries is similar to that of natural language dictionaries: some entries are obsolete, and the list is likely to be incomplete.

=== Basic jōseki ===
Corner jōseki conventionally start with one player occupying a corner point, in an empty 19×19 area of the board, and the other player replying with an approach move (Japanese: kakari). The initial play in the corner is almost always on a 3-3, 3-4, 3-5, 4-4 or 4-5 point. Other plays that have been experimented with include 5-5, 6-3 and 6-4, all of which sacrifice territory for influence.

Of those plays, the classical 3-4 point (komoku) and more contemporary 4-4 point (hoshi) are the most used. The standard approaches are at 5-3 or 5-4 to the 3-4 point, and at 3-6/6-3 to the 4-4 point. The number of subsequent variations is then quite large (of the order of ten reasonable plays for the next one). Recently, some 3-3 invasion josekis became popular after it was used successfully by the AlphaGo series of models, such as the flying knife joseki.

A Go game opening with two common jōseki in the upper-right and lower-left.

Breaking away from a sequence to play elsewhere (tenuki) before the conventional endpoint of the jōseki is not uncommon in higher level play. There is no formal theory for follow-up plays after jōseki, though numerous set sequences can be seen in professional play.

It is imperative that players should not play a jōseki merely from rote memorization but adapt according to the overall board situation. It is important to keep in mind that go is a game involving marginal analysis and jōseki are merely heuristics of sound play. Playing jōseki blindly will not improve one's game.

== Jōseki in shogi ==
In shogi, typically the beginning of the games (序盤 joban) consists of a number of relatively fixed series of moves for both players. This standard sequence of moves or a jōseki (spelled 定跡, unlike in go where they are spelled 定石) refers to especially recommended sequences of moves for a given opening that lead to a balanced play for both sides. These sequences of moves are considered to be the best for a particular opening from the start of the game to the start of a full-scale battle, and are often recommended to amateur players to be able to master basic strategy. Jōsekis are typically developed by professional players as a result of their individual research and actual games. Jōsekis change continuously, some even becoming obsolete when they are reevaluated to no longer end up in a balanced play.

Examples of jōsekis in shogi include the Saginomiya joseki, the Kimura joseki, and the Yamada joseki.

== See also ==
- Go opening theory
- Fuseki
- Avalanche joseki
- Taisha joseki
- Shogi opening
