= Blood-vomiting game =

1835 game of Go

The blood-vomiting game (Japanese: 吐血の一局, romanized: toketsu no ikkyoku) is a famous game of Go of the Edo period of Japan, played on June 27, 1835, between Hon'inbō Jōwa (white) and Akaboshi Intetsu (black). It is noted for the premature death of the Go prodigy Akaboshi Intetsu who coughed up blood after the game and died a few months later. Selected moves of the game are shown in diagrams.

After continually struggling to gain the post of Meijin, Hon'inbō Jōwa had won the title over rival Inoue Gennan Inseki. The rivalry between Jōwa and Inseki began when a game scheduled between the two was cancelled. The game, scheduled for February 18, 1828, was to be played due to Inseki's recent promotion to 8 dan. The game was cancelled by Jōwa's side, who claimed that Inseki did not deserve his promotion but had gained it through intrigue. This led Inseki to attempt to remove Jōwa from his post. Failing to keep to an agreement, Jōwa refused to give up his post to Inseki after six years (1834). Inseki then sent his pupil, Akaboshi Intetsu, expected to become Meijin after Jōwa, to play Jōwa in a match. The match lasted for four days without any adjournments. Jōwa won the match, and while kneeling over the board Akaboshi coughed or vomited up blood. He died within a few months. As Akaboshi was only 25 years old at the time, it is often suggested that pre-existing gastrointestinal bleeding or pulmonary disease had weakened his health, and it is possible that Akaboshi was sick for months with these diseases already.

== The game ==
=== The secret Inoue house move ===
The secret move used by Akaboshi in the match was developed by Gennan Inseki and others in the Inoue house as a taisha variation. The move, shown in the diagram, gave Akaboshi a lead by attacking the white stones in the center and being able to capture two stones later on in the game.

The secret move

=== Jōwa's Three Myoshu (三妙手) ===
Jōwa played three brilliant moves, or myoshu (Japanese: 妙手) in the game, eventually leading to Jōwa winning by resignation.

The first two brilliant moves, white 2 and 4 in the diagram below, allowed white to ignore black's move at 1 in order to play another move at 6 due to the aji of "a".

The first two myoshu

The third brilliant move was an example of bad shape but good move. Although forming an empty triangle shape is normally avoided because it is inefficient, the move allowed Jōwa to launch a splitting attack that would lead to his victory.

The third and last myoshu

=== End of the game ===
The end position. The brilliant moves are marked in order.
