= Mirror Go =

Opening strategy in the board game Go

A mirrored game of Go. After the first move, black plays a rotated version of white's move. White is able to surround and capture a section of black's pieces, breaking the symmetry.

Mirror Go is an opening strategy in the board game Go. In Mirror Go, one player plays moves that are diagonally opposite those of this opponent, making positions that have a rotational symmetry through 180° about the central 10-10 point (tengen in Japanese). The Japanese term for Mirror Go is manego.

== Variations ==
There are two types of strategy of this kind, and several ways the symmetry can or should be broken for tactical or strategic reasons.

- If Black plays Mirror Go, Black will generally open by placing a stone at the tengen point which cannot be mirrored, then imitate White subsequently. Black hopes that the possession of the central point will give an edge in an otherwise symmetrical position. This is only a potentially valid strategy if the game is played without komidashi compensation points given to White, as if White plays passively and arranges a 50/50 split of the board, Black will lose on komi. In games without komi, White will have to exploit a weakness of Mirror Go to win.
- If White plays Mirror Go, White imitates Black from the start. In games with komidashi, this can potentially be more valid, putting the onus on Black to gain an advantage. Black can eventually occupy the central point, which will also force White to stop mirroring.

Usually, this is only an opening strategy. If the mirroring player plays robotically as an entire-game strategy, as in the first example image, there are a number of tricks that can render Black's tengen stone useless or make it outright counterproductive by making it deny a crucial liberty to Black's group. When Mirror Go is used by serious players, they will eventually break Mirror Go if they see what they consider a strange move that only makes sense as an attempt to trick the mirroring player into a suboptimal play themselves.

=== Sample games ===
A placid game of Mirror Go initiated by Black

A game of Mirror Go initiated by White

In the example of Mirror Go by Black, one of the players has made a catastrophic error depending on if there is komi in the game: Black is sure to lose if there is komi (and should have broken off playing Mirror Go), but White might lose without it, depending on if area scoring or territory scoring is used. In the example of Mirror Go initiated by White, Black realizes what is going on and starts building two ladders that connect at the center point. If played to completion, then Black's eventual play on the center point will capture White's group and win the resulting capturing race. White should stop mirroring and play elsewhere for the 4th stone.

== Refutations ==
Mirror Go is generally considered a flawed strategy. While easy for a new player to learn, it may be refuted in a number of ways: using ladder tactics, using ko fights, or most convincingly for a novice by using contact plays to demonstrate that possession of the central point can just as well lead to a shortage of liberties.

Mirror Go can be refuted in boards of odd size more easily than those of even size. This is possibly one reason why odd sizes are always used. (On even-sized boards, ladders and kos can still be used.)

== Famous games ==
According to a legend, the 16th century Japanese daimyo Toyotomi Hideyoshi won a game of Go against Honinbo Sansa, the greatest player of his day, using the mirroring strategy. The strategy is sometimes called "Taikō Go" in Japanese as a result (taikō being the title Toyotomi took for himself late in his life after having unified much of the Japanese islands). The historical Toyotomi was already a strong Go player, however, so the claim in some versions of the legend of the strategy allowing a talented novice to win should be taken with some skepticism, even if Toyotomi did win such a game using the strategy.

After sporadic use down the years, Mirror Go was brought back into some fashion by the shinfuseki period of the 1930s, in which the opening of placing on the tengen square was seriously explored. Go Seigen played a game of Mirror Go as Black against Minoru Kitani in 1929, breaking mirroring only on the 63rd move. Kitani won the game, however, and defeated the mirror tactic. Fujisawa Kuranosuke was one of the more prominent and frequent users of the strategy and used it often as White, aiming for large-scale battles. He also had a reputation of getting into trouble with time management, and perhaps hoped that mirroring the early game would alleviate that. The example of Mirror Go as White above is loosely adapted from a famous game Fujisawa played against Masao Sugiuchi where the ladders nearly played to their completion before Fujisawa broke off mirroring; Masao won the game.

The 2001 anime series Hikaru no Go episode 8 ("Rainy Day Strategy") featured a weak player, deciding he was outmatched if he played normally, attempting Mirror Go tactics against the show's protagonist Akira Toya; Toya rebuffed it using the contact play strategy.

In a 2008 tournament game, Song Tae-kon, playing as White, played Mirror Go until the 42nd move against Piao Wenyao. Wenyao won the game.
