= Nadare jōseki =

Opening move sequence for a game of Go

Nadare jōseki

Black move at 'a' leads to the small avalanche (konadare) and at 'b' to the large avalanche (onadare).

The Nadare Jōseki (雪崩定石, nadare jōseki; "avalanche jōseki") is one of the most celebrated jōseki in the opening stage game of Go, and the one that has been most deeply studied in modern times. Hundreds of unique variations have appeared in high-level games. Aside from the taisha joseki, which has traditionally been said to have more than 1000 known variations, the avalanche is thought to be the most complex joseki; but the nadare fits much better with current ideas on opening strategy and is often used, while the taisha has been quite unfashionable for a generation as the 5-3 corner opening has gone out of favor.

== Sequence of moves ==
The avalanche occurs after the moves 1 (3–4), 2 (5–4), 3 (5–3), and 4 (4–4). The moves 5 (4–3) and 6 (3–5) then always follow (image at right). There is then a five-way choice for the next play. Point a (6–4) leads to the small avalanche (konadare) and b (6–3) to the large avalanche (onadare).

== Origins ==
Most go openings emerge from casual games into prominence when they appear in a high-profile match, but the origins of the avalanche joseki in professional play can be fairly accurately traced. In games from 1927, three years after the founding of the Nihon Ki-in, Kitani Minoru, then aged 18, began experimenting with it after one of his opponents used it against him.

Kitani was a leading figure in the development of the New Fuseki that revolutionized Japanese go in the 1930s, and one can see in the "avalanche" early evidence of his interest in the importance of central influence.

== Reasons for previous neglect ==
This opening was not previously used because it violates a principle that governs generally sound play. After Black 3, White 4 brings to mind the well-known go proverb, "hane (bend) at the head of two stones". In accordance with this proverb, White should play b — however, depending on the situation elsewhere on the board, White 6 may be not only playable, but preferable.

== Variations within the nadare ==
The onadare is the most complex line of all: the konadare can lead to a running fight, but tends normally to force the issue into settled formations. A new move found by Go Seigen in 1957, in a Saikyo Tournament game against Takagawa Kaku, is probably the most famous joseki innovation since the 'secret weapon' plays in the taisha of the early nineteenth century. It set off the modern intensive research in this joseki. It allows the first player to take the corner territory, and usually leads to a complex large-scale fight in the centre.
