= Kobayashi opening =

Kobayashi fuseki is a fuseki for Black stones in the game of Go. Its name comes from Kobayashi Koichi, who has very often used this fuseki.

Kobayashi fuseki is as below. It is similar to the mini Chinese fuseki. It emphasizes influence in order to shape out a big Moyo.

Kobayashi fuseki (Black)
