= Shusaku opening =

Opening pattern in the game of Go

The Shusaku opening, or Shusaku fuseki (秀策流布石), is a famous traditional fuseki for black stones in the game of Go. It was developed to perfection (but not invented) by Honinbo Shusaku and passed down to the Meiji, Taishō, and Shōwa eras.

With its variants, it constituted the basis of the major theories of fuseki for nearly a century, until the 1930s, at which point the introduction of komidashi and major innovations under the shinfuseki opening occurred. However, as a testimony to its effectiveness, this type of opening is still played by professionals when playing without a komi handicap.

The orthodox Shusaku fuseki is as follows:

Go board, 19 by 19. Moves: 1 black R16; 2 white D17; 3 black Q3; 4 white P17; 5 black C4; 6 white R5; 7 black Q15.2417653
Shusaku (black) vs. Ōta Yūzo (white), 1853

Move 7 is Shusaku's famous kosumi, which, Shusaku said, would not be a bad move no matter how Go theories develop.

The opening was displayed in a Google doodle on 6 June 2014 – the 185th anniversary of Honinbo Shusaku's birth.
