= Ear-reddening game =

1846 game of Go in Japan

Kifu of the whole match

The ear-reddening game (Japanese: 耳赤の一局, Hepburn: mimiaka no ikkyoku) is a game of go of the Edo period of Japan, played on September 11, 1846, between Honinbo Shusaku (black) and Inoue Genan Inseki (white). The game is probably Shusaku's most notable game as it contains the "ear-reddening move"—so named when a doctor who had been watching the game took note of Genan as his ears flushed red when Shusaku played the move, indicating he had become upset.

Shusaku met Genan Inseki in July 1846 when he returned to Edo after staying in Onomichi for eighteen months. Shusaku was 17 years old and a 4-dan player at the time, while Genan was nearing his fifties and was ranked at 8-dan. The first game they played, Genan allowed Shusaku to play with a two stone handicap. Realizing he had no chance of winning, Genan suspended the game without finishing it, and played another one with Shusaku simply playing black without handicap.

Shusaku made a mistake early on in the taisha joseki, but would play well throughout the rest of the game to win by 2 points.

== Taisha joseki ==
The first time this joseki was documented was 24 years earlier, in 1822, and at this time go sequences which were developed were held as trade secrets. Play progressed into the taisha five-way junction, with Shusaku making what is now regarded as a mistake on move 25 (he should have slid to the marked point).

Taisha joseki

== Ear-reddening move ==
Shusaku's move, marked Black 1 in the illustration, had influence in four directions simultaneously. While expanding the Black area at the top, it also brought help to the four triangled black stones on the bottom, reduced White's thickness on the right side, and aimed at erasing or invading white's position on the left side.

The ear-reddening move

== See also ==
- List of go games
