= Empty triangle =

Shape in the game of Go

Empty triangle shape
Go board, 9 by 9. Black stones: D7, E7, F7, C4, G4, C3, D3, H3. Marks: circle at D8; circle at E8; circle at F8; circle at C7; circle at G7; circle at D6; circle at E6; circle at F6; circle at C5; circle at B4; triangle on black stone at C4; X at D4; letter B at H4; circle at B3; triangle on black stone at C3; triangle on black stone at D3; circle at E3; letter A at G3; circle at C2; circle at D2.△XB△△A
- 8 liberties in a 3-stone string
- X takes up two liberties, leaving 7
- Connecting at "a" or "b" is inefficient.

In the game of Go, the empty triangle is the most fundamental example of the concept of bad shape.

Three stones of one color form an empty triangle when they are placed in a triangle arrangement that fits in a 2×2 square, and when one intersection is left empty. If the triangle is filled by a stone of the opponent's at the fourth point of the 2×2, the shape is neutral – not necessarily good or bad.

The deficiencies of the empty triangle are twofold. Three stones in a straight line have eight liberties, while in an empty triangle they have only seven. This can mean the difference between success and failure in a life-and-death struggle. Also the formation lacks efficiency. In the case cited, the diagonally adjacent stones are tactically connected without the third stone, since the opponent can't prevent them from connecting unless they are ignored for a turn.

However even though the empty triangle is a prime example of bad shape, creating one could make sense, or even qualify as brilliant, in certain situations. An example of this is the third "ghost move" in the famous blood-vomiting game. The move was played by Hon'inbō Jōwa as white against Akaboshi Intetsu. The move allowed Jowa to launch a splitting attack that would ultimately lead to his victory.

The Empty Triangle is also the name of a popular series of comic panels about the game of Go that features personalities from the KGS Go Server.

== See also ==
- International Go Federation
