= Akaboshi Intetsu =

Japanese Go player (1810–1835)

Personal information
- Native name: 赤星 因徹 (Japanese)
- Full name: Akaboshi Intetsu
- Born: 1810 Kikuchi, Japan
- Died: October 19, 1835 Unknown, Japan

Sport
- Teacher: Inoue Genan Inseki
- Rank: 7 dan

Akaboshi Intetsu (赤星 因徹; 1810 – October 19, 1835) was a Japanese professional 7 dan Go player.

== Biography ==
Born 1810, Akaboshi rose to prominence as a student of Inoue Genan Inseki, head of the House of Inoue. By 1834, the former had attained the rank of 7 dan.

Genan sought the prestigious position of the Meijin godokoro, but was unsuccessful as a result of political manoeuvres by Honinbo Jowa. Instead, the title and office were obtained by Jowa with the aid of Hayashi Gembi, an ally within the government. In response, Genan sought to use Akaboshi, his prodigy, in an attempt to embarrass Jowa into retirement.

The "Blood-vomiting game" was played between Akaboshi, 7 dan as black, and Jowa, 9 dan as white. It took place at the Matsudaira Go Party from 13–21 August 1835. Black succeeded in building an early lead, utilising one of House Inoue's secret taisha joseki. However, Jowa played a sequence of three acclaimed tesuji that turned the tide of the match in his favour, ultimately leading to black's resignation after 246 moves. According to Invincible, Akaboshi's health was already in decline when the game began, but after it had ended he coughed up blood over the board and collapsed.

On 19 October 1835, Akaboshi died of tuberculosis.

== Publications ==
Akaboshi authored the Genran, a collection of tsumego, published in 1833. It features a total of 69 problems, with the first turn alternating between black and white.
