= Jigo =

Jigo may refer to:

- Jigo (Go), a tied score in the game of Go
- A character in Princess Mononoke
- Jigō, a name in common use for Buddhist temples in Japan
