= Manego =

Manego may refer to:

- Manego, the Japanese term for Mirror Go
- Manego (album), an album by Yves Larock
