= Left Silver-57 Rapid Attack =

Left Silver-57 Rapid Attack
☖ pieces in hand: –

9	8	7	6	5	4	3	2	1
									1
									2
									3
									4
							歩		5
歩		歩		歩		歩			6
	歩		歩	銀	歩			歩	7
	角	玉	金	金	銀		飛		8
香	桂						桂	香	9

☗ pieces in hand: –

Left Silver-57 Rapid Attack or Left Silver-5g Rapid Attack or Left Silver-5g Quick Attack (5七銀左急戦 go-nana gin hidari kyuusen) is a fast attacking strategy in shogi used with several different Static Rook openings often played by Black against Ranging Rook positions played by White. It is characterized by moving the left silver from its start position on 79 to the 57 square.

The Static Rook position is usually combined with a Boat castle.

== Against Fourth File Rook ==
When Left Silver-57 Rapid Attack is used against a Fourth File Rook opponent, Left Silver-57 Rapid Attack often transitions to the Left Silver-46 (4六銀左 yon-roku gin hidari) class of openings.

The Left Silver-57 Rapid Attack openings against Fourth File Rook include the Yamada joseki (山田定跡), the Saginomiya joseki (鷺宮定跡), and Pawn-45 Early Fight or Pawn-45 Rapid Engage (4五歩早仕掛け yon-go fu haya-shikake) among others.

First moves
☖ pieces in hand: –

9	8	7	6	5	4	3	2	1
香	桂	銀	金	王	金	銀	桂	香	1
	飛						角		2
歩	歩	歩	歩	歩			歩	歩	3
					歩	歩			4
									5
		歩					歩		6
歩	歩		歩	歩	歩	歩		歩	7
	角						飛		8
香	桂	銀	金	玉	金	銀	桂	香	9

☗ pieces in hand: –

The opening starts by the usual Static Rook vs Ranging Rook four-move sequence that results in the board position shown on the right. (See: Traditional Ranging Rook.)

=== Development ===
After the fourth move, the position can proceed in a number of different ways. The subsequent moves can be categorized with the following components:

- Black advancing on the second file and bishop defense response
- castle construction on both sides
- edge pawn development
- Black's left silver oblique advancement

These components can be used in different orders and even with some interleaving between them. Additionally, there may also be some strategic keeping the true intentions behind each player's moves uncertain in the hopes that an opponent will not respond with adequate defensive measures.

Black's Boat castle
☖ pieces in hand: –

9	8	7	6	5	4	3	2	1
									1
									2
									3
									4
									5
歩		歩		歩					6
	歩		歩						7
	角	玉		金					8
香	桂	銀	金						9

☗ pieces in hand: –
White's Mino castle
☖ pieces in hand: –

9	8	7	6	5	4	3	2	1
香	桂		金						1
	王	銀		金					2
	歩	歩	歩	歩					3
歩									4
									5
									6
									7
									8
									9

☗ pieces in hand: –

If Black is truly going for a rapid attack, then they will build a Boat castle since that can be created with relatively few moves. Black later may have an option on converting the Boat castle in the stronger Static Rook Anaguma or Left Mino and possibly further into the Left Silver Crown. White often builds either a Mino castle or an Ranging Rook Anaguma.

Odd pawn on files 3, 5, 7
☖ pieces in hand: –

9	8	7	6	5	4	3	2	1
									1
									2
									3
									4
									5
		歩		歩		歩			6
歩	歩		歩		歩		歩	歩	7
	角						飛		8
香	桂	銀	金	玉	金	銀	桂	香	9

☗ pieces in hand: –
Odd pawns
☖ pieces in hand: –

9	8	7	6	5	4	3	2	1
									1
									2
									3
									4
							歩		5
歩		歩		歩		歩		歩	6
	歩		歩	銀	歩				7
	角	玉	金	金	銀		飛		8
香	桂						桂	香	9

☗ pieces in hand: –

There is a shogi aphorism (将棋の格言 shōgi no kakugen) relevant to Static Rook vs Ranging Rook strategies such as Left Silver-57 Rapid Attack: 序盤は奇数の歩を突け joban wa kisuu no fu o tsuke "In the opening, push the odd-numbered pawns." This refers especially to the seventh, fifth, and third files pawns, which must be advanced in order to form a Left Silver-57 Rapid Attack structure. Advancing the odd pawns activates Black's bishop and allows the silvers to pass through the line of pawns. A possible position implied by the pushing all odd pawns is shown to the right.

For the next move, Black will usually either advance their right silver (3. S-48) or their rook pawn (3. P-25). The silver-48 development is the more common move in out of all professional games (occurring about 70% of the time). However, out of the games that actually lead to a Left Silver-57 Rapid Attack position, the pawn push is more common. Although other moves such as 3. K-68 are logically possible, these are uncommon.

==== Rook pawn push ====
Rook pawn
☖ pieces in hand: –

9	8	7	6	5	4	3	2	1
香	桂	銀	金	王	金	銀	桂	香	1
	飛								2
歩	歩	歩	歩	歩		角	歩	歩	3
					歩	歩			4
							歩		5
		歩							6
歩	歩		歩	歩	歩	歩		歩	7
	角						飛		8
香	桂	銀	金	玉	金	銀	桂	香	9

☗ pieces in hand: –
3. P-25 B-33

3. P-25. Advancing Black's rook pawn one rank further has two purposes. The first is that the pawn is closer to White's camp and ready to attack later in the game. (It may also be possible to exchange the pawns later in order to get a pawn in hand. However, White will prevent this from happening immediately by protecting the 44 square with another piece.) The second purpose is that it enlarges the area that the rook can move to. For example, the rook can now move up to the sixth rank where it can be used either defensively or offensively.

Note the Black need not advance the rook pawn this early at move 5. They may, for instance, move their right silver (3. S-48).

3...B-33. White must respond to Black's pawn push in order to protect the second file. Since White is playing Ranging Rook, they will move their bishop to the third file protecting the 24 square. This move prevents Black from immediately exchanging pawns on the second file and obtaining a pawn in hand. It also opens up the White's entire b rank allowing for the possibility of White moving the rook to 22 for an Opposing Rook strategy.

==== Silver development ====
Right silver
☖ pieces in hand: –

9	8	7	6	5	4	3	2	1
香	桂	銀	金	王	金	銀	桂	香	1
	飛								2
歩	歩	歩	歩	歩		角	歩	歩	3
					歩	歩			4
							歩		5
		歩							6
歩	歩		歩	歩	歩	歩		歩	7
	角				銀		飛		8
香	桂	銀	金	玉	金		桂	香	9

☗ pieces in hand: –
4. S-48

4. S-48. This move prepares for White's Ranging Rook as well as numerous other strategies (such as Double Fortress). If White moves their rook to the fourth file and advances their fourth file pawn very early, then Black's silver can advance to 57 protecting the 46 square from the pawn attack. This silver if left on 48 also defends the 37 square from White advancing their third file pawn later in the game (which is when Black might have their knight positioned on 37).

Development of the right silver to the fourth file is the most common fifth move in professional games following the board position after the first four moves. The reason is that is more flexible than the 3. P-25 pawn push. Although S-48 can lead to the Left Silver-57 Rapid Attack strategy discussed here, this silver can also be used for Black's Right Fourth File Rook strategy (with a Reclining Silver formation), in which a P-25 pawn push is undesirable as it blocks Black's knight from advancing to 25. This flexibility of 3. S-48 also informs White less about Black's strategy compared to 3. P-25 which narrows the possibilities of Black and thus is more informative to White.

Although it's possible for Black to move the silver to the third file (S-38) possibly in preparation for a Climbing Silver strategy in which the silver advances up the second file, this move is not found in professional games since the silver's position is more limited and further away from White's king once it has been castled (which will likely be on files 7–9) as well as further away from focal point of the fourth file where White's rook is positioned. Moreover, a Climbing Silver strategy can still be used even with the silver moving up from 48. And, finally, as S-38 does give White a strong indication of Climbing Silver, it is more revealing to White what Black's strategy will be and thus White can prepare defensively.

==== Ranging the rook ====
Rook ranged
☖ pieces in hand: –

9	8	7	6	5	4	3	2	1
香	桂	銀	金	王	金	銀	桂	香	1
					飛				2
歩	歩	歩	歩	歩		角	歩	歩	3
					歩	歩			4
							歩		5
		歩							6
歩	歩		歩	歩	歩	歩		歩	7
	角				銀		飛		8
香	桂	銀	金	玉	金		桂	香	9

☗ pieces in hand: –
4...R-42
Pawn response
☖ pieces in hand: –

9	8	7	6	5	4	3	2	1
香	桂	銀	金	王	金	銀	桂	香	1
					飛				2
歩	歩	歩	歩	歩		角	歩	歩	3
					歩	歩			4
							歩		5
		歩		歩					6
歩	歩		歩		歩	歩		歩	7
	角				銀		飛		8
香	桂	銀	金	玉	金		桂	香	9

☗ pieces in hand: –
5. P-56

4. ...R-42. This move announces that White is playing Fourth File Rook. It protects the fourth file as well as allowing the king the possibility to start castling in their next move.

It is possible to delay moving the rook for the sixth move and instead move White's left silver (...S-32). A benefit of the delay is that it keeps White's strategy more uncertain as ...S-32 is also compatible with a Fortress opening. Demerits of delaying the rook movement include delaying of castle formation, blocking the rook from moving to the second or third files if desired, and preventing White from doing any early fourth file pawn (counter-)attack.

5. P-56.

==== Edge pawns ====
Edge pawns
☖ pieces in hand: –

9	8	7	6	5	4	3	2	1
香	桂	銀	金	王	金	銀	桂	香	1
					飛				2
	歩	歩	歩	歩		角	歩	歩	3
歩					歩	歩			4
							歩		5
歩		歩		歩					6
	歩		歩		歩	歩		歩	7
	角				銀		飛		8
香	桂	銀	金	玉	金		桂	香	9

☗ pieces in hand: –
5... P-94
6. P-96

5...P-94. Early edge pawn. This move is an important development of White's future Mino castle since it creates an opening in the line of pawns from which White's king can escape if needed during the end game. However, pushing the edge pawn does restrict White's castle options since an Anaguma castle does not have this advanced edge pawn. Thus, the edge pawn gives Black an indication of White's castle strategy.

A second goal of White's early edge pawn is to try to determine Black's intentions by seeing if Black responds to White's edge pawn by likewise pushing their edge pawn forward. If Black is planning an Anaguma castle, then the edge pawn won't be pushed forward, but if the edge pawn push is mirrored, then Black may be planning a Left Silver-57 Rapid Attack strategy instead. This is valuable information for White as Static Rook Anaguma strategies can be difficult positions for Fourth File Rook players to overcome if their attack is not early enough. Thus, if Black suggests that they might play an Anaguma position, then White can start preparing for a Fujii System counterattack. If Black doesn't advance their edge pawn, then White can push their pawn further (6...P-95).

6. P-96. Black advances their edge pawn as well giving up the opportunity for an Anaguma castle.

==== Castling ====
Castling
☖ pieces in hand: –

9	8	7	6	5	4	3	2	1
香	桂		金	王	金	銀	桂	香	1
		銀			飛				2
	歩	歩	歩	歩		角	歩	歩	3
歩					歩	歩			4
							歩		5
歩		歩		歩					6
	歩		歩		歩	歩		歩	7
	角		玉		銀		飛		8
香	桂	銀	金		金		桂	香	9

☗ pieces in hand: –
6. ...S-72
7. K-68
Silver Preparation
☖ pieces in hand: –

9	8	7	6	5	4	3	2	1
香	桂		金	玉	金		桂	香	1
		銀			飛	銀			2
	歩	歩	歩	歩		角	歩	歩	3
歩					歩	歩			4
							歩		5
歩		歩		歩					6
	歩		歩		歩	歩		歩	7
	角		玉		銀		飛		8
香	桂	銀	金		金		桂	香	9

☗ pieces in hand: –
7. ...S-32

6. ...S-72. White constructs an Incomplete Mino castle, which the king can be moved into in later moves.

Castling
☖ pieces in hand: –

9	8	7	6	5	4	3	2	1
香	桂		金		金		桂	香	1
		銀	玉		飛	銀			2
	歩	歩	歩	歩		角	歩	歩	3
歩					歩	歩			4
							歩		5
歩		歩		歩					6
	歩		歩		歩	歩		歩	7
	角	玉			銀		飛		8
香	桂	銀	金		金		桂	香	9

☗ pieces in hand: –
8. K-78 K-62
Castling
☖ pieces in hand: –

9	8	7	6	5	4	3	2	1
香	桂	玉	金		金		桂	香	1
		銀			飛	銀			2
	歩	歩	歩	歩		角	歩	歩	3
歩					歩	歩			4
							歩		5
歩		歩		歩					6
	歩		歩		歩	歩		歩	7
	角	玉		金	銀		飛		8
香	桂	銀	金				桂	香	9

☗ pieces in hand: –
9. G-58 K-71

9. G-58. Black's Boat castle is complete.

==== Final position ====
Left Silver-57 Rapid Attack
☖ pieces in hand: –

9	8	7	6	5	4	3	2	1
香	桂		金				桂	香	1
	王	銀		金	飛	銀			2
	歩	歩	歩	歩		角	歩	歩	3
歩					歩	歩			4
							歩		5
歩		歩		歩		歩			6
	歩		歩	銀	歩			歩	7
	角	玉		金	銀		飛		8
香	桂		金				桂	香	9

☗ pieces in hand: –

==== Transpositions ====
The sequence of moves shown above can also be flexibly transposed to different orders. Below are some other possible move sequences leading to the same position.

	Black (Note: This first alternate sequence is the order preferred by Suzuki (2016a, 2016b). Suzuki recommends leaving White's left gold in situ so that their rook is free to move to the 52 square if Black attacks with their bishop positioned on 97.)	White	Black (Note: This alternate sequence is the book line implied by Aono (1983). Aono points to the ... S-43 strategy and situates it before 13. P-25 B-33.)	White	Black (Note: This alternate sequence is the main line suggested by Hosking (1997).)	White	Black (Note: This is the sequence of moves inferred from Kitao (2011).)	White	Black (Note: Most common sequence of moves in Kyokumenpedia database from S-57 position.)	White	Black (Note: Most common sequence of moves in Kyokumenpedia database of professional players from start position to S-57 position.)	White	Black (Note: Most common sequence of moves in Kyokumenpedia database of high-ranked amateur players from start position to S-57 position.)	White	Black (Note: First main line sequence of older joseki given in Hidetchi's YouTube video.)	White	Black (Note: Second main line sequence of newer Fujii System joseki given in Hidetchi's YouTube video.)	White
4.	S-48	R-42	S-48	S-32	S-48	S-32	P-25	B-33	P-25	B-33	S-48	S-32	S-48	R-42	S-48	R-42	S-48	R-42
5.	K-68	K-62	P-56	R-42	P-56	R-42	S-48	R-42	S-48	S-32	P-56	R-42	P-56	K-62	P-56	K-62	K-68	S-72
6.	K-78	S-72	K-68	K-62	K-68	K-62	K-68	P-94	P-56	P-94	K-68	K-62	K-68	K-72	K-68	K-72	K-7	P-94
7.	P-56	K-72	K-78	K-72	K-78	K-72	P-96	K-6b	P-96	R-42	K-78	K-72	K-78	K-82	K-78	K-82	P-56	S-32
8.	G49-58	S-32	G49-58	K-82	G49-58	K-82	K-78	S-72	K-68	S-72	G49-58	K-82	G49-58	S-72	G49-58	S-72	G49-58	G-52
9.	P-25	B-33	S-68	S-72	P-96	P-94	P-56	K-71	K-78	K-62	P-96	P-94	S-68	P-94	P-36	S-32	P-96	K-62
10.	S-68	K-82	P-96	P-94	S-68	S-72	G49-58	S-32	G49-58	K-71	S-68	S-72	P-96	S-32	P-25	B-33	P-36	K-71
11.	P-36	P-94	P-36	G41-52	P-36	G41-52	P-36	K-82	P-36	G41-52	P-36	G41-52	S68-57	B-33	S-68	P-94	P-25	B-33
12.	P-96	S-43	S68-57	S-43	P-25	B-33	S-68	G41-52	S-68	K-82	S68-57	B-33	P-36	G41-52	P-96	G41-52	S-68	K-82
13.	S68-57	...	P-25	B-33	S68-57	...	S68-57	...	S68-57	...	P-25	...	P-25	...	S68-57	...	S68-57	...

== See also ==
- Static Rook

== Bibliography ==
- Aono, Teruichi (1983). Guide to shogi openings: Unlock the secrets of joseki 将棋定跡のカギ: 和英 定跡問題集. Translated by Fairbairn, John. 山海堂. ISBN 4-381-00598-8.
- Hosking, Tony (1996). The art of shogi. The Shogi Foundation. ISBN 978-0-95310-890-9.
- Kitao, Madoka (2011). Joseki at a glance. Translated by Kawasaki, Tomohide. Nekomado. ISBN 978-4-9052-2501-0.
- Kitao, Madoka (2013). Sabaki at a glance. Translated by Kawasaki, Tomohide. Nekomado. ISBN 978-4-9052-2510-2.
- Kitao, Madoka (2014). Ending attack at a glance. Translated by Kawasaki, Tomohide. Nekomado. ISBN 978-4-9052-2513-3.
- "Kyokumenpedia" 局面ペディア [Kyokumenpedia]. Kyokumenpedia (in Japanese). Team ISCube. 2016. Archived from the original on 2018-03-07.
- 鈴木, 大介 [Daisuke Suzuki] (2016a). "鈴木流四間飛車戦術: 四間飛車の基本". 鈴木大介の将棋講座. Episode 1. 銀河将棋チャンネル – via Niconico. (in Japanese)
- 鈴木, 大介 [Daisuke Suzuki] (2016b). "鈴木流四間飛車戦術: 対急戦の駒組み". 鈴木大介の将棋講座. Episode 2. 銀河将棋チャンネル – via Niconico. (in Japanese)
