= Yamada joseki =

Left Silver-5g Rapid Attack
☖ pieces in hand: –

9	8	7	6	5	4	3	2	1
香	桂		金				桂	香	1
	王	銀		金	飛	銀			2
	歩	歩	歩	歩		角	歩	歩	3
歩					歩	歩			4
							歩		5
歩		歩		歩		歩			6
	歩		歩	銀	歩			歩	7
	角	玉		金	銀		飛		8
香	桂		金				桂	香	9

☗ pieces in hand: –

In shogi, the Yamada joseki is a joseki for a Rapid Attack Static Rook vs Fourth File Rook opening.

It is named after Michiyoshi Yamada.

The Yamada joseki starts after the Static Rook player has developed a Left Silver-57 Rapid Attack formation with a Boat castle and the Ranging Rook player has constructed a Mino castle and kept their bishop diagonal closed.

After this position, the joseki details balanced play for four different responses to the Static Rook formation initiated by the Fourth File Rook opponent.

== See also ==
- Left Silver-57 Rapid Attack
- Saginomiya Joseki
- Fourth File Rook

== Bibliography ==
- Kitao, Madoka (2011). Joseki at a glance. Translated by Kawasaki, Tomohide. Nekomado. ISBN 978-4-9052-2501-0.
