= Tenuki =

Tenuki (手抜き) is a Japanese go term also commonly used among Western players. It describes ignoring a local sequence on the board in order to play elsewhere. The maneuver is related to the concepts of sente, or taking the initiative, and gote, deferring to the opponent by responding to the last play. Players will tenuki when they feel that their opponent's last move does not pose an urgent threat, and they judge that playing elsewhere would be to their advantage.

Experienced players try to control the flow of the game by making moves that leave them with effective follow-ups, thus forcing the opponent to respond. They look for weaknesses in the opponent's position and wait for a chance to tenuki so they can exploit those weaknesses. Novice players are less consistent, sometimes jumping carelessly away from situations in a risky way, and on other occasions being reluctant to play tenuki, a failing identified as following the opponent around.

Players may also tenuki even though the opponent's last move is somewhat damaging, if they feel that their play will be even more damaging to the opponent. They would be willing to accept the loss they anticipate, because they expect a greater gain from the move they make instead of answering. Players also tenuki when they believe that the opponent will be required to answer. If this happens, they can then go back and answer the previous move.

== See also ==
- Zwischenzug
