= Shape (Go) =

Concept in Go

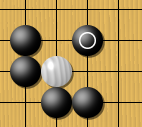
The net (geta) is commonly referenced as a good shape.

In the game of Go, shape describes the positional qualities of a group of stones. Descriptions of shapes in go revolve around how well a group creates or removes life and territory. Good shape can refer to the efficient use of stones in outlining territory, the strength of a group in a prospective fight, or making eye shapes so that a group may live. Bad shapes are inefficient in outlining territory and are heavy. Heavy groups cannot easily make eye shapes and are therefore good targets for attack. Understanding and recognizing the difference between good shape and bad is an essential step in becoming a stronger player.

Shape is not a rule; the surrounding position must always be taken into account. While it is useful for beginners to learn the common good and bad shapes presented here, sometimes a usually bad shape can be the best shape to play locally. This can be true if it forces the opponent to create an equally bad or worse shape, or if it accomplishes a specific tactical goal, such as the creation of eye-shape or the capture of an opponent's group.

"To make shape is to take a weak or defective position...and transform it into a strong one. Sometimes this can be done just by putting one stone down in the right place, but usually it takes sacrifice tactics...."

== Good shapes ==
Go board, 19 by 19. Black stones: B18, D18, D17, Q17, B16, C16, L16, K15, R15, B13, A12, B11, K11, R11, J10, L10, K9, R9, N5, O5, P5, D4, M4, Q4, R4, D3, L3, N3, S3, G2, L2, R2. White stones: C17, L17, D16, F16, K16, D15, F15, J15, D10, F10, Q10, D8, D6, M6, N6, O6, P6, M5, Q5, R5, S5, K4, L4, S4, K3, K2, K1. Marks: letter A at R10.A
From the top left corner, clockwise: Black has a net in the top left corner, which white has mistakenly tried to invade at c-17, putting the lone piece into a net. Just to the right is a white bamboo joint. To the right of that is a double turn on white's part. In the top right corner is a small knight's jump. On the right center portion of the board are two black stones that are being attacked by white at p-10. If black responds at the spot indicated by a, it would be a pole connection. The bottom right corner is a series of single turns played out, and a trumpet connection at m-3. A large knight's jump is in the bottom left corner at g-2. On the left side of the board is a series of one-space jumps. Just above that is a tiger's mouth. In the center of the board is a diamond shape.

- The turn (跳ね, Hane) is a move to be played when black and white stones are standing side by side and the player who plays diagonally at the end of the opponent's group gains an advantage. This play turns the mutual walls, whereby a player can both expand one's influence and press the opponent down. The Turn at the head of two (or three) stones is used to seize the initiative and to create a thick position.
- The double turn (二段バネ, Ni-dan bane), or two-step hane is two Turns played in succession. It can be an aggressive and appropriate move, but it generally exposes the group of stones to cutting.
- The diagonal (コスミ, Kosumi) is a generally conservative move that allows the stones connected by a Diagonal to be connected, even in the event of a cut, barring outside influences, as there are two cutting points. The Diagonal can also be used to attack into a shape or to solidify border territory.
- The one-space jump (一間トビ, Ikken tobi), especially from the middle of three stones, is often the vital point in making good shape. An old Go proverb says, "Don't try to cut the one-space jump." This is for good reason, as it is difficult to disconnect without a kikashi. It can also be the vital point for destroying the enemy's shape. The proverb, "my opponent's vital point is my vital point," often applies in regard to shape. Another way to say it is, "what is good for black is good for white." That is, if you can play there first, then you can destroy their shape.
- The knight's move (桂馬, Keima) is more fast-paced than either the diagonal move or the one-space jump. It is named after the resemblance to the movement of a knight in chess. It also makes a flexible and light shape and is useful in sabaki. Near the edge of the board the small knight's move is used to secure a base or to link up stones. However this shape can easily be cut. Hence, you must consider the surrounding stones and be prepared to sacrifice one of your own stones to make good shape. It is sometimes called the small knight's move in order to differentiate it from the large knight's move.
- The large knight's move (大ゲイマ, Ōgeima) is a more aggressive version of the small knight's move, and can be cut even more easily. It extends one square further, and is usually used in conjunction with stones already in the area that provide support for this move.
- The pole connection (棒つぎ, Bōtsugi) is a connection that renders solid a series of previous free-standing stones, into a line, which allows for solidarity and more influence.
- The Ponnuki (ポン抜き, Ponnuki) is a shape that has high defensive capabilities, in that, in order to cut any point of the shape, the opponent must either build up support around the shape or risk an atari when the invading stone is played without any support. It also exerts influence and support in every direction, and can be used to stage further attacks. This shape can be the result of playing with or without capturing an enemy stone - if an enemy stone was captured in the process, it is known as Ponnuki; the resulting shape is a diamond.
- The mouth shape (口, Kou) is a fundamental shape, good for forming an eye. It is half of a square, 2 stones by 2 stones in an "L". Its vital point is across the square, on the far "corner".
- The net (下駄, Geta) is a very effective shape for preventing the escape of an enemy's stones and for sabaki.
- The tiger's mouth (虎の口, Tora no kou), or hanging connection, is a one stone short of a diamond shape. It is so-called because an attacking stone would be under atari immediately if played directly in the "mouth" of the group.
- The lion's mouth (獅の口, Shi no kou), or trumpet connection, guards against two different possible attacks on a stone by creating two tiger's mouths at the vulnerable cutting points.
- The bamboo joint (タケフ, Takefu) is safe and can only be cut if short of liberties. whereas the one-space jump is good shape for outlining territory but can be cut by de-giri (to push through then cut and capture the weak side). The bamboo joint is the essence of flexibility. It has the beauty of an either-or choice, so that even if the opponent attacks first, you have a safe response.

== Bad shapes ==
Go board, 19 by 19. Black stones: B18, C18, L18, B17, C17, D17, E17, L17, C16, D16, E16, L16, M16, O16, D15, E15, N11, G6, H6, F5, G5, E4, F4. White stones: D19, D18, E18, F18, M18, A17, F17, M17, Q17, A16, B16, F16, B15, C15, F15, C14, D14, E14, G7, F6, J6, E5, H5, D4, G4, E3, F3. Moves: 1 white N17; 2 black H7. Marks: letter A at O17; triangle on black stone at N11.1A△2
On the top left corner is a dead black dumpling. On the top right is a white empty triangle - if white had played at a instead of white 1, the stones would not be as threatened as they are currently. On the bottom left is a ladder shape for black (black had just played at black 2). Black will win this ladder battle due to the stone marked with a triangle at n-11, but if the n-11 piece did not exist, then white would inevitably win when the regular pattern of play extended to the edge of the board.

- The empty triangle (空き三角, Akisankaku) is an undesirable formation of three stones that inefficiently removes liberties and creates a weak group.
- The ladder (シチョウ, Shichou) is not inherently a bad shape, but the inability to recognize when one is trapped in a ladder shape that cannot be won, can be fatal.
- The dumpling (団子, Dango) is any shape where a group of stones has been forced into a closely packaged lump with few liberties, no eyes and limited ability to counterattack.

== See also ==
- Go terms
