= Saginomiya joseki =

Position in Saginomiya joseki
☖ pieces in hand: –

| 9 | 8 | 7 | 6 | 5 | 4 | 3 | 2 | 1 |
| 香 | 桂 | | 金 | | | | 桂 | 香 | 1 |
| | 王 | 銀 | | 金 | 飛 | 銀 | | | 2 |
| | 歩 | 歩 | | | | 角 | 歩 | 歩 | 3 |
| 歩 | | | 歩 | 歩 | 歩 | 歩 | | | 4 |
| | | | | | | | 歩 | | 5 |
| 歩 | | 歩 | | 歩 | | 歩 | | | 6 |
| | 歩 | | 歩 | 銀 | 歩 | | | 歩 | 7 |
| | 角 | 玉 | 金 | 金 | 銀 | 飛 | | | 8 |
| 香 | 桂 | | | | | | 桂 | 香 | 9 |

☗ pieces in hand: –

In shogi, the Saginomiya joseki (鷺宮定跡 saginomiya jōseki) is a joseki for a Left Silver-5g Rapid Attack (Static Rook) vs Fourth File Rook (Ranging Rook) opening. It was originally conceived by Teruichi Aono between 1975 and 1985, and further popularized in title matches by Kunio Yonenaga. The name Saginomiya comes from the fact that both Aono and Yonenaga lived in the Saginomiya District of Nakano in Tokyo.

== See also ==
- Yamada joseki
- Left Silver-57 Rapid Attack
- Fourth File Rook
- Static Rook

== Bibliography ==
- Kitao, Madoka (2011). Joseki at a glance. Translated by Kawasaki, Tomohide. Nekomado. ISBN 978-4-9052-2501-0.
