= Chinese opening =

Opening pattern in the game of Go

The Chinese opening (often Chinese fuseki) (Japanese: 中国流布石, chūgokuryū fuseki; Chinese: 中国流布局; pinyin: zhōngguóliú bùjú) is an opening pattern in the game of Go. It refers to the placement of Black 1, Black 3 and Black 5 at the start of the game; and so, depending on White's plays, is a complex of whole-board go openings.

It is distinguished by rapid development on the side, rather than making a corner enclosure, inviting White to start an invasion. It has a fairly long history, originally used by Japanese player Hajime Yasunaga, and introduced to Chinese Go at a later stage, but the Chinese player Chen Zude pioneered it in top-level play.

The Chinese style became very popular in Japan from about 1970 onwards, and has by Go standards a thoroughly-researched theory. It has two variants: high (with 5 in the diagram on the fourth line) and low (as depicted). There is also a so-called "mini"-Chinese fuseki, an attack against the opponent's corner and placement of a stone midway between the attacking stone and a friendly corner. These are now amongst the most important patterns in go opening theory.

== Low Chinese fuseki ==
Low Chinese Fuseki.

== Low Chinese fuseki (variation) ==
Low Chinese Fuseki (variation).

== High Chinese fuseki ==
High Chinese Fuseki.

== Mini Chinese fuseki ==
Mini Chinese Fuseki.

== Micro Chinese Fuseki ==
Micro Chinese Fuseki.
