= Chen Zude =

Chinese Go player

Personal information
- Native name: Trad. 陳祖德 Simp. 陈祖德 (Chinese); Chén Zǔdé (Pinyin)
- Born: February 19, 1944 Shanghai China
- Died: November 1, 2012 (aged 68) Beijing, China

Sport
- Teacher: Gu Shuiru and Liu Dihuai
- Rank: 9 dan
- Affiliation: Zhongguo Qiyuan

Chen Zude (simplified Chinese: 陈祖德; traditional Chinese: 陳祖德; pinyin: Chén Zǔdé; February 19, 1944 – November 1, 2012) was a Chinese professional Go player. He was also the President of the Chinese Chess Association. He died of pancreatic cancer on November 1, 2012.

== Go career ==
Zude was one of China's most decorated Go players. He was believed to be the founder of "Chinese fuseki". Although, according to Kato Masao, this pattern originated in Japan, Chen was the person who made this fuseki famous. Yasunaga Hajime, a Japanese pro-level amateur and teacher of many professionals, claims in his books that Chen saw the fuseki first when attending a study group and exhibition matches organized by Yasunaga and held in China.

Zude was President of the Zhongguo Qiyuan and also served in the Chinese Weiqi Association from 1992 - 2003 as chairman. He was awarded 9 dan in 1982.

Zude was the first Chinese Go player in the modern era to attain the rank of 9-dan.

Chinese fuseki (Black).

== Titles ==
Title	Years Held
Current	3
(China) National Go Individual	1964, 1966, 1974

Title	Years Held
Current	2
(China) National Go Individual	1962
(China) New Sports Cup	1979

== See also ==
- Chess in China

Preceded by Li Menghua	Chairman of Chinese Weiqi Association; 1988 – 2006	Succeeded by Wang Runan
New title	President of Zhongguo Qiyuan; 1992 – 2003	Succeeded by Wang Runan
