= Hajime Yasunaga =

Japanese Go player

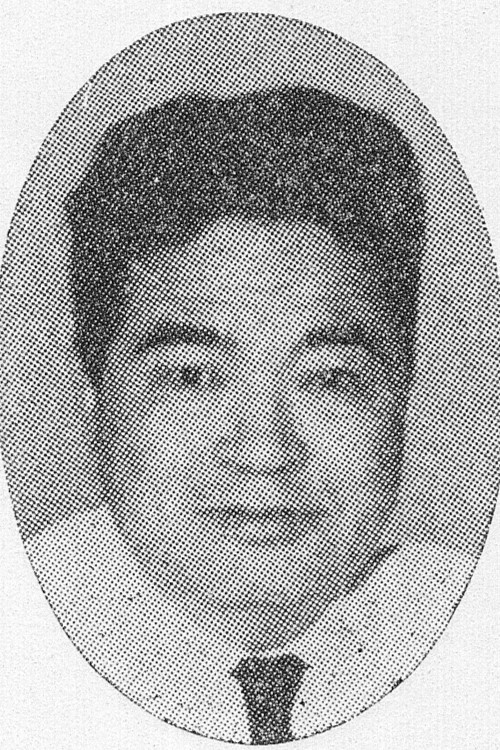

Personal information
- Born: December 3, 1901 Japan
- Died: February 2, 1994 (aged 92)

Sport
- Pupil: Komatsu Hideki, Kageyama Toshiro, Yokoyama Koichi
- Rank: 7 dan

Yasunaga Hajime (安永 一; December 3, 1901 – February 2, 1994) was the strongest and most famous amateur Go player of the 20th century in Japan. As a professional Go journalist, author and editor, and long-time undisputed strongest amateur player in Japan, Yasunaga was personally acquainted with most of the strong Japanese professional players from the 1920s to the 1980s.

== Shin Fuseki Ho ==
In the early 1930s he co-wrote Shin Fuseki Ho, a seminal work on go opening theory, in cooperation with the young professionals Kitani Minoru and Go Seigen. The book created a sensation, and helped win amateur players over to the revolutionary ideas of shin fuseki ("new opening") theory.

== Representing Japan ==
Yasunaga twice represented Japan in the World Amateur Go Championship, first in the inaugural tournament (when he was 77), and then again three years later when he was 80. He acquitted himself well in both tournaments, but was not able to prevail against the strong fields of younger players. He also taught a number of professionals, including Komatsu Hideki and Kageyama Toshiro and Yokoyama Koichi. It has been said that at his peak, Yasunaga was sometimes able to defeat inexperienced young professional players while giving them two-stone handicaps.

Yasunaga played against Chen Zude in the 1963 China-Japan Supergo event.

== See also ==
- Go players
