= Life and death =

Concept in the game of Go

Life and death (死活, shikatsu) is a fundamental concept in the game of Go, where the status of a specific group of stones is determined as either being "alive", where they may remain on the board indefinitely, or "dead", where the group will be "captured" and removed from the board. The basic idea can be summarized by:

A group must have a means to evade capture -- forever -- by having at least two liberties that can not be filled at the same time (by having at least two "eyes") to sustain itself.

== Explanation ==
The concept of life and death is a consequence of two basic Go rules.

- A group of stones with no liberties is captured.
- A stone may not be played on a position where it will be captured directly, unless it directly captures another group.

Because of these rules, some groups can never be captured (and thus are alive), while others cannot avoid capture (and thus are dead even if they have not yet been removed from the board).

The group at a is not alive, but may become alive, so is unsettled. The group at b is dead. The group at c and d is alive.

=== Examples ===
See the diagram on the right, and suppose white tries to capture the black groups:

- a: White is not allowed to play a, because a white stone at a would be captured immediately, and so would be a suicide.

- b: White may play b, because the black group will be completely surrounded first, and thus it is captured, and the black stones will be immediately removed from the board.

- c & d: White cannot play c or d because the black group still has another liberty after one stone is placed. So, playing at c or d would be suicide.

The black group surrounding c & d can never be captured, so it is called alive. The group has two separate liberties, where white cannot play. A group such as b that cannot become alive is called dead. Groups that are neither alive nor dead are called unsettled, and their fate will be resolved later.

e and f are eyes, g is a false eye.

=== Eyes and false eyes ===
Liberties inside a group are called eyes. In the previous example, a, b, c and d are eyes. An eye may be a single empty intersection, or more of them. In the diagram on the left, the intersections marked e form a single eye, and f forms another eye. The group has two—separated—eye spaces. Even though white can make a move in these eyes, black could eventually capture the white stones, and each eye would thereby be reduced to a single intersection.

An inner liberty where the opponent can still capture part of the group that encloses this liberty is called a 'false eye' or 'deficient eye'. A group with only one eye is not alive. In the example on the left, white can play at g, and capture a black stone. That eye is then destroyed, and black has only one eye left, so that group is now dead. The black group at g is dead, because it can not form two true eyes.

== Importance ==
Life and death situations and issues occur when an area with a group of stones surrounds a small area (<7 points) so that it may not be possible to form two separate independent "eyes". As the board fills up during the course of the game, certain groups will survive, and others may not. A group with a single eye can normally be captured, in the end, by filling first round the outside. The purpose of making two eyes is to prevent this. Novices sometimes interpret making two eyes in a narrow way, and form 'explicit' eyes one by one. This is often the wrong approach, and it is better to play generally to make a territory inside a group out of which two eyes can surely be made, if and when the opponent attacks it. Groups with seven or more points of territory can usually form two eyes when attacked, unless there are structural weaknesses.

Because the loss of a group can mean the loss of the game, and because the efficient use of each move is important, knowing the life and death status of one's own groups (as well as one's opponent's) is an important skill to cultivate, if one is to become a strong player. The correct, accurate plays with which to make a group secure, or to kill the opponent's group, are studied deeply by all strong players.

== Status of a group ==
The concept of 'status' is discussed in Life and Death by James Davies. Groups of stones are divided into those that are alive, dead or unsettled. Here alive, for example, is an unconditional judgement made, that with best play from both players, the group can survive to the end of the game. That assumes the opponent starts: the alive status means that, whatever the attack made, there is an adequate defensive answer.

The unsettled status is therefore most worthy of attention, according to James Davies. By playing first, the attacking player can kill such a group. By playing first, the defending player can save such a group. There is an enormous range of formations that are unsettled.

A group can be considered "alive", "dead", or "unsettled" based on whether two eyes can be made regardless of how the opponent plays. Naturally, one space is insufficient. Two adjacent spaces are insufficient to make two eyes as well, since putting a stone in will create one eye only. The opponent can simply fill in one of the two spots, threatening to fill in the other, forcing the player to capture that one by playing in the second one. Then, the opponent simply plays there again, killing the group. Usually this will not be done during the game, but at the end, during calculation, the group will be labeled "dead" and removed as prisoners. The only way to actually remove a group from the board is to fill its "eye space" with all but one, forcing it to capture the filling-in group by putting a stone in the last space. If the created group is not alive, then continuing this process will eventually kill the entire group.

=== Status of groups of three ===
Unsettled groups with three empty points

There are two possible groups of three, an "r" shape and three in a line. Both of these are unsettled, as whoever plays obtains the desirable result. The person trying to create two eyes can play in the middle spot (the one connected to the other two) and the other two are now eyes. If the opponent plays, they will play in the same spot, followed by an adjacent spot (the other player's piece would be captured were they to play in one of the two open spots), leaving only one empty spot left. This forces the first player to capture, leaving the dead two shape. The critical points are circled in the "Unsettled groups with three empty points" diagram.

=== Status of groups of four ===
Groups with four empty points

With four blank spots, there are five unique shapes. Three are alive, one is unsettled, and one is dead.

The three alive ones are the straight line, L and Z shape. If the opponent plays in any spot, the first player can live by playing in the adjacent spot in the center two. In the diagram "Groups with four empty points" black's groups in the upper corners are alive. If the opponent plays any of the circled positions, playing the other circled position will secure the status of the black group.

The unsettled shape is the four-stone pyramid, shown in the left bottom corner. Whoever plays in the circled center spot gets the desired result, so the player whose move it is wins.

A two-by-two square space is dead: if black plays in the top left corner of the two-by-two square, white can respond by playing in the bottom right corner (see the L-shaped case in the previous section). On the other hand, if white wants to capture the black group, they only have to play anywhere inside the square, and there will be no way for black to avoid capture.

=== Status of groups with more than four empty points ===
There are no dead shapes with more than four empty points, though there are a couple of unsettled ones.

Unsettled groups with five empty points

A five stone "plus sign" (the X pentomino) and a "bulky five" (the P pentomino consisting of a square and one point off it, similar shape to a fist with the thumb extended) are the two unsettled ones. Playing in the point that touches the most others (four in the "plus sign" - center point, three in the "bulky five" - the one point in the square touching the outside point) will give the desired result to whoever does so.

Unsettled groups with six empty points

There are two unsettled six shapes, and the rest are all alive (see also miai).

One shape is the "rabbity six" — a square, plus adding the two points touching any one of the corners. (Similar to the plus sign five, but add any of the four taken corner points to get the unsettled six.) The opponent playing in the center point threatens to fill all but one spot with a bulky five shape, and there is no defense.

The other is the rectangular six in the corner. The opponent playing first in the top middle of the rectangle can kill the group. The defender playing first can save it by playing either there, or at the lower middle (denoted a).

Any group surrounding more than six points is alive, but it may be necessary to respond correctly if the opponent attacks. Additionally, because of special properties of the corner, a group with more than six points might not be unconditionally alive, as it is possible for the opponent to make an eye or two within its territory.

== Seki ==
Seki

There is a possibility for stones to be alive without eyes. This situation happens when two groups of otherwise dead stones face each other without being able to achieve capture.

The figure on the right shows one of the most simple seki. The black and white stones in contact with the circled points do not have any eyes and may seem dead. However, if Black tries to capture white, they must fill one of the circled points, which will only lead to its own capture by white. The same applies to White, who cannot fill black liberties without being captured first.

Since none of the players can kill the other, the situation is considered settled. The black and white stones are said to be alive in seki.

== Caveats ==
Groups that are alive may yet die. One reason is that they may be sacrificed, in the course of a ko fight.

Another way in which the ko rule enters the discussion is through the complications ko adds to the classification by status. It is quite possible for a group to be alive in ko: that is, the group is conditionally alive, the condition being to be able to win a particular ko fight relating to the control of a key intersection.

== Dead stones ==
Virtually all games will have at least a few dead stones, which remain on the board at the end of the game, when both players pass. Those dead stones are then removed, in an operation often called 'cleaning', which is a separate phase of the game. The stones removed are treated exactly like other captured stones. Under Chinese rules, which use area counting, stones removed during the cleaning phase are returned to their bowls.

It is a novice mistake to carry out the capture of dead stones before it is of tactical importance to do so. Such plays, during the game, waste a turn and may also cost points.

Single stones and small groups are often sacrificed. In cases where a group is more than of sacrificial value, that group typically must make life in order for one to have a chance at winning the overall game.

Generally each side will have at most 4–5 living groups on the board at the end of the game. There is a go proverb that says that "Five groups may live, but the sixth will die" which in a nutshell describes the need to emphasise connection between developing groups. The struggle for life can be solved by connection. Since each group needs two eyes, (and eyes are sometimes hard to come by) the alternative is to connect out to another group, thereby sharing both liberties and eyes.

== Aji ==
Even if a group is lost, one can still use one's own dead stones for aji (potential). Ko threats are just one way in which apparently dead stones are put to good use. Expert players use a variety of 'squeezing' tactics, of which semedori, an advanced endgame technique, and shibori are two that have recognised Japanese-language names.

== See also ==
- Tsumego – Type of go problem
