= Ponnuki =

Concept in Go

Ponnuki (ポン抜き, ponnuki; traditional Chinese: 開花; simplified Chinese: 开花; pinyin: kāi huā; Korean: 빵따냄 ppang-ttanaem or 빵때림 ppang-ttaerim; lit. 'open flower') is a Japanese term in the game of Go that refers to capturing a single stone, resulting in a diamond shape. The shape of the remaining capturing stones is considered to be very strong, due to its influence in all directions. A certain Go proverb says: "A Ponnuki is worth 30 points".

Go board, 9 by 9. Black stones: E6, F5, E4. White stones: E5. Moves: 1 black D5.1

Ponnuki move by Black 1

A diamond shape (4 stones touching the same empty spot) is considered a ponnuki only when constructed by capturing the middle stone.

Depending on the context (other stones on the board), a ponnuki may be strong and thick but inefficient (overconcentrated).

== Etymology ==
The word ponnuki (ポン抜き) breaks up into pon and nuki, in which pon is the sound of a cork when taken from a bottle, while nuki means "taking out" (noun), the expression means, 'to pop the cork', a poetic reference to taking the stone out of the centre.
