= Taisha jōseki =

Opening move sequence for a game of Go

Taisha jōseki

The taisha starts here; a White move at 'a' leads to the line with most subvariations.

The taisha jōseki (大斜定石) is the Japanese term for the most celebrated of all joseki (standardized sequences) in the game of go. It is often described in go literature as having hundreds of variations (大斜百変); this is more than a figure of speech, since many hundreds of subvariations have been documented, in high-level games, books and magazine articles. Taisha means 'large slant'.

== History ==
The taisha was first seriously played at the beginning of the nineteenth century. For several decades, although the complicated variations may have been known and privately studied, they hardly appeared in important games. (Since the taisha formation can also occur when White has a pincer in place, on the top side of the board in the diagram, it would have been studied also in that context.) Then in the 1840s, the complex of variations that develops in one particular line began to be explored. These depend on external factors (the available ladder tactics) and can in some cases lead to difficult ko fights and capturing races. This joseki then gained the reputation for intricacy that it has retained, though in the latter part of the twentieth century the nadare joseki became its rival on that score.

== Current use ==
The taisha fits less well into contemporary opening strategies than the nadare, so is not seen with such frequency. It is still played at the top level, as of 2006. One leading exponent of strategies around the taisha is Ishida Yoshio.

== Strategy ==
In playing the taisha, Black is stretching out the shape to the limits. In the diagram, a black play at b instead of 1 is an ordinary pressing play. One point closer to the edge, at c, and this becomes a one-point pincer, a very forceful play. One point further away, at d, it becomes a two-point high pincer, of a very different and better balanced character. In a sense Black is trying to have the best of all worlds. If White doesn't try to break through Black's large, slanting play, Black usually gets a locally favourable result.

Therefore, White's resort to trying to cut across Black is often forced, in effect, by the wish not to submit and play passively. There will then arise (at least) a running fight with groups in the centre striving for position. Taisha strategies on a whole side of the board (the top side, in the diagram) are typically premised on such a fight arising, and the preparation of a reception party further along the side.
