= Go proverb =

Aphorism about the board game gained from experience

Go proverbs are traditional proverbs relating to the game of Go, generally used to help one find good moves in various situations during a game. They are generalizations and thus a particular proverb will have specific situations where it is not applicable. Knowing when a proverb is inapplicable is part of the process of getting stronger as a Go player. Indeed, several proverbs contradict each other—however they agree in as much as they advise the player to pay attention to the stated situation.

Go proverbs, life-or-death problems (tsumego), and compilations of go games (kifu) are the three major traditional teaching resources for the game of go.

Several books relating to Go proverbs have been written, for example Go Proverbs illustrated by Kensaku Segoe (瀬越憲作) was published in 1960. Such books do not just quote the proverb but spend their pages explaining the meaning and application of the proverbs.

Some proverbs have a more general applicability. For example, one famous proverb is to move where your opponent wants to move. This may be used as a heuristic in games such as Scrabble.

== Proverbs ==
- Add a second stone to one on the third line then abandon both.
- An eye of six points in a rectangle is alive.
- Don't make dangos.
- Don't make empty triangles.
- Don't peep at a cutting point.
- Don't peep at both sides of a bamboo joint.
- Even a moron connects against a peep.
- Do not be greedy! Chinese: 贪不得胜; pinyin: Tān bùdé shèng; lit. 'Greed cannot prevail'
- Play fast, lose fast.
- Don't play 1, 2, 3–just play 3.
- For rectangular six in the corner to live, liberties are necessary.
- Hane at the head of three stones.
- Hane at the head of two stones.
- If you don't understand ladders then don't play Go.
- If you have lost all four corners then you have lost.
- If you have secured all four corners then you have lost.
- In a fight, contact plays strengthen the underdog.
- In a semeai capture the ko on the final play.
- In the corner six stones live but four stones die.
- Keep your stones connected.
- Learn the eye-stealing tesuji.
- Lose your first 50 games as quickly as possible.
- Never try to cut bamboo joints.
- On the second line eight stones live but six stones die.
- On the third line, four will die but six will live.
- Play in the centre of a symmetrical formation.
- Ponnuki is worth 30 points.
- Separate your opponent's stones.
- Strange things happen at the 1–2 points.
- Strike at the waist of the knight's move.
- The carpenter's square becomes ko.
- The comb formation is alive.
- The monkey jump is worth 8 points.
- The weak carpenter's square is dead.
- There is death in the hane.
- You only have one weak group. Your other weak groups are dead.
- Your enemy's key point is your own key point.
