= Fuseki =

Whole board opening in the game of Go

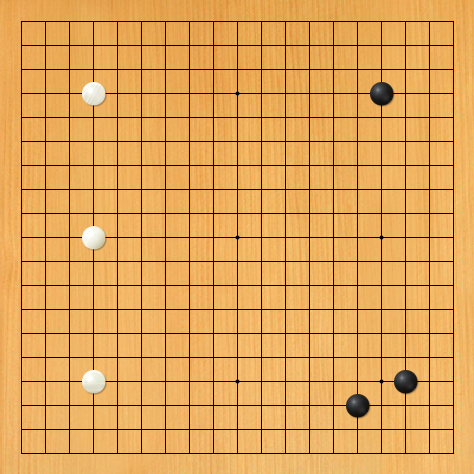
Fuseki example

Fuseki (Japanese: 布石; simplified Chinese: 布局; traditional Chinese: 佈局; pinyin: Bùjú) is the whole board opening in the game of Go.

== Characteristics ==
=== Less systematic ===
Since each move is typically isolated and unforced (i.e., not a sente move), patterns for play on the whole board have seen much less systematic study than for Joseki, which are often contact moves which require specific and immediate responses. Hence a game of Go may easily explore an unfamiliar path.

=== Recognised names ===
Only a proportion of fusekis have recognised or specific names. These include the two-star fuseki (nirensei fuseki), three-star fuseki (sanrensei fuseki), Chinese fuseki, Kobayashi fuseki, and Shusaku fuseki. These are names for the influential formations which Black makes in the opening.

== Type of fuseki ==
=== Territorial approach ===
As played on a large board (e.g., the standard 19x19 line goban), traditional wisdom says the priority is to play corner enclosures, then to extend to the middle of the sides, and finally to the center because it is easier to secure territory in the corners than on the sides or in the center. The classical view, particularly for the 3–3, 3–4 or 4–3 point, emphasizes good points to play in the opening because these points ensure larger or faster corner enclosure. Higher points are discouraged. This approach has clearer goals (control territory in the corners) and is easier for beginners to grasp and play.

=== Influence-oriented approach ===
Unlike the territory-oriented playing style, this approach emphasizes control of the center. The reason for this is that one's play should not be narrowly focused on attempting to secure points quickly by occupying the corners first. Although it requires more effort to secure the center, it constitutes the majority of territory on the board. The key is to build a good framework in order to control the center of the board. Higher points like 4–4, 4–5 or 5–4 are encouraged. Some players occupy the side very quickly in order to build up a good framework, while some place their stones around the center. However, the influence-oriented approach is more abstract and harder for beginners to grasp and play.

== History ==
=== Pre-20th century ===
The development of fuseki was very limited in the distant past, because nearly all players' efforts were put into making corner plays and enclosures (Joseki). Until about 1900, professional players made use only of a relatively small proportion of the currently established patterns in the opening. The range of possibilities is great, and the number of high-level game records that are actually published is not low (only a few thousand a year).

=== First half of 20th century ===
Fuseki did not see significant improvement until the influence-oriented style of play evolved in the 20th century. Perhaps the most highly regarded pioneer player of the 20th century, Go Seigen, created an uproar when he played his third move (black 5) on the tengen, or center point in a game against the reigning Honinbo Shusai. An unwise move in classical thinking, it was considered an insult to someone of the Honinbo's stature. Go Seigen lost the controversial 4-month game (which is believed to be due to help from one of the Honinbo's students), but proved his ability against high-ranking opponents, even when employing such an unusual strategy.

=== Second half of 20th century ===
The concept of influence-oriented play gave birth to many revolutionary fuseki such as the two-star fuseki (nirensei fuseki), three-star fuseki (sanrensei fuseki) and so on. Many similar patterns have been tried and played in modern games.

The Chinese fuseki, which was popularized by Chinese players in the 1970s, has a thoroughly-researched theory.

Since around 1990, there has been a succession of fashionable openings, largely a product of Korean professionals, which have been studied and played in a more chess-like manner (that is, with successive refinements hammered out in high-profile games). This style of innovation is actually something new to the go tradition, however; it is not the traditional way, and there is a large part of go strategy that remains unexplored to that degree of intensity.

== See also ==
- Go opening theory
