= Ladder (Go) =

Zig-zag pattern of moves in Go

Go board, 19 by 19. Black stones: J11, D4. White stones: D5, C4, D3, E3. Moves: 1 black E4; 2 white F4; 3 black E5; 4 white E6; 5 black F5; 6 white G5; 7 black F6; 8 white F7; 9 black G6. Marks: X at L12; triangle on black stone at J11; X at K11; letter A at J10; X at M10; X at H9; X at L9; X at G8; X at K8; X at J7; letter C at D6; X at H6; letter D at G4.X△XAXXXXX8XC479X35612D
A ladder shape for black (it is white's move). Black will win this ladder battle due to the marked black stone, which will put the white stone that will be played at the spot indicated by a into atari; if the marked stone did not exist, then white would inevitably win when the regular pattern of play extended to the edge of the board. A broken ladder is full of opportunities for a double atari on white, such as positions c and d.

In the game of Go, a ladder (四丁, シチョウ, shichō; Chinese: 征子, romanized: zhēng zǐ) is a basic sequence of moves in which an attacker pursues a group in atari in a zig-zag pattern across the board. If there are no intervening stones, the group will hit the edge of the board and be captured.

The sequence is so basic that there is a Go proverb saying "if you don't know ladders, don't play Go."

The ladder tactic fails if there are stones supporting those being chased close enough to the diagonal path of the ladder. Such a failing ladder is called a broken ladder. Secondary double threat tactics around ladders, involving playing a stone in such a way as to break the ladder and also create some other possibility, are potentially very complex. Such a play is called a ladder breaker.

A ladder can require reading 50 or more moves ahead, which even amateur players can do, as most of the moves are forced. Although ladders are one of the first techniques which human players learn, AlphaGo Zero was only able to handle them much later in its training than many other Go concepts. Other Go AI such as AlphaGo (before AlphaGo Zero) or KataGo use information about ladder outcomes as input features of their neural nets.

== See also ==
- Lee's Broken Ladder Game
