= Shinfuseki =

Shinfuseki (新布石) or new opening strategy was the change of attitude to go opening theory that set in strongly in Japan in 1933. It corresponds, a little later, to hypermodern play in chess, with the inversion that shinfuseki thought the center of the board had been unjustly underemphasised.

In the 1930s, a group of Japanese players led by Kitani Minoru and Go Seigen began to question conventional wisdom on Go openings. Playing for early central influence, they emphasised in the early part of the opening fighting concepts such as thickness and moyo. Among the new concepts of shinfuseki was playing the first move on the center point.

Traditional opening play followed a basic principle of sound play that can be summarized in three words — "corner, side, center." Territory is easiest to surround in the corner, because two sides are bounded by the edge of the board; on the side, one edge is available, but in center the territory must be completely surrounded on four sides. Shinfuseki thinking saw this approach as too narrow. For three or four years radical innovation was tried.

Subsequent opening theory has partly accepted these ideas, and dropped others. Contemporary players such as Takemiya Masaki and Yamashita Keigo have added their own personal innovations to the stock of opening ideas rooted in shinfuseki. In 1999, Go Seigen commented that "The 'new opening' period was only a step on the way to the perfecting of go... As I have already said, go should be played over the whole board. In that respect Shin Fuseki was an ideal style to stimulate the creativity of players beyond fixed josekis (corner patterns) and to broaden understanding of the game."

== Example of shinfuseki ==
One of the most famous games of the 20th century was played in 1933 between Honinbō Shūsai, head of the traditional Honinbō school and holder of the highest title in the Go world, and Go Seigen, representative of the new wave.

Honinbō Shūsai (White) vs. Go Seigen (Black)

Black began the game by boldly occupying the 3-3 point in the upper right, the 4-4 point in the lower left, and the center point. White countered by occupying the corners in the upper left and lower right. With move 21, Black completed a sphere of influence in the center. By the late middle game Black had built up a promising position, but White's move 160 was a brilliant move in the center that put White back in the game and eventually led to the capture of five Black stones on the right. White won the game by two points.
