= Inoue Gennan Inseki =

Japanese Go player

Personal information
- Native name: 井上幻庵因碩 (Japanese)
- Full name: Inoue Gennan Inseki
- Born: 1798 Japan
- Died: 1859 (aged 60–61)

Sport
- Rank: 8 dan

Gennan Inseki Inoue (井上幻庵因碩, Inoue Gennan Inseki; 1798–1859) was a Japanese professional go player, and head of the Inoue house from 1824 to 1846. He proposed a changed numbering that made him the eleventh head (rather than tenth), by including Doseki at the head of the list.

At various times he was known as Hattori Rittetsu, Inoue Ansetsu, Intetsu, Gennan Inseki, Inoue Gennan Inseki. He was involved in one of the most famous games, the so-called Ear-reddening game against Hon'inbō Shūsaku.

Preceded by Inoue Insa Inseki	Inoue Inseki; 1824–1846	Succeeded by Inoue Setsuzan Inseki
