= Ko fight =

Tactic of the board game Go

An example of a situation in which the ko rule applies

A ko fight (Japanese: コウ, 劫, kō, from the translation of the Sanskrit term kalpa) is a tactical and strategic phase that can arise in the game of Go.

== Ko threats and ko fights ==
The existence of ko fights is implied by the rule of ko, a special rule of the game that prevents repetition of position, by a short 'loop' in which a single stone is captured, and another single stone immediately taken back. The rule states that a repetition of position is forbidden, and sometimes recapturing a stone would cause such a position. This gives rise to the following procedure: the 'banned' player makes a play, which may have no particular good qualities, but which demands an instant reply. Then the ban has come to its end, and recapture is possible. This kind of distracting play is termed a ko threat.

If White, say, chooses to play a ko threat, and Black responds to the threat instead of ending the ko in some fashion, then White can recapture the stone that began the ko. This places Black in the same position that White was formerly in: Black can choose to give up the ko, or to find a ko threat. If Black and White alternate making ko threats with recapturing the ko, they are having a ko fight.

== Outcomes ==
Eventually, one of three things will happen.

- One player will decide that winning the ko immediately is more important than responding to their opponent's latest ko threat. The player will move so that their opponent cannot recapture the ko, and his opponent gets to follow up on his last ko threat, effectively making two moves in one area of the board.
- One player will run out of ko threats. That player will be forced to make a play that his opponent does not have to respond to immediately, and his opponent wins the ko immediately.
- One player will decide that playing elsewhere on the board is more important than continuing the ko. The opponent can either win the ko, or play elsewhere on the board.

== Practical evaluation ==
Before deciding to start a ko, it is worthwhile evaluating what threats are available to both players, so that one can decide which side is likely to win the ko fight. Many of the playing skills come together in ko fighting (evaluating the value of moves; reading ahead to find likely moves of the opponent and best responses; choosing the best order of moves), and it is a topic of much discussion among players. This also causes many beginners to be fearful of fighting a ko, since they are not confident of their ability to evaluate threats.

The importance of a ko varies dramatically depending on the positions of the two players. Some kos offer very little gain for either player, such as three points or less. Others control the fate of large portions of the board, sometimes even the whole board, and the outcome of those kos can determine the winner of the game. For this reason, finding and using ko threats well is a very important skill.

== Ko threat strategy ==
In general, when considering moves take into account the ko threat implications. Favor situations which give you more ko threats and your opponent fewer.

=== Before the fight ===
- Count ko threats.
- In anticipation of an upcoming ko fight, consider creating potential ko threats.
- Or, by the same token, find ways to eliminate ko threats on the part of your opponent

Especially local ko threats, and double ko threats, meaning they work as ko threats for both sides.

=== During the fight ===
- If you have one or more ko threats "big enough" (threatening enough damage), so that your opponent should answer them, play the smallest one.
- If you will win the ko at your next opportunity, and a new ko begins or threatens to come about while the ko threat situation remains the same, you will be glad you only played your smallest effective threat.
- Otherwise, play the biggest one you have.

If you will lose the ko, you want to get the most you can in exchange for it.

- Try to avoid ko threats which lose points—i.e. loss-making threats.
- Try to make ko threats which are moves you would have liked to play anyway.
- Your ko threat needs to be a real threat; otherwise, it is called mukou.
- You should give absolute priority to local ko threats, which threaten to resolve the local situation in your favor regardless of the outcome of the ko, and which your opponent therefore has to answer at the risk of making the ko meaningless.

There may be exceptions to the above advice. Whether to play a ko threat, and if so, which one, can be very subtle questions.

== Complex situations involving ko ==
One curiosity is the existence of multiple kos on the same board at the same time. A double ko is a situation when two kos are potentially being fought, simultaneously and affecting the same local position. Such positions are uncommon, but do sometimes arise in actual play, affecting life and death or connection issues. No number of kos can form a loop, as any repeat of the same game state is prohibited.

There are other, stronger ko rules, the main class being superko, where repeating positions of any cycle length are impossible within the rules of Go. Such events, however, are extremely uncommon and many go players may play their whole lives without restarting a game due to a triple ko.

Such rule issues, therefore, are more a matter of principle, although considerable attention has been devoted to them.
