= List of Go terms =

Players of the game of Go often use jargon to describe situations on the board and surrounding the game. Such technical terms are likely to be encountered in books and articles about Go in English as well as other languages. Many of these terms have been borrowed from Japanese, mostly when no short equivalent English term could be found. This article gives an overview of the most important terms.

== Use of Japanese terms ==
Although Go originated in China before the Confucian era, where it is called Weiqi, the current English and Western technical vocabulary borrows a high proportion of terms from the Japanese language because it was through Japan that the West was introduced to Go.

Many of these terms are from a jargon used for technical Go writing and are to some extent specially developed for Go journalism. Some authors of English-language Go materials avoid use of Japanese technical terms, and the way they are applied can differ in subtle ways from the original meanings.

A few Korean-language terms have come into use (e.g., Korean: haengma as a way of describing the development of stones).

== Terms ==
=== Aji ===
Go board, 11 by 7. Black stones: D9, E9, B8, C8, E6, D5, C4. White stones: C9, D8, D7, C6, C2. Moves: 1 white F7; 2 black E7; 3 white E8; 4 black F8; 5 white F9; 6 black G8; 7 white D10; 8 black E10; 9 white F10. Marks: triangle on white stone at C9; square on white stone at D8; square on white stone at D7; square on white stone at C6.789△534621
The aji of the triangled stone enables White to escape.

Aji (Japanese: 味; Chinese: 味道; pinyin: wèi dào; Wade–Giles: wei^{4} tao^{4}, Korean 맛 [ma:t]) meaning 'taste' refers to the latent potential of stones to open various avenues of play. The aji in various positions on the board impacts the course of the game regardless of whether a player makes moves to realize the latent potential. A situation is said to contain bad aji when the presence of the opponent's stones or weaknesses in one's own position create a threat of compromising the position at an opportune moment in the game. It can be very difficult for players to assess the best moment to play a move to realize the potential of aji in a position or to remove the threat of bad aji in one's own position.

In the diagram, the triangled stone is dead, and the three squared white stones appears to be trapped. However, the aji of the triangled stone enables White to escape by jumping to White 1. If black resists, the two black stones can be captured with the help of the triangled stone.

=== Atari ===
Go board, 9 by 9. Black stones: B9, D9, A8, G8, B7, F7, D6, F6, H6, B5, E5, G5, C4, C3, F3, A2, B2, D2, E2, G2, D1. White stones: C9, B8, G7, E6, G6, A4, B4, A3, B3, F2, E1, F1. Marks: triangle on white stone at C9; triangle on white stone at B8; letter A at C8; letter A at E7; triangle on white stone at G7; letter A at H7; triangle on white stone at E6; triangle on white stone at G6; letter A at A5; triangle on white stone at A4; triangle on white stone at B4; triangle on white stone at A3; triangle on white stone at B3; triangle on white stone at F2; triangle on white stone at E1; triangle on white stone at F1; letter A at G1.△△AA△A△△A△△△△△△△A
The triangled stones are in atari.

Atari (当たり) is a term for a situation where a stone or group of stones has only one liberty and may be captured on the next move if unable to attain additional liberties. A group in such a situation is said to be in atari or under atari. Beginners often verbally call out "atari" in a manner similar to calling out "check" in chess, but it is considered inappropriate for more advanced players. In the illustration, the triangled white stones are said to be in atari, because black can capture them in a single move. If black plays a move at a, the white pieces are immediately captured and removed from the board.

In Japanese, atari (Japanese: 当たり, あたり, or アタリ) is the nominalized form of ataru (当たる, あたる, or アタル), meaning 'to hit the target' or 'to receive something fortuitously'. The word atari is used in Japanese when a prediction comes true or when someone wins a lottery. In Chinese ta chi'ih (Chinese: 打, 打吃 or 叫吃; pinyin: dǎ, dǎ chī or jiào chī; Wade–Giles: ta^{3}, ta^{3} ch'ih^{1} or chiao^{4} ch'ih^{1}); Korean: dansu (단수) or sometimes adali (아다리).

=== Board positions ===
Go board, 19 by 19. Marks: letter B at K10; letter A at Q10; letter G at Q6; letter I at R6; letter C at P5; letter F at Q5; letter H at R5; letter A at Q4; letter E at R4; letter D at R3.BAGICFHAED
a – hoshi; b – tengen; c – go no go; d – san san; e – komoku; f – takamoku; g – ōtakamoku; h – mokuhazushi; i – ōmokuhazushi

As the distance of a stone from the edge of the board has important tactical and strategic implications, it is normal to term the corner points of the board (1, 1) points, and count lines in from the edge.

- Star point (Japanese: 星, hoshi; Chinese: 星, 星位; pinyin: xīng, xīng wèi; Wade–Giles: hsing^{1}, hsing^{1} wei^{4}): an intersection traditionally marked with a small dot on the board. These are either
  - a) (4, 4) point in an empty corner, or
  - a) (4, 10) or (10, 4) point on one of the sides
- b) Origin of heaven (天元, tengen): the center of the board, located at (10, 10).
- c) Five by five (五の五, go no go): a (5, 5) point in a corner.
- d) Three by three (三々, san san): a (3, 3) point in a corner.
- e) Small point (小目, komoku): a (4, 3) or (3, 4) point in a corner.
- f) High point (高目, takamoku): a (5, 4) or (4, 5) point in a corner.
- g) Large high point (大高目, ōtakamoku): a (6, 4) or (4, 6) point in a corner.
- h) Outside point (目外し, mokuhazushi): a (5, 3) or (3, 5) point in a corner.
- i) Outside the large point (大目外し, ōmokuhazushi): a (6, 3) or (3, 6) point in a corner.

=== Dame ===
Dame (English pronunciation: /ˈdɑːmeɪ/ DAH-may; Japanese: 駄目; Chinese: 單官; pinyin: dan1 guan1; Wade–Giles: tan^{1} kuan^{1}) are unfilled neutral points that will not benefit either side. Typically, the term refers to vacant points that lie between two opposing forces, and will eventually be filled without altering the score. Basically, dame points are of no interest, though they must be filled before counting the score under area (Chinese style) scoring. The Japanese rules define a dame as a vacant point that is not surrounded by live stones of only one color, so the term can also refer to an empty point that is tactically useful as a liberty for a unit.

=== Divine move ===
A divine move is an exceptional, inspired and original move; one that is non-obvious and which balances strategy and tactics to create an unexpected turning point in a game. A divine move is singular; it is of such rarity that a professional Go player might reasonably hope to play a single such move in a lifetime. The term comes from the Japanese phrase kami no Itte (神の一手), meaning 'move of God' or 'Godly move'.

The famous ear-reddening move played by Hon'inbō Shūsaku in 1846 is sometimes considered to be an example of a divine move. A widely cited modern example is Lee Sedol’s move 78 in the fourth game of his 2016 challenge match against AlphaGo, a computer Go program developed by DeepMind, which was first described by Gu Li (9p) and later widely accepted by top professionals as a “divine move” for its originality and its reversal of a position widely regarded at the time as lost, ultimately leading to Lee’s victory in that game, his only win in the five-game match, and the last time a human defeated a top-level AI in standard Go match play.

=== Double hane ===
Go board, 11 by 7. Moves: 1 black E9; 2 white C8; 3 black D7; 4 white C7; 5 black D6; 6 white C5; 7 black D5; 8 white C4; 9 black D4; 10 white D3; 11 black E3; 12 white E2.010204030506070809101112
In this joseki, white plays double hane with 10 and 12.

The double hane (二段バネ, ni-dan bane) is a sequence of two moves in succession that step around an opponent's adjacent group. It can be an aggressive and appropriate way to play, although it exposes the stones to cutting.

=== Eyes ===
Go board, 5 by 5. Black stones: D5, C4, E4, C3, D3, E3. White stones: B5, C5, B4, B3, B2, C2, D2, E2. Marks: circle at E5; circle at D4.
The black group has two eyes and cannot be captured.

Eyes (Japanese: 眼, Hepburn: me) are internal, fully surrounded liberties of a group of stones. An eye cannot be filled by the opponent until all of the group's other liberties have been filled.

The presence or absence of eyes in a group determine life or death of that group: A group with one or no eyes will die unless its owner can develop them; conversely, a group with two or more eyes will live since an opponent can never reduce the group down to a single liberty.

Eyes are counted as occupied territory of the group that fully surrounds the eye. When a group shares (is adjacent to) one or more eyes with the opposing player's groups, those eyes do not count as territory for either player. Sometimes those eyes are reduced to dame as other areas of the board change to give one or both groups additional eyes, allowing one or both players to fill the shared eyes. But sometimes those shared eyes do not resolve.

=== Gote ===
Playing gote (後手, lit. 'after hand' or 'later move') means responding directly to the opponent's sente move.

=== Hane ===
Go board, 5 by 5. Black stones: C3, C2. White stones: C4, A3, B3. Moves: 1 black D4.1
A hane

A hane (Japanese: 跳ね, lit. 'jump'; Chinese: 扳; pinyin: bān; Wade–Giles: pan^{1}; lit. 'pull') is a move that goes around one or more of the opponent's stones.

=== Hayago ===
Hayago (早碁) means 'quick Go', 'fast Go' or 'quick play'. Most hayago games last either five minutes, with ten seconds allotted for each move, or ten minutes, with thirty seconds per move.

=== Jigo ===
A jigo (持碁) is a tied score, i.e., the players have an equal number of points at the conclusion of the game. Jigo can be avoided by adding a fractional komi to white's score.

=== Joseki ===
Joseki (定石, jōseki; lit. 'established stones') are established sequences of play which (locally speaking) are considered to give an optimal result (balanced exchanges and/or equal territories/influences) to both players. There are thousands of such lines that have been researched and documented.

Often joseki are played out early in the game and involve dividing the corners. There are also "mid-game joseki", dealing with for example an invasion into a common enclosure or framework.

Though joseki have some parallel with chess openings, they differ significantly. Chess openings structure the whole board while joseki deal only with a local position. Therefore, the choice of which joseki (of many possible) to play in any given situation should be based on an assessment of the global position. This includes considerations of the direction of play, current balance of territory and influence, and one's own game strategy.

It is also quite possible to deviate from joseki and obtain a good result if the surrounding position allows. In other words, joseki are sensitive to the context in which they are played.

=== Kakari ===
Go board, 11 by 7. White stones: D9. Moves: 1 black C7. Marks: letter A at D7.1A
Black plays a low kakari at 1 or a high kakari at a.

A kakari (掛かり, カカリ) is an approach move to a corner position, such as at the 5-3 point (low kakari) or the 5-4 point (high kakari) when an opponent has previously played the 3-4 point, as in the diagram. More generally a kakari is low if it is played on the third line and high if it played on the fourth line. Kakaris higher than the fourth line are uncommon in professional play.

=== Keima ===
Go board, 5 by 5. Black stones: D3, B2.
The keima shape

A keima (桂馬, ケイマ), also called a 'knight's move', is a stone placement which makes an 'L' shape.

The term comes from the Japanese name of the knight piece in shogi (Japanese chess), which is the equivalent of the knight in Western chess. Both pieces move in a similar shape to the keima shape in Go.

=== Kiai ===
Kiai (気合い) translates as 'fighting spirit', meaning play that is aggressive or where the player takes the initiative. Kiai typically means keeping sente and not letting the opponent have his or her way. A sensei might say, "You play too passively — put some kiai in your moves!” Kiai moves can surprise an opponent and turn the game around. Examples of kiai include defending with a move that also counter-attacks or answering a kikashi (forcing move) in an unexpected way. Kiai is also a term used in Japanese martial arts, usually as a name for a loud yell accompanying an attack.

=== Kikashi ===
Literally meaning 'an enlivenment', kikashi (利かし) is a forcing move, usually one made outside the primary flow of play. Unlike sente, though, a move is kikashi when it yields a high efficiency in play by forcing the opponent to abandon a course of action. A kikashi stone will usually be sacrificed while conferring an advantage; for example, the kikashi stone could act as a ladder breaker or destroy the opponent's potential eyeshape, while the answering move has no value at all.
Moves can be kikashi, or not, depending on whether they are answered with appropriate sophistication or not. If the answering move strengthens the position, then the play is not kikashi but aji keshi (ruining one's own potential).

=== Ko ===
Go board, 5 by 5. Black stones: B4, A3, B2. White stones: C4, D3, C2. Moves: 1 black C3. Marks: circle at B3.1
A situation involving ko

Ko (English pronunciation: /koʊ/; Japanese: 劫, コウ, romanized: kō; Chinese: 打劫) refers to a situation where the ko rule applies. The ko rule states that a move cannot be played such that it causes the board to look exactly the same as it did at the end of the player's last move. Consequently, if a player captures a single stone, the opponent cannot respond immediately by capturing the stone the player used to make the original capture. This would make the board look as it did immediately prior—a situation that could repeat indefinitely.

A player may take advantage of the ko rule by playing a move with the knowledge that the opponent will not be permitted to recapture immediately. The opponent, however, may play a sente move elsewhere forcing the player to respond, in which case the opponent may then recapture the ko. Such a sente play is referred to as a ko threat. This kind of repeated back and forth sequence of ko capture, ko threat, response to ko threat, ko re-capture, etc., is known as a ko fight.

Ko (Sanskrit: kalpa) is originally a Buddhist term meaning aeon, or an extremely long length of time.

=== Komi ===
Komi (込み, コミ) is a bonus in score given to white as compensation for going second. There is no agreement on what Komi should be, but is commonly in the range of 4.5 to 7.5 points. Komi almost always includes a half point for breaking ties.

=== Korigatachi ===
Korigatachi (凝り形) is often translated as 'over-concentrated', but more literally is 'congealed shape'. If a player uses his stones in an inefficient way, the result will be korigatachi. Knowing something about this problem should tell one how to avoid it. Placing stones too close together is a fundamental mistake, rather than safe play.

=== Kosumi ===
Go board, 9 by 9. Moves: 1 black C6; 2 white E7; 3 black D5.213
In this 3-4 point joseki, black plays kosumi at 3.

The kosumi (尖み, コスミ) is a move placed at a point diagonally adjacent to another of one's own stones where the adjoining intersections are unoccupied.

=== Ladder ===
A ladder (四丁, シチョウ, shichō) is a sequence of moves in which an attacker pursues a group in atari in a zig-zag pattern across the board.

=== Liberty ===
Go board, 9 by 9. Black stones: G9, C7, F5, G5, G4, A2, B2, B1, J1. Marks: circle at F9; circle at H9; circle at C8; circle at G8; circle at B7; circle at D7; circle at C6; circle at F6; circle at G6; circle at E5; circle at H5; circle at F4; circle at H4; circle at A3; circle at B3; circle at G3; circle at C2; circle at J2; circle at A1; circle at C1; circle at H1.
Groups and their liberties (marked by circles)

A liberty (Japanese: 呼吸点, Hepburn: kokyūten; lit. 'breathing point'; Chinese: qì 氣) is a vacant point that is immediately adjacent to a stone in a cardinal (orthogonal) direction, or connected through a continuous string of same-colored stones to such a point. A stone, chain, or group must have at least one liberty to survive. A group that has two or more separate internal liberties (eyes) is impossible to capture.

=== Miai ===
Go board, 5 by 5. Black stones: B5, C5, B4, B3, B2, B1, C1, D1, E1. White stones: D5, C4, D4, C3, C2, D2, E2. Marks: rA tile at E4; rB tile at E3.rArB
a and b are miai.

Miai (Japanese: 見合い; Korean: 맞보기) are a pair of vacant points on the board that are equivalent in value. For example, if Black plays at A, White can play at B and suffer no disadvantage from the exchange.

This occurs often. Miai can be seen in the fuseki stage on a large scale, or in a simple life and death problem, such as a straight four-space eye. This shape is alive because of its two central points a and b: if Black plays a, White can answer with b and vice versa.

The term originates from the Japanese custom of arranging marriage through a series of meetings (miai) to view prospective spouses (見る miru, "view", 合う au, "meet").

=== Monkey jump ===
Go board, 5 by 5. Black stones: B5, C5, D5, B4, B3, B2, B1. White stones: C4, C3, C2, C1. Moves: 1 black E2. Marks: triangle on black stone at D5.△1
Monkey jump

A monkey jump is a move, usually used in the end-game, which can reduce one's opponent's territory significantly. It can be played when the attacker has a strong stone on the second line and the defender has no nearby stones on the first or second line guarding his hoped-for territory. The attacker places a stone on the first line three spaces into the defender's territory from the strong stone. Due to the special properties of the edge of the board, the defender cannot usually cut off the stone.

=== Moyo ===
Moyō (模様) is a framework for potential territory which usually consists of unconnected stones with some distance between them. The early game usually consists of competing for moyo by attempting to expand one's own and/or invade or reduce one's opponent's. The term literally means 'pattern', but in Go it is often translated as 'framework', 'potential' or 'wall'.

=== Myoushu ===
Myoushu (妙手, myōshu) is an inspired move—a move which turns a game around or otherwise exceeds expectations. An example of myoushu is the ear-reddening move played by Honinbo Shusaku in 1846.

=== Nakade ===
Go board, 5 by 5. Black stones: D4, E4, C3, D3, C2, C1. White stones: C5, D5, E5, B4, C4, B3, B2, B1. Moves: 1 white E2.1
Nakade

A nakade (中手, lit. 'inside move') refers to a move inside an opponent's group that prevents the opponent from making two eyes. It can also refer to a group of stones or a shape where such a move could be played. The illustration shows a nakade often referred to as bulky five or chair shape.

=== Nerai ===
Nerai (狙い) is a Japanese Go term (noun, from the verb nerau) meaning threat, aim, target, follow-up.

=== Peep ===
Go board, 11 by 7. Black stones: C9, C8, B7, B6, B5. White stones: D9, D8, C7, C6, C5, C4. Moves: 1 black E7.1
A peep

A peep is a move normally played in sente in which a stone is placed directly next to an empty point that would connect two groups. The move typically provokes an immediate response, since it threatens to separate the two groups.

=== Pincer ===
Go board, 11 by 7. Black stones: D7. White stones: D9. Moves: 1 white D4. Marks: triangle on black stone at D7.△1
White plays a pincer against the marked black stone.

A pincer is a move that approaches an opponent's stone from both sides. The purpose of the attack is to diminish the opponent's ability to form a base or occupy a territory on the side.

=== Probe ===
A probe is a sophisticated move designed to yield information about the opponent's intentions based on how they respond. The Japanese term for a probing move is yosu-miru (様子見る). The phrase yōsu o miru literally means 'to see how things stand'. A probe draws on other concepts such as kikashi, aji, and korigatachi.

=== Sabaki ===
Sabaki (捌き) is the development of a flexible, efficient position that is difficult for the opponent to attack, often by means of contact plays and sacrifice.

=== Seki ===
Go board, 9 by 9. Black stones: F7, G7, H7, J7, F6, F5, H5, F4, J4, F3, J3, G2, F1, G1, H1, J1. White stones: G6, H6, J6, G5, G4, G3, H3, H2, J2. Marks: rA tile at J5; letter A at H4.rAA
A seki

Seki (関, セキ) is a Japanese term for an impasse that cannot be resolved into simple life and death. It is sometimes translated as "mutual life" (Chinese: 雙活; pinyin: shuāng huó). For example, a capturing race may end in a position in which neither player can capture the other. There are numerous types of seki positions that can arise, characterized as cases in which neither player adds a play to groups that do not have two eyes. The area remains untouched; at the end all groups involved are deemed alive, but no points are scored for territory.

In the seki figure, if either White or Black play on the points marked a, the other will effect capture immediately and will be able (if playing properly) to form two eyes.

=== Sente ===
Playing sente (先手, lit. 'before hand' or 'earlier move') means to have the initiative.

=== Shape ===
Shape is the configuration of stones in their flexibility and efficiency at staying connected, forming eyes, and maintaining liberties. Stones are said to have good shape if they are efficient and flexible and bad shape if they are inefficient. Examples of good shape are the ponnuki (four stones in a diamond created by capturing an enemy stone) and the bamboo joint (a 2×3 pattern of two stones, two spaces and two more stones). Examples of bad shape are the empty triangle (three adjacent stones forming an 'L') and the dango (meaning 'dumpling', a large clump of stones not containing any eyes).

=== Shoulder hit ===
Go board, 11 by 7. Black stones: C9, D8, D6, C3. White stones: D10, F9. Moves: 1 white D2.1
Shoulder hit

A shoulder hit is a stone placed diagonally next to an opponent's stone, often towards the center of the board. It is generally used to reduce the territorial potential of an opponent's group without being easily captured.

=== Tenuki ===
To play tenuki (手抜き) is to ignore an opponent's sente move in order to play elsewhere.

=== Tesuji ===
A tesuji (手筋) is a clever play, the best play in a local position, a skillful move. Tesuji is derived from suji (筋), which means 'line of play'.

The opposite of tesuji is zokusuji, which can be translated as 'crude line of play', and also referred to as anti-suji or a vulgar move depending on the situation.

Tesuji often require a player to read a situation several moves ahead. They may be applied in life and death situations (as found in tsumego), in order to obtain initiative (sente), to capture stones, to gain extra points in the end game (yose), or otherwise to salvage a seemingly unfavorable situation.

=== Thickness ===
Go board, 9 by 9. Black stones: C7, D7, E7, F6, G6, H5, G4. White stones: D8, E8, F7, G7, H7, H6.
Black's position is thick.

Thickness (厚み, atsumi) describes a position of power and impregnability. A group is thick when it has developed beyond the level of stability in its local area without accruing significant weaknesses, and consequently projects power at a distance, especially over vacant or unsettled areas of the board. Such positions have a profound influence on the flow of the game. In the diagram, though white has about 10 points of territory in the corner while black has little or none, black can expect the power projected outward by his thick position to more than make up for this. Note that black's advantage would not be as significant if white had a settled position in the direction black's influence is facing.

=== Yose ===
Yose (寄せ, ヨセ) is a term for endgame plays. A yose translates as a 'tightening play', i.e., a play on the board that consolidates territory or destroys the opponent's territory. It also refers to the endgame phase.

A fundamental skill in the endgame is the ability to evaluate plays in different areas of the board and identify which plays have priority. This usually requires determining the number of points at stake (known as counting). Knowledge of counting begins with some simple examples and heuristics. Combinatorial game theory has been implicated in gaining actual proofs rather than practical ways to win positions.

Ōyose, or large yose refers to a position that is large enough to be hard to count with precision (say, 20 points or more). It may also be used to refer to the early endgame phase.

== Use in popular culture ==
The name of the video game company Atari came from the term used while playing the game because co-founder Nolan Bushnell was a fan of the game. Sente Technologies and Tengen also derive their names from Go terms.

== See also ==
- Rules of Go
