= Kamakura jubango =

20th century Go match in Japan

The Kamakura jubango (十番碁, ten-match game) was a historically significant go match played in Japan in 1939, 1940 and 1941. It pitted Kitani Minoru and Go Seigen, close rivals for a decade and friends at a personal level, and both ranked 7 dan, against each other.

Go Seigen emerged victorious by a 6–4 margin. This match marked the beginning of the period of his dominance as the top player, which continued until the First Meijin Tournament in 1962.

== Background ==
Nine months before the match started, Kitani had defeated Honinbo Shusai, the Meijin, in Shusai's retirement game. The Honinbo title was to be open to competition, and both Kitani and Go took part in that tournament. Each failed to get through to the final match, which was contested by Sekiyama Riichi and Shin Kato, with Sekiyama becoming the first Honinbo under the titleholder system in 1941. The preliminaries of this first Honinbo tournament were under way during the Kamakura match. With wartime conditions, the pace of all competitions slowed considerably. All these players also took part in the Oteai competition. The first 9 dan to emerge from the Oteai was Fujisawa Kuranosuke, some years later (at this time 6 dan). At the time, it was hard to receive promotion even to 8 dan. The pool of top players was rather small; Karigane Junichi was 8 dan but had stayed outside the system that had established itself around Shusai and the Nihon Ki-in.

The result of the match was the first step in the process by which Go Seigen would establish ascendancy over his rivals (except Sekiyama, who withdrew from competition because of bad health). He was promoted to 8 dan in spring 1942. Having taken on Kitani, against whom he had an unfinished jubango stopped at 3–3 in 1933 when Kitani was promoted, Go took on both Karigane and Fujisawa (whom he played in the end in three long matches), and then the new Honinbos Hashimoto Utaro and Iwamoto Kaoru. Go Seigen played again in the Honinbo tournament, but not after 1945. In later years various challenges allowed him to face the Honinbo of the time.

== The games ==
Apart from game 2, played in Shiba Park in Tokyo, and game 5 played in Gunma Prefecture, the match was held in various locations actually in Kamakura. The first game was in the Buddhist temple Kenchō-ji. Game 3 was in Engaku-ji, as were games 4, 6 and 9. The games 7, 8 and 10 were in the Hachiman Shinto shrine in Kamakura.

The starting conditions of the match were tagaisen; since the players were of equal rank: colours alternated, with Kitani winning the nigiri. There was no komidashi. Largely unexpectedly, Kitani went 1–5 down over the first six games, and so was subject to beating down. The final four games, beginning 29 December 1940, were therefore played at sen-ai-sen, with Kitani taking Black twice, White, then Black. Of those final games, Go Seigen could win only the second, so that with a net score of 4–6 and a win with White Kitani had salvaged some of his reputation.

== Sponsorship ==
The match was sponsored by the Yomiuri Shimbun.
