= 52nd Okan =

The 52nd Okan began on 16 December 2010. The winner of the challenger tournament will face last years Okan champion Yamashiro Hiroshi.

== Tournament ==
Round of 16
10 March
Yanigisawa Satoshi	0
Hane Yasumasa	1
Ogata Masaki	BYE
10 February
Nakane Naoyuki	1
Katayama Yasuo	0
Imamura Yoshiaki	BYE
16 December
Matsuoka Hideki	0
Yoshioka Kaoru	1
Nakano Hironari	BYE
0
6 January
Shida Tatsuya	1
Shimojima Yohei	0
Hane Naoki	BYE
0

Quarter-finals
Hane Yasumasa
Ogata Masaki
2 June
Nakane Naoyuki	1
Imamaura Yoshiaki	0
7 April
Yoshioka Kaoru	0
Nakano Hironari	1
21 April
Shida Tatsuya	0
Hane Naoki	1

Semi-finals
Nakane Naoyuki
Nakano Hironari
Hane Naoki

Final

== Final ==
Player	1	T
Yamashiro Hiroshi (Okan)		
(Challenger)		
