= Hon'inbō Shūsaku =

Japanese professional Go player (1829–1862)

Honinbo Shusaku
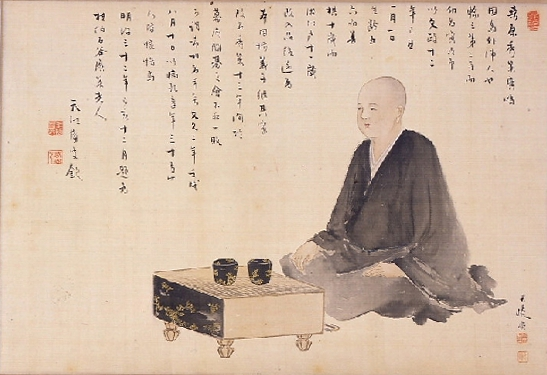

Personal information
- Native name: 本因坊秀策 (Japanese)
- Full name: Hon′inbō Shūsaku
- Born: June 6, 1829 Innoshima, Bingo Province, Japan
- Died: September 3, 1862 (aged 33) Edo, Japan

Sport
- Teacher: Honinbo Shuwa
- Rank: 7 dan pro

Shusaku (本因坊秀策, Yasuda Eisai, Kuwahara Shusaku, Invincible Shusaku, born Kuwabara Torajiro (桑原虎次郎); June 6, 1829 – September 3, 1862) was a Japanese professional Go player during the 19th century. He is known for his undefeated streak of 19 games during the annual castle games; his thirty-game match with Ota Yuzo; the eponymous Shusaku opening; and his posthumous veneration as a "Go sage". Next to his teacher, Hon'inbō Shūwa, he is considered to have been the strongest player from 1847/8 to his death in 1862. He was nicknamed Invincible Shusaku because of his castle games performance.

== Biography ==
He was nicknamed "Invincible" after he earned a perfect score for 19 straight wins in the annual castle games. Some say that he was not stronger than his teacher, Honinbō Shuwa. Out of respect for his teacher, Shusaku refused to play with white against his teacher thus there is no clear gauge of the difference in strength between them. Shusaku, for example, had a plus score against Ōta Yūzo but still found him a tough opponent, while Shuwa beat him easily.

Only two other people have been given the title "Go Sage" (Kisei) in addition to Shusaku, the others being Honinbō Dosaku (1645–1702) and Honinbo Jowa (1787–1847). However, Jowa's title was posthumously revoked due to a biased account of his machinations (in the Zain Danso) towards obtaining the post of Meijin Godokoro. Today, Shusaku's reputation is more balanced in Japan, where a wide number of texts on Shusaku and Jowa have since been published, but remains somewhat inflated in the West where the sources are more sparse.

=== Early years ===
He was born on the island of Innoshima near the town of Onomichi, Hiroshima Prefecture, Japan to a merchant, Kuwabara Wazo. Asano Tadahiro, lord of Mihara Castle, became his patron after playing a game with him, and allowed him to study under Lord Asano's personal trainer, the priest Hoshin, a player of professional level.

In 1837, at age 8, Shusaku was already almost a player of professional caliber. He left home to join the Honinbō school (the most important institute in the game of Go in Japan at the time having produced the Go Saint Dosaku and many Meijins) officially as a student of Honinbo Jowa but his study would mainly be with senior students. On January 3, 1840, he received his shodan (first dan) professional diploma.

Go board, 19 by 19. Black stones: K19, D18, K18, R18, F17, K17, L17, Q17, M16, N16, O16, R16, F15, L15, Q15, R15, Q14, R13, S13, T13, P12, T12, K11, N11, Q11, R11, S11, P10, R10, Q9, R9, Q8, S8, Q7, K6, M6, Q6, G5, M5, O5, Q5, C4, E4, H4, M4, P4, F3, H3, N3, O3, P3, Q3, G2, O2, P2, R2, O1, Q1, S1. White stones: L19, M19, L18, N18, P18, Q18, C17, D17, J17, M17, N17, P17, C14, R14, S14, O13, P13, Q13, Q12, R12, S12, O11, P11, N10, O10, S10, C9, P9, S9, P8, R8, N7, P7, R7, S7, C6, N6, P6, J5, N5, P5, R5, N4, O4, Q4, R4, G3, J3, L3, M3, R3, S3, H2, K2, L2, N2, S2, J1, M1. Marks: triangle on black stone at K11.△
The "ear-reddening" move

=== Meteoric rise ===
In 1840 Shusaku left Edo and returned to his home for a period of over a year. In the following years, he made steady progress up the ranks, reaching 4 dan in 1844, after which he again returned home for a prolonged period. In April–May 1846, returning to Edo, he played against Gennan Inseki, arguably the strongest player of that time. Shusaku played with a handicap of two stones, but Gennan found that Shusaku was too strong, so he called off the game. A new game was started with Shusaku just playing black, the ear-reddening game. Gennan played a new joseki (opening variation in a corner), and Shusaku erred in responding. He fought back hard, but still by the time of the middlegame, all the people watching the game thought Gennan was winning, except for one, a doctor. He admitted that he was not skilled in Go, but noticed that Gennan's ears became red after a certain move by Shusaku, a sign that Gennan was surprised. In the end, Shusaku won the game by two points.

Returning to Edo, Shusaku was not only promoted to 5-dan, but he was also made the official heir of Honinbo Shuwa, who was to become the head of the Honinbo house. Shusaku declined at first, citing his obligations to Lord Asano as the reason. After that issue was settled, Shusaku accepted. As the official heir to the head of the Honinbo house, Shusaku had an eminent position. His grade also increased, he finally reached 7-dan, although it is not known exactly when—some think in 1849 while others say in 1853. After forcing his main rival and friend Ōta Yūzo to take a handicap, he was generally accepted to be the strongest player with the exception of Shuwa.

=== Sanjubango ===
In 1853, a group of players gathered in a mansion in Edo. The players were Yasui Sanchi, Ito Showa, Sakaguchi Sentoku, Hattori Seitetsu, and Ōta Yūzo. They were discussing Shusaku, to the point where they had come to the idea that Shusaku was the strongest player of the time, but Ota did not agree. He said he was in the middle of a series of games with Shusaku, tied at 3 apiece. Akai Gorosaku, who was a famous sponsor of Go during the time, had heard this and decided to sponsor an unheard of 30-game go competition (a Sanjubango) between Ota and Shusaku. The series had begun in 1853, when Ota was 46 and a 7 dan, while Shusaku was 24 years old and a 6 dan. The games were played once a week, faster than a typical 10-game match. Ota was doing well until the 11th game, when Shusaku started to fight back. Ota was behind by 4 games after the 17th game. The 21st game was played in July, but the 22nd game was not played until October of that year, a reason of which is not known. The 22nd game was played in Ota's house, which was different from the others, considering they were played in more neutral venues. Ota had lost once more, and the venue was changed to a more neutral one. It is believed, however, the 23rd game, was fixed. It had lasted almost 24 straight hours, and had resulted in a tie. It saved Ota from embarrassment. It was thought as a great achievement, having a tie after taking white, so much that it was used, along with Shusaku's calling up for the castle games, as an excuse to adjourn the match.

=== Death and legacy ===
In 1862, a cholera epidemic swept through Japan. Shusaku tended the patients within the Honinbō house, and fell ill himself, dying of it on September 3 at the age of 33.

Shusaku's name is connected to the Shusaku fuseki, a certain method of opening the game on black, which was developed to perfection (but not invented) by him, and was the basis of the popular opening style up to the 1930s.

Shusaku is also remembered by the Shusaku number, an equivalent of the Erdős number for Go players.

On 6 June 2014, a Google doodle commemorated Shusaku's 185th birthday. This caused controversy in the United Kingdom, as it was felt that preempting the 70th anniversary of the Normandy landings to honour a Japanese person was impolitic. Google.uk was hurriedly amended.

== Fiction ==
In the manga and anime series Hikaru no Go, Shusaku discovered the spirit of fictional Go player Fujiwara-no-Sai. Shusaku became the medium through which Sai played the great games ascribed to Shusaku.
