= 1st Honinbo =

Go Tournament

The 1st Honinbo was the first ever professional Go tournament. Eight players competed for the title. The tournament utilized a makeshift league system where players would play four knockout rounds. At the end of each round, the winning player would receive six points. The runner-up would receive five, and the losing semi-finalists would have a playoff to decide who finished in third (four points) and fourth (three points). Players knocked out in the first round received one point.

White received 4.5 komi during the knockout rounds and players had 13 hours thinking time. Tamejiro Suzuki, however, was granted 16 hours thinking time because of his disdain for time limits. At the conclusion of the fourth knockout round, the two top players in the standings, Riichi Sekiyama and Shin Kato, played a six-game series to decide the winner. The initial series finished even at three games, but Sekiyama was given the title for having accumulated more points in the knockout rounds.

== Tournament ==
=== First knockout round ===
Quarter-finals
Tamejiro Suzuki | 0
Go Seigen | 1
Katsukiyo Kubomatsu | 0
Nobuaki Maeda | 1
Kensaku Segoe | 0
Riichi Sekiyama | 1
Shin Kato | 1
Minoru Kitani | 0

Semi-finals
Go Seigen | 1
Nobuaki Maeda | 0
Riichi Sekiyama | 1
Shin Kato | 0

Final
Go Seigen | 1
Riichi Sekiyama | 0
Third place
Maeda Nobuaki | 0
Shin Kato | 1

=== Second knockout round ===
Quarter-finals
Katsukiyo Kubomatsu | 0
Shin Kato | 1
Kensaku Segoe | 0
Tamejiro Suzuki | 1
Nobuaki Maeda | 1
Go Seigen | 0
Minoru Kitani | 0
Riichi Sekiyama | 1

Semi-finals
Shin Kato | 1
Tamejiro Suzuki | 1
Nobuaki Maeda | 0
Riichi Sekiyama | 1

Final
Shin Kato | 0
Riichi Sekiyama | 1
Third place
Tamejiro Suzuki | 0
Nobuaki Maeda | 1

=== Third knockout round ===
Quarter-finals
Tamejiro Suzuki | 0
Minoru Kitani | 1
Shin Kato | 1
Go Seigen | 0
Nobuaki Maeda | 1
Kensaku Segoe | 0
Katsukiyo Kubomatsu | 1
Riichi Sekiyama | 0

Semi-finals
Minoru Kitani | 1
Shin Kato | 0
Nobuaki Maeda | 1
Katsukiyo Kubomatsu | 0

Final
Minoru Kitani | 1
Nobuaki Maeda | 0
Third place
Shin Kato | 0
Katsukiyo Kubomatsu | 1

=== Fourth knockout round ===
Quarter-finals
Riichi Sekiyama | 1
Nobuaki Maeda | 0
Go Seigen | 1
Minoru Kitani | 0
Tamejiro Suzuki | 0
Shin Kato | 1
Katsukiyo Kubomatsu | 0
Kensaku Segoe | 1

Semi-finals
Riichi Sekiyama | 0
Go Seigen | 1
Shin Kato | 0
Kensaku Segoe | 1

Final
Go Seigen | 1
Kensaku Segoe | 0
Third place
Riichi Sekiyama | 1
Shin Kato | 0

== Final standings ==
| Pos. | Player | Pts. |
|---|---|---|
| 1 | Riichi Sekiyama | 16 |
| 2 | Shin Kato | 15 |
| 3 | Go Seigen | 14 |
| 4 | Nobuaki Maeda | 13 |
| 5 | Minoru Kitani | 9 |
| 6 | Kensaku Segoe | 8 |
| 7 | Katsukiyo Kubomatsu | 7 |
| 8 | Tamejiro Suzuki | 6 |
