= 2nd Honinbo =

The 2nd Honinbo took place in 1943, two years after the first edition. The previous winner was Riichi Sekiyama, who was to face the winner of a four player league to decide the winner of the tournament. Utaro Hashimoto won the league and the first two games of the final, but Sekiyama had to forfeit the rest of the series after falling ill.

== League standings ==
Player	M.K.	S.K.	U.H.	M.S.	Record	Notes
Minoru Kitani	–	B+R	X	W+1.5	2–1	
Shin Kato	X	–	X	X	0–3	
Utaro Hashimoto	W+3.5	W+R	–	B+R	3–0	Challenger
Masami Shinohara	X	B+R	X	–	1–2	

== Finals ==
Player	1	2	Total
Riichi Sekiyama (Honinbo Risen)			0
Utaro Hashimoto (Challenger)	B+R	W+R	2
