= Hon'inbō Dōetsu =

Japanese Go player

Personal information
- Native name: 本因坊道悦 (Japanese)
- Full name: Hon'inbō Dōetsu
- Born: 1636 Japan
- Died: 1727 (aged 90–91) Japan

Sport
- Teacher: Hon'inbō Sanetsu
- Rank: 8 dan

Hon'inbō Dōetsu (本因坊道悦, 1636–1727) was a Japanese professional go player, who became the third head of the Honinbo house. His surname was Niwa, and he used a Buddhist name Nissho.

== Biography ==
He was born in Matsuzaka, currently in Mie Prefecture. He was adopted as Hon'inbō heir in 1658. He was promoted to 7 dan in 1666. His final ranking was as 8 dan.

Dōetsu challenged Yasui Sanchi to a long match. In the end 20 games were played, out of a theoretical 60, over seven years starting in 1668. Under the beating-down rules (see jubango) he forced Yasui down from sen (Black in each game, for a theoretical difference of two levels) to sen-ai-sen (Black-White-Black).

He was also active in oshirogo from 1660, for 15 years. In 1677 he stepped down as Honinbo head, handing over to Dōsaku. He did however still meet an official requirement to play oshirogo; he was given a personal allowance of 20 koku of rice. He is given the credit for establishing standard dimensions for go equipment.

Preceded by Hon'inbō San'etsu	Hon'inbō; 1658–1677	Succeeded by Hon'inbō Dōsaku

== Sources ==
- GoGod Encyclopedia
