= Hon'inbō Sansa =

Japanese Go player (1559–1623)

Honinbo Sansa
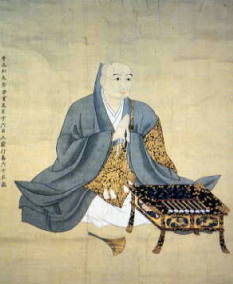

Personal information
- Native name: 本因坊算砂 (Japanese)
- Full name: Honinbo Sansa
- Born: 1559 Kyoto, Japan
- Died: June 13, 1623 (aged 63–64) Edo, Japan

Sport
- Teacher: Senya
- Rank: 9 dan

Hon'inbō Sansa (本因坊 算砂; 1559 – June 13, 1623) was the assumed name of Kanō Yosaburō (加納 與三郎), one of the strongest Japanese Go players of the Edo period (1603–1867), and founder of the house of Hon'inbō, first among the four great schools of Go in Japan. He was a Buddhist priest of the Nichiren sect, and his original dharma name was Nikkai (日海).

== Life and career ==
Nikkai was born in Kyōto and became a monk at age nine. The name "Hon'inbō", (originally pronounced "Honninbō"), comes from a sub-temple of the Jakkōji temple complex in Kyōto where Nikkai, the first "Hon'inbō", resided.

Among his students were the daimyōs Oda Nobunaga, Toyotomi Hideyoshi, and Tokugawa Ieyasu, the three great "unifiers" of feudal Japan. Nikkai considered the three generals to be "fifth-degree" players (五子, comparable to amateur 4 or 5 dan), but "diplomacy" was likely a factor in Nikkai's even-handed assessment of these imposing figures.

It was Nobunaga who, in 1578, recognized twenty-year-old Nikkai as the first Meijin of Go. In 1582, Nikkai, at the behest of Nobunaga, was involved in a notorious game at the Honnōji Temple against his rival, another Nichiren priest, Kashio Rigen (鹿塩 利玄 b. 1565). (Apparently, there is a theory that "Kashio" and "Rigen" were two different people. See the Japanese version of this article.) The game is traditionally held to have taken place on the eve of the treacherous Incident at Honnōji, (in which Nobunaga was forced to commit seppuku), and is said to have ended in a "triple ko". Hence the notion of triple ko as bad omen. There is a go game record, but typical for the period, it is incomplete. The triple ko may have occurred, somewhat implausibly, in unrecorded remaining plays, or in another game that day, but in the end, there is no evidence that this is more than a good story.

In 1587, Nobunaga's successor, the regent (kampaku) Hideyoshi gave Nikkai an official position, (forerunner to the office of Go-dokoro), granting his temple an annual four koku of rice and setting up a tournament that he attended in person. In 1592, Nikkai was given the rank of Gon-no-Daisoku by the Go-Yōzei Emperor.

In 1603, the Go-Yōzei Emperor recognized sixty-year-old Tokugawa Ieyasu as shōgun, inaugurating the 250-year rule of the Tokugawa bakufu. At the direction of Ieyasu, Nikkai turned priestly duties at Jakkoji over to his younger brother Nichiei and became the first go-dokoro, in which office Nikkai was provided fifty koku of rice and five servants. Also around this time (c. 1605), Nikkai took the name Hon'inbō Sansa (Sansa written 算砂: the characters for "calculating" and "sand").

Sansa was also a strong shogi player, but in the Tokugawa period, go was organised into four "houses" (or "academies"), and shogi into three, which would compete in oshirogo "Castle Go" (and "Castle shogi") tournaments for the title Meijin. (See more at History of shogi § Modern shogi.) The official nature of these arrangements meant that go and shogi masters held different offices. In 1612, eight go and shogi players were given individual state support. This system persisted over two and a half centuries, until the collapse of the Tokugawa government itself in the Meiji Restoration.

The beginning of the oshirogo matches in Edo, seat of the Tokugawa government, meant that at the end of each year, Sansa had to travel east for a month. He is said to have turned down an official residence in Edo's early Nihonbashi district, but was given other accommodations. (It was the unrivaled fourth Hon'inbō, Hon'inbō Dōsaku (1645–1702) who finally moved the school to Edo.) Sansa died in Edo at the age of 65.

== Legacy ==
Honinbō Sansa was succeeded by a youth named Sugimura, who due to his age, had to wait several years after Sansa's death to re-establish the Hon'inbō house as Hon'inbō San'etsu when he turned twenty. However, the title of Meijin was regained by the third head of Hon'inbō, and altogether, seven of the ten generations of historic Meijin were Hon'inbō. In addition, all three traditional Kisei ("Go Sages") were Hon'inbō masters. (Both Meijin and Kisei are now titles administered by the Nihon Ki-in.)

The school established by Hon'inbō Sansa, along with the Inoue and Yasui schools, lasted into the 20th century, but struggled without government backing. In 1936, the last Hon'inbō master, the controversial Hon'inbō Shūsai, turned selection of the Hon'inbō title over to the Nihon Ki-in. (See Honinbō Tournament.)

== In popular culture ==
Sansa has been featured in the Japanese manga Hikaru no Go.

New title	Meijin; 1612–1623	Succeeded by Inoue Nakamura Dōseki
New institution	Hon'inbō; 1612–1623	Succeeded by Hon'inbō San'etsu
