= Ōta Yūzo =

Japanese Go player

Ōta Yūzō
Personal information
- Native name: 太田雄蔵 (Japanese)
- Full name: Ōta Yūzō
- Born: 1807 Japan
- Died: 1856 (aged 48–49)

Sport
- Rank: 7 dan

Ōta Yūzō (太田 雄蔵; 1807–1856) was a professional Go player.

== Biography ==
Ōta was born in 1807. His original birth name was Kawahara Unosuke (川原 卯之助). He had gone through many name changes throughout his life, including Ōta Unosuke, Ōta Ryosuke, and finally, Ōta Yūzo. His father was a merchant at the time, and was from Edo. He had entered the Yasui family when he was still young, and would eventually be promoted to 7 dan on December 24, 1848. Unlike many strong players of his time, Ota never once competed in the castle games. This was due to Ota not following the policy that a go player must shave his head in order to play in the castle games, and given an official rank. At the time, Ota gave an appeal to the policy to allow him to be given the rank of 7 dan. He was so strong, that he was head and shoulders above his rivals. Looking at that fact, after discussion, he was given the rank of 7 dan by the academy, without competing in castle games, or shaving his head. It was the first time anything of its kind was allowed. Although gaining some popularity from this, he was not as famous until he had met Honinbo Shusaku.

== Meeting Shusaku ==
At the time, they were very close in strength, yet far apart in age. The first game Ota played with Shusaku came in June 1842. At the time, Yuzo was 35 years old, and 6 dan. Honinbo Shusaku, was just 13 and already 2 dan. During that summer, they played a total of 11 games. Shusaku won 7, lost 3, and had one jigo. After Shusaku's successive run of wins against Yuzo, he was brought down back to Earth, with Yuzo having his own run. They had become close friends, even playing twice a day. It was agreed that they were rather friends, not rivals. Yuzo was even close to becoming Shusaku's teacher. After that, it took Shusaku 4 years to get rid of the two stone handicap against Ota, and play even.

== The most famous sanjubango ==
In 1853, a group of players joined in a mansion in Edo. The players were Yasui Sanchi, Ito Showa, Sakaguchi Sentoku, Hattori Seitetsu, and Ota. They were discussing Shusaku, to the point where they had come to the fact that Shusaku was the strongest player of the time, but Ota did not agree. He said he was in the middle of a series of games with Shusaku, tied at 3 a piece. Akai Gorosaku, who was a famous sponsor of go competitions during the time, had heard this and decided to sponsor an unheard of sanjubango between Ota and Shusaku. The series had begun in 1853, when Ota was 46 and a 7 dan, while Shusaku was now 24 years old and a 6 dan. The games were played once a week, faster than a usual jubango. Yuzo was doing well until the 11th game, when Shusaku started to fight back. Ota was behind by 4 games after the 17th game. The 21st game was played in July, but the 22nd game was not played until October of that year, a reason of which is not known. The 22nd game was played in Ota's house, which was different than the others, considering they were played in more neutral venues. Ota had lost once more, and the venue was changed to a more neutral one.

== Ota's lifetime masterpiece ==
It is believed, however, the 23rd game, was fixed. It had lasted almost 24 straight hours, and had resulted in a tie. It saved Ota from embarrassment. It was thought as a great achievement, having a tie after taking white, so much that it was used, along with Shusaku's calling up for the castle games, as an excuse to adjourn the match. Ota's fame came from just this one match of the large sanjubango. A short 2 years after the sanjubango, Ota had died. Before his death, he had called the tie against Shusaku "Ota's Lifetime Masterpiece".
