= Igo Hatsuyōron =

1713 Japanese Go work

- Author: Inoue Dōsetsu Inseki
- Original title: 囲碁 発陽論
- Language: Japanese
- Genre: Collection of Tsumego
- Publication date: 1713
- Publication place: Japan

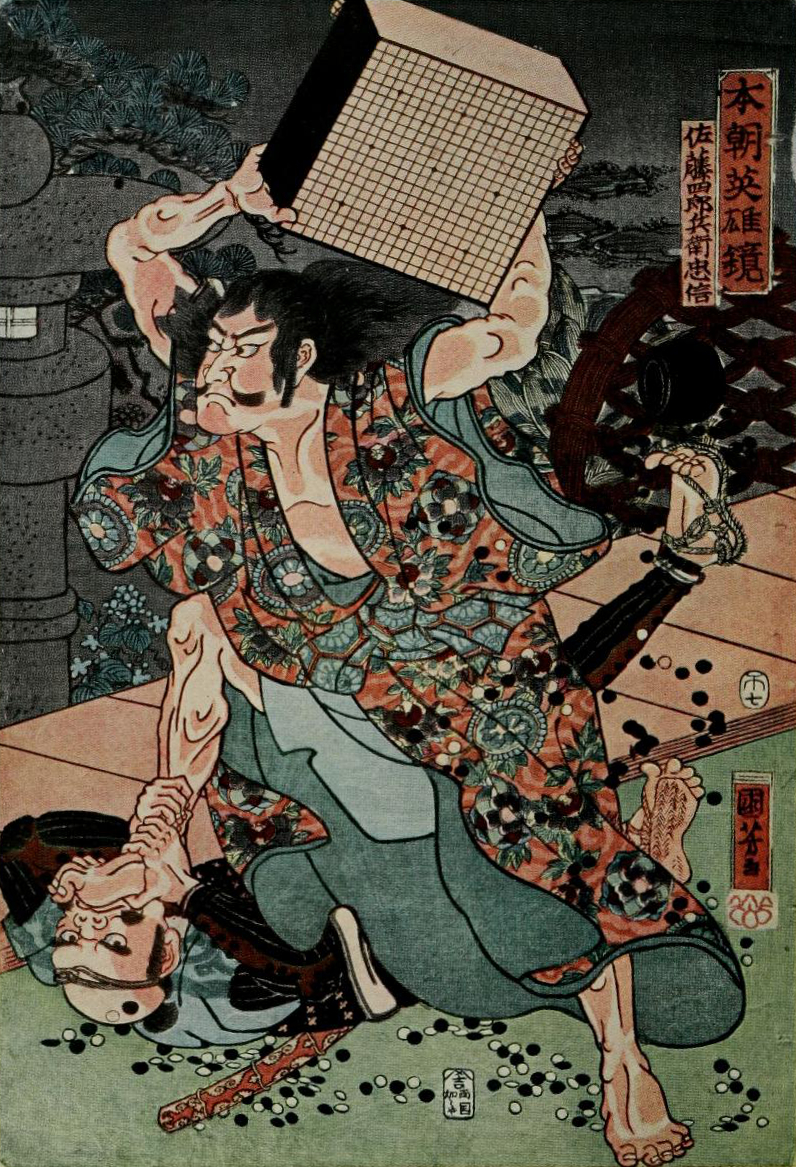
Engraving of Utagawa Kuniyoshi, showing the samurai Satō Tadanobu fighting for his life, armed only with a goban

Igo Hatsuyōron (囲碁 発陽論, literally : On yang production in the game of go, often abbreviated Hatsuyōron) is a collection of 183 go problems (mostly tsumego), compiled in 1713 by the Japanese go master Inoue Dōsetsu Inseki.

Until the end of the 19th century, the Hatsuyōron remained a closely guarded secret of the Inoue house, where it was used to drill the best disciples in the tactics. It became public after the collapse of the Four go houses; several incorrect editions are published, before the discovery in 1982 of a copy that is close to the original now lost.

Igo Hatsuyōron is considered the most difficult of such collections, and as such is still used for training Go professionals. It contains many problems so complex that false or incomplete solutions were given in the first editions, and in particular an exceptional problem by its theme and its depth, rediscovered in 1982, and which is not yet completely solved in 2015.

== History ==
Inoue Dōsetsu Inseki, the fourth head of the Inoue house and Meijin from 1708 to his death in 1719, is best known for his role as guardian of the young Dōchi after the death of his master Dōsaku; his exceptional skill as a composer of go problems was only discovered after the collapse of the Four go houses from 1868, during the Meiji Restoration. (Note: For example, The Go Player's ALMANAC, which relies for its historic part of documents of the Edo period, does not even mention the Hatsuyōron in its section about Dosetsu.)

In 1713, Dōsetsu compiled Igo Hatsuyōron from a collection of more than 1500 problems, many of which were composed by him or improved from previous problems. The book is designed to serve the training of the best disciples, and to this end contains only the problems, without any indication on their solution. (Note: In his postface, Dōsetsu insists on the necessity, for the study of these problems to bear fruit, to give no indication about them, not even the objective to reach.) For more than 150 years, it was kept secret, being studied only one problem at a time, under the direct control of the Inoue house; the very existence of the book was ignored by the other three houses (Hon'inbō, Hayashi and Yasui).

The Hatsuyōron became public after 1868 (passing from hand to hand in the Hon'inbō house), and a first edition is published in 1914 by Hon'inbō Shūsai, enriched with solutions and comments; from that moment, the book acquired its reputation of the "most difficult collection of go problems". Two other editions, mostly from Shūsai’s, but improving and detailing the solutions, appeared in 1953 (under the direction of Hideyuki Fujisawa) and in 1980 (under the direction of Utaro Hashimoto). These editions, however, are based not on the original manuscript (which is thought to have been destroyed in a fire), but on incorrect copies, into which some problems from Xuanxuan Qijing (the oldest Chinese classics) slipped.

In 1982, Araki Naomi discovered a previous copy apparently containing only the problems of the original version, including two previously unknown; the responsibility of a new edition was entrusted to Hideyuki Fujisawa (then Kisei), which caused him to look more closely at one of these two problems (the number 120), to conclude that this is "The most difficult problem ever composed"; he publishes an article on this subject, detailing the remarks of the complete edition.

From 1988, an analysis of the solutions of the 1982 edition by Chinese professionals led them to question some of the Japanese conclusions; Cheng Xiaoliu (Note: 6th dan Chinese Professional.) published in 2010 a revised edition of their comments, under the title of Wéiqí Fāyánglùn Yánjiū (围棋 发 阳 论 研究, Research on Hatsuyōron).

== Content ==
The exact initial composition of the collection is unknown, and the order of the problems is probably corrupt; Cheng Xiaoliu noted that in the edition of 1914, the first problem has no solution, (Note: In the 1982 edition, this issue bears the number 17 and, according to Cheng Xiaoliu, deserves the sarcastic caption: "Black plays and dies".) and suggests that it could have been placed in first position by some rival school, to discredit the book.

The copy used in the 1982 edition, however, is considered fairly close to the original work composed by Dōsetsu, and also contains a written postface by his hand, in which he explains in particular the meaning of the title of the collection and how it should be studied; this copy contains 183 problems, divided into six sections: (Note: This distribution (as well as numbering problems) seems to have been introduced in the 1982 edition by Fujisawa Hideyuki.)

- live (30 problems);
- kill (46 problems, among which 13 problems of sacrifice of blocks (nakade and ishinoshita) grouped at the end of section);
- ko battles (51 problems);
- capturing races (semeai) (36 problems);
- ladders (shichō (Note: Also classified in this section are loose ladders (yurumi shicho), that is to say the sequences where the fleeing group runs through an important part of goban, but fails to win freedom.)) (12 problems);
- various problems (8 problems).

Most of these problems (except perhaps those of the last two sections) can be considered life and death problems; the Hatsuyōron does not deal with issues of strategy, but only aims to develop the capacity of tactical play. These problems, however, are not "realistic" in the sense that they would come from situations that can be met in a real game; they seek above all to show extraordinary moves and maneuvers, and to force one to envisage well-hidden resistances; moreover, one of the conventions chosen for these problems is that "all the stones of the initial setting must be useful", (Note: This convention sometimes makes the resolution easier, since we know that we have not yet perceived all the subtleties of the position if there remains a stone whose role is not understood; it also ensures that there are no really intentional false tracks in these problems.) which Dōsetsu sometimes exploits for additional artistic effects, as displayed by the example of problem 43.

Almost all these problems are at the level of professional players (and are still used in their training), that is to say that an amateur player cannot solve them in a game situation, without the mental aid of laying stones on the board; some of them are so difficult that they are probably insoluble under these conditions, even by the best players; this is particularly the case of the seven problems covering the entire goban, including the astonishing problem 76, which he gives the title "the bait catches the fish".

== The most difficult problem ever composed ==
Go board, 19 by 19. Black stones: S19, H18, M18, F17, N17, B16, M16, C15, D15, F15, M15, N15, P15, Q15, B14, N14, P14, P13, D12, P12, Q12, R12, S12, T12, D11, N11, O11, P11, Q11, A10, F10, M10, A9, E9, M9, S9, T9, A8, E8, J8, Q8, R8, A7, B7, E7, R7, S7, D6, F6, N6, C5, F5, L5, P5, B4, C4, E4, Q4, T4, F3, Q3, R3, T3, C2, O2, Q2, B1, O1, P1, Q1. White stones: R19, J18, K18, N18, S18, H17, R17, C16, K16, O16, P16, L15, R15, S15, D14, F14, Q14, B13, C13, D13, G13, H13, L13, M13, O13, A12, H11, L11, S11, T11, B10, C10, K10, O10, P10, Q10, R10, D9, K9, P9, D8, K8, S8, T8, H7, K7, T7, B6, C6, E6, K6, P6, S6, T6, R5, S5, T5, A4, H4, L4, M4, N4, P4, R4, E3, S3, A2, J2, N2, P2, N1.
Igo Hatsuyōron 120- black to play and win

In 1982, a copy from the 19th century was found, containing two problems not included in previous editions. The manuscript was entrusted to Fujisawa Hideyuki (then Kisei) to make a new edition commented on it, but, assuming that the problem 120 had been copied badly, he handed it over to one of his disciples, Yasuda Yasutoshi, to try to rectify it. He finally saw the unprecedented sacrifice maneuver which is the main theme of the problem, and after about a thousand hours of collective work, (Note: Which is unusually long for professionals: analyzing this question, Harry Fearnley, a British 2nd dan, for example says, discussing the shots yose a secondary variant of the problem 120 with a Korean professional, she showed him immediately the correct sequence... that his group of fans had taken several weeks to determine (Igo Hatsuyoron Problem 120, p. 138).) Fujisawa believed that the problem is solved, and published its solution, translated in GB World number 29 under the title The Most Difficult Problem Ever, accompanied by a complimentary comment, mentioning "the surprising novelty of the theme and forms, the precise calculation of the fights, and the delicate balance of trade and score, all of which make this unique problem the masterpiece of a lifetime".

The statement of the problem (figure on the right) is a position that could almost be drawn from a real game, accompanied by the caption "Black plays and wins the game"; (Note: In fact, this statement was added by Fujisawa; in accordance with the principles stated by Dōsetsu in his postface, the original manuscript contained no indication of the purpose of the problem.) the solution is, in the main variant, a long series of battles using tactics unthinkable even for professional players, containing in particular a sacrifice of twenty black stones that White is obliged to refuse as long as possible, (Note: These stones are on the border of a temporary seki, in a rare configuration known as hanezeki; an accurate analysis of the reasons for which White refuses to accept this poisoned gift is found in the corresponding article of Sensei 's Library; more detailed calculations of the consequences of capture can be found, for example, in Harry Fearnley's study, p. 27.) and completing, after more than one hundred and fifty moves, end-game subtleties (yose) finally ending in a Black victory by one or two points.

This analysis is not disputed by the Chinese edition of Hatsuyōron in 1988, although this edition contains an improvement of the main sequence, bringing the margin of Black's victory to three points. But in 2005, a German amateur player, Joachim Meinhardt, discovered an unexpected resistance of White confirmed by professionals, (Note: Cheng Xiaoliu carefully analyzing this resistance (not attributed to Joachim Meinhardt) in the Chinese edition of 2010 (Cheng 2010, p. 386).) this line of play questions all previous solutions. At the end of 2007, another German amateur, Thomas Redecker, observed that a seemingly mediocre play by Black, which had never been envisaged until then, played at the opportune moment (at move 67) of the main variant), perhaps allows the situation to be saved and decided to publish all of the analyses on a website, later in the form of a book. They are enriched (first with the help of a wiki) by many amateur and professional players, and a winning line for Black was confirmed by professional players starting in 2012, but, in 2015, new variations appeared again; the problem cannot therefore be considered as completely resolved. (Note: The complete resolution of a tsumego problem, according to the criteria of professional players, requires that all essential variants have been explored, and not only that the statement is satisfied (here, that Black wins the game), but that the result is the best possible, and so in this case that Black has the greatest possible advance against the best white resistance.)

From 2016 onwards, the spectacular progress in artificial intelligence led some optimistic amateurs to believe that a solution could be obtained by computer, but attempts in this direction were disappointing until 2019. However, in October 2019, a significant improvement in the deep learning techniques used made it possible to discover new variations based on moves never before envisaged, showing that a definitive solution has still not been reached.

== Notes and references ==
=== References ===
==== Works cited ====
- Inoue Dōsetsu Inseki; Cheng Xiaoliu (1997). Igo Hatsuyo-ron. Yutopian. ISBN 1-889554-01-4.
- Cheng, Xiaoliu (2010). Wéiqí Fāyánglùn Yánjiū 围棋发阳论研究, [Research on Go theory] (in Chinese). People’s Sports Publishing House. ISBN 978-7-5009-3698-5.
- Fujisawa, Hideyuki (Autumn 1982). "The most difficult Go problem ever". Go World. No. 29.
- Redecker, Thomas (2011). The Most Difficult Problem Ever: Igo Hatsuyoron 120 (in German and English). Brett und Stein. ISBN 978-3-940563-18-7. Archived from the original on 2015-04-21.
