= Four Go houses =

Traditional Japanese go schools

In the history of Go in Japan, the four Go houses were four major schools of Go instituted, supported, and controlled by the state, at the beginning of the Tokugawa shogunate. (There were also many minor houses.) At roughly the same time shogi was organised into three houses. Here "house" implies an institution run on the recognised lines of the iemoto system common in all Japanese traditional arts. In particular, the house head had, in three of the four cases, a name handed down: Inoue Inseki, Yasui Senkaku, Hayashi Monnyu. References to these names, therefore, mean to the contemporary head of the house.

The four houses were the Honinbo, Hayashi, Inoue, and Yasui. They were originally designed to be on a par with each other, and competed in the official castle games called oshirogo.

== The houses ==
=== Hon'inbō ===
The Hon'inbō house (本因坊家) was easily the strongest school of Go for most of its existence. It was established in 1612 and survived until 1940.

Upon the closure of the school, the title Hon'inbō came to be used for the winner of the Honinbo Tournament, which is now an annual professional Go event in Japan. It is run under the titleholder system, meaning that at any given time there is a player who can use the title Hon'inbō. It is customary for Japanese players to take a special personal name as Hon'inbō, a unique feature of this title; for example Takagawa Kaku held the title for nine years, and during this time was referred to as Hon'inbō Shukaku. Players of other nationalities by custom do not adopt a special name but do use the Hon'inbō title.

Hon'inbō Shūsai sold his title to the Japan Go Association before retiring in 1936, effectively ending the Hon'inbō line.

All three of the "Go saints" (or Kisei) came from this school— Dosaku, Shusaku, and Jowa (although Jowa is frequently reviled because of his machinations while trying to become Meijin). Most of the holders of the Meijin title (awarded to a player recognised by all as strongest) were also from this house. Another prominent member was Hon'inbō Shūsaku (秀策, 1829–1862), who was heir to become head of the school, but died of cholera before officially becoming Hon'inbō.

=== Hayashi ===
The Hayashi house (林家) was one of the four Go houses of Edo period Japan. It was in effect the junior partner in the system of Go schools, never producing a Meijin player. Always an ally of the Honinbo school, for traditional reasons, it didn't survive to the end of the period as truly independent. Its headship went to Honinbo Shuei, and when he became also Honinbo head, it was de facto merged into the Honinbos.

From the second head onwards, the head of the house when playing was known as Hayashi Monnyū.

=== Inoue ===
The Inoue house (井上家) was one of the four Go houses, the state-supported schools for the game of Go in Japan during the Edo period.

The numbering of the heads of the house is that introduced by Inoue Genan Inseki, at the start of the nineteenth century, and including Nakamura Doseki for reasons of prestige. During their playing careers all the heads, apart from Doseki, were called Inoue Inseki. For reasons of convenience the retirement or posthumous names are used, in the style Inoue Genkaku Inseki with the personal part of the name interposed. Variant names abound.

=== Yasui ===
The Yasui house (安井家) was one of the four Schools (or Houses) of Go which were officially recognized during the Edo period of Japanese history. Each of the four schools were founded by Tokugawa Ieyasu in 1612.

The house had one Meijin, in Yasui Sanchi. It has been commented that the general style of play tended to the pragmatic, rather than the artistic way.

From 1737 to the present, the current head of the Yasui house has been known as Senkaku. The retirement or posthumous names are listed here.

== History ==
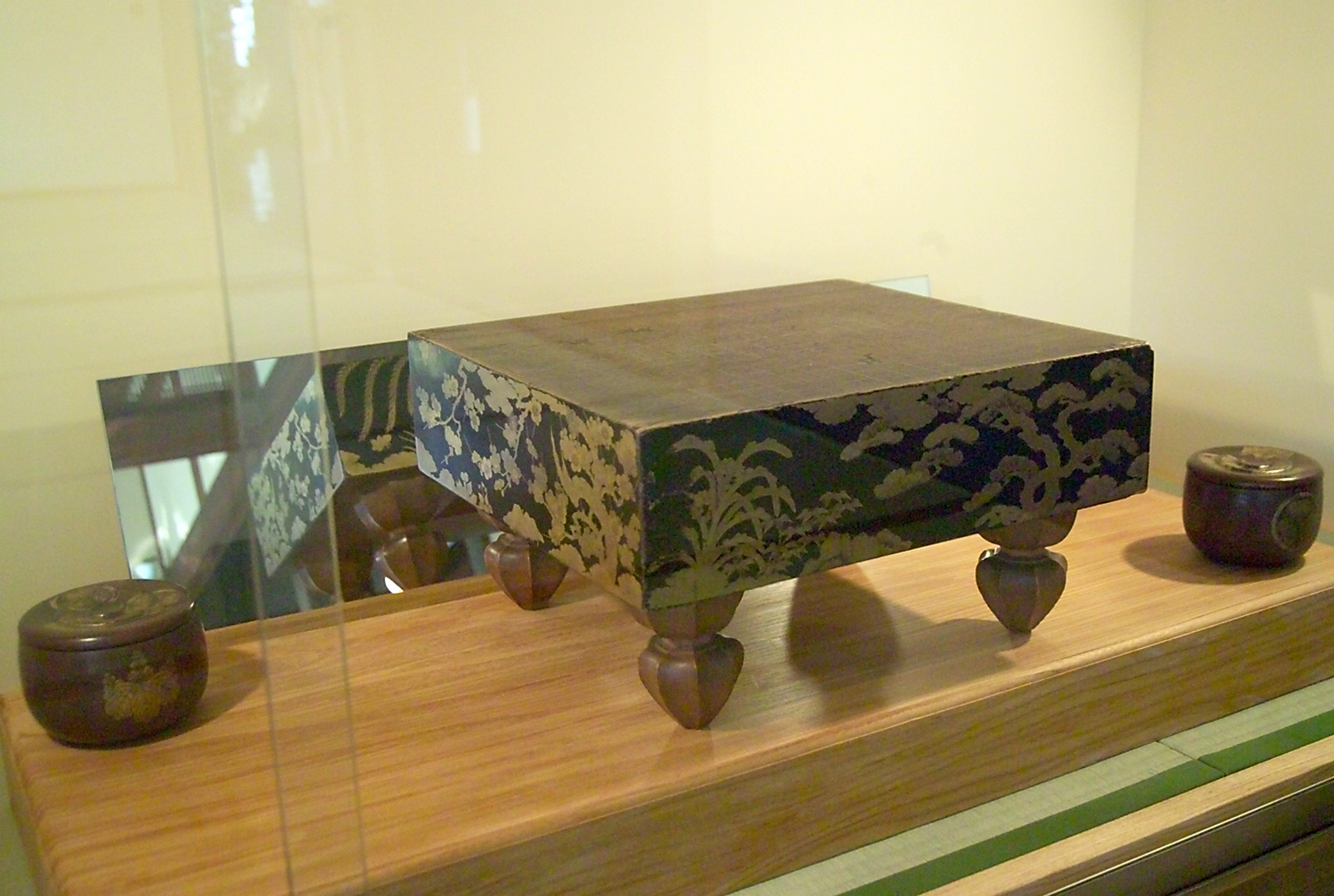
This maki-e Go board is at the temple named Ryōgen'in 龍源院 at Daitoku-ji, Kyoto, Japan. It was said to be used by Toyotomi Hideyoshi and Tokugawa Ieyasu. The bowls to the left and right of the board bear their family crests.

The first of the four houses was the house Honinbo, founded by Honinbo Sansa. Honinbo Sansa was a Buddhist monk and had been appointed Godokoro (minister of Go) by Tokugawa Ieyasu after the unification of Japan (Azuchi–Momoyama period) in 1603.

Following Sansa's death, a dispute arose among the heads of the four houses over who was the strongest player and therefore best placed to succeed him as Meijin and Godokoro. In 1644 a six-game match was arranged between the two leading contenders, Honinbo Sanetsu and Yasui Sanchi; the match took nine years to complete and ended in a tie.

== Buddhist connections ==
They were also nominally Buddhist institutions, with the Honinbo and Hayashi aligned with the Nichiren sect, and the Inoue and Yasui with the Jodo Shu. All players were therefore male. Some outward forms only persisted of that connection, with the oshirogo games being played in Buddhist dress and with shaven heads; the stylish Ota Yuzo was given a waiver of the obligation since he was proud of his hair. After Honinbo Doetsu made a representation that long sleeves were troublesome for the players, a dispensation for shorter sleeves was allowed to them. At least, in theory, matters on succession in the houses were subject to the authority of the jisha bugyo, an official regulating religious establishment. Nominations as heir, typically within the iemoto system of the best disciple, who might not be a natural son but in effect adopted, were supposed to be made official. Deaths at an early age particularly affected the Honinbo house, and irregular succession could occur with the potential for scandal.

== Official status ==
The official posts of Meijin and godokoro were awarded, somewhat sporadically, and brought great prestige to the house. In practice, backstairs intrigue was often brought to bear on the appointments. More creditably, since the Meijin title could only be awarded to the undisputed master player of the time, there were occasions when it was withheld from two candidates whose merit was very close (an example was Genjo and Chitoku, around 1810–1820).

== Teaching ==
The mode of teaching, by apprenticeship, brought a consistent and high level of play (though some say the standard sagged in the eighteenth century). Esoteric teaching was normal, with collections of very difficult tsumego being compiled, one of which, the Igo Hatsuyōron, is still used for professional training. Prepared variations were used in top games (notably in the blood-vomiting game of Jowa and Akaboshi). Go secrets were state secrets, in effect; since the country was closed to foreigners, in the main, the only international competition was against players from the Ryukyu Islands, but those games are still cited as examples of the difference between strong amateurs and extremely strong players.

== Dissolution ==
After a while, the Honinbo house (of Dosaku) emerged as the most prestigious, and the Hayashi house ran into difficulties, eventually being taken over by the Honinbo. The Meiji Restoration threw the system into disarray, but three houses survived some hard times to 1900. Honinbo Shusai arranged that the Honinbo title should become a tournament of the Nihon Ki-in after his death (1939). The Yasui house died out; it is not certain as of 2004 whether the Inoue house theoretically continues or not, though it dropped out of the mainstream from the 1920s.

== See also ==
- Iemoto § Go

== Notes ==
- Nussbaum, Louis Frédéric and Käthe Roth. (2005). Japan Encyclopedia. Cambridge: Harvard University Press. ISBN 978-0-674-01753-5; OCLC 48943301
- Shuzō Ōhira and John Fairbairn. (1977). Appreciating Famous Games. Tokyo: Ishi. OCLC 252292851
