= Genkaku =

Genkaku may refer to:

- Genkaku (go player), one of the heads of the Inoue go house
- Genkaku, a minor character from the game Suikoden II
