= Nikkai =

Nikkai may refer to:

- Honinbo Sansa, whose Buddhist dharma name was Nikkai.
- A Japanese electronics manufacturer, also known as NKK or Nihon Kaiheiki
