= Honinbo Doteki =

Japanese Go player (1669–1690)

Ogawa Doteki
Personal information
- Native name: 本因坊道的 (Japanese)
- Full name: Ogawa Doteki
- Born: 1669 Japan
- Died: 1690 (aged 20–21) Japan

Sport
- Rank: 7 dan

Ogawa Doteki (本因坊道的, 1669–1690), also known as Honinbo Doteki, was a professional Japanese Go player of the Honinbo house.

== Biography ==
By the time Doteki was 13, he was regarded as one of the best players, and became heir to Honinbo Dosaku, his teacher. Still only 13, he had already reached 6 dan. He played in his first Castle Games in November 1684, where he beat Yasui Sanchi 3 games to 0, and was hailed as the best prodigy of the time.

A month after beating Yasui, he was promoted to 7 dan. He was very close to attaining the title of Meijin, and even once beat his teacher, Dosaku, on even. With a full life ahead of him, he was cut short when he died in 1690 at the age of 21. Many believe that if he hadn't died so young, he would have surpassed Dosaku. Because of these facts he has sometimes been referred to as 'Honinbo' Doteki.

== Castle games ==
- 1684-12-16 Yasui Shunchi – Honinbo Doteki, B+7
- 1685-11-30 Honinbo Doteki – Yasui Shunchi, W+3
- 1686-12-19 Honinbo Doteki – Yasui Shunchi, B+5
- 1688-12-12 Yasui Chitetsu – Honinbo Doteki, B+12
- 1689-12-19 Honinbo Doteki – Yasui Chitetsu, W+17
