= Yūzō =

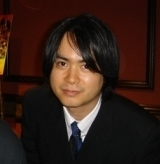
- Yuzo Koshiro, Japanese musician and video game composer
- Pronunciation: jɯɯdzoɯ (IPA)
- Gender: Male

Origin
- Origin: Japanese
- Meaning: Different meanings depending on the kanji used

Other names
- Alternative spelling: Yuzo (Kunrei-shiki) Yuzo (Nihon-shiki) Yūzō, Yuzo, Yuuzou (Hepburn)

Yūzō, Yuzo or Yuuzou is a masculine Japanese given name.

== Written forms ==
Yūzō can be written using different combinations of kanji characters. Here are some examples:

- 勇三, "courage, 3"
- 悠三, "calm, 3"
- 雄三, "male, 3"
- 優三, "gentleness, 3"
- 祐三, "to help, 3"
- 佑三, "to help, 3"
- 勇蔵, "courage, store up"
- 悠蔵, "calm, store up"
- 雄蔵, "male, store up"
- 裕蔵, "rich, store up"
- 優蔵, "gentleness, store up"
- 祐蔵, "to help, store up"
- 佑蔵, "to help, store up"
- 勇造, "courage, create"
- 悠造, "calm, create"
- 雄造, "male, create"
- 優造, "gentleness, create"
- 祐造, "to help, create"
- 佑造, "to help, create"

The name can also be written in hiragana ゆうぞう or katakana ユウゾウ.

== Notable people with the name ==
- Yuzo Aoki (青木悠三; born 1952), Japanese key animator, character designer, and director on Lupin the 3rd Part III
- Yuzo Funakoshi (船越 優蔵; born 1977), Japanese footballer
- Yuzo Hayashi (林 有造; 1842–1921), Japanese politician
- Yuzo Iwakami (岩上 祐三; born 1989), Japanese footballer
- Yuzo Kanemaru (金丸 祐三; born 1987), Japanese sprinter
- Yuzo Kawashima (川島 雄三; 1918–1963), Japanese film director
- Yuzo Kayama (加山 雄三; born 1937), Japanese singer and actor
- Yuzo Kobayashi (小林 祐三; born 1985), Japanese footballer
- Yuzo Koshiro (古代 祐三; born 1967), Japanese musician and video game composer
- Yuzo Kurihara (栗原 勇蔵; born 1983), Japanese footballer
- Yuzo Matsuyama (松山 祐三; 1889–1947), Japanese general
- Yuzo Minami (南 祐三; born 1983), Japanese footballer
- Yuzo Nakamura (中村 祐造; 1942–2010), Japanese volleyball player
- Yuzo Ota (太田 雄蔵; 1807–1856), Japanese Go player
- Yuzo Saeki (佐伯 祐三; 1898–1928), Japanese painter
- Yuzo Takada (高田 裕三; born 1963), Japanese manga artist
- Yuzo Takamido (高御堂 雄三; born 1988), Japanese speed skater
- Yuzo Tamura (田村 雄三; born 1982), Japanese footballer
- Yuzo Tashiro (田代 有三; born 1982), Japanese footballer
- Yuzo Toyama (外山 雄三; 1931–2023), Japanese composer and conductor
- Yuzo Wada (和田 雄三; born 1980), Japanese footballer
- Yuzo Yamamoto (山本 有三; 1887–1974), Japanese writer and playwright

== Fictional characters ==
- Yuzo Kashima (鹿島 雄三), a character from A3!
