= Hon'inbō San'etsu =

Japanese Go player

Personal information
- Native name: 本因坊算悦 (Japanese)
- Full name: Hon'inbō San'etsu
- Born: 1611 Japan
- Died: 1658 (aged 46–47) Japan

Sport
- Teacher: Hon'inbō Sansa; Nakamura Dōseki
- Rank: 8 dan

Hon'inbō San'etsu (本因坊算悦, 1611–1658) was a professional Go player, and second head of the Hon'inbō house.

== Biography ==
San'etsu was the second Hon'inbō. A minor at the time of Hon'inbō Sansa's death, he inherited a difficult situation since he could not receive the official allowance for the house. Sansa had asked Nakamura Dōseki to act as San'etsu's guardian, and through Dōseki's good offices an annual 30 koku of rice was negotiated. During his minority the position of head of the Hon'inbō house was in abeyance, so that the house notionally did not exist.

He played in an international match, giving Peichin Tsuhanoko of the Ryukyu Kingdom a two-stone handicap, when the latter came to Japan with a Ryukyuan embassy in 1634.

The high point of San'etsu's professional career came in a challenge match against Yasui Sanchi. From 1645 to 1653 they played six games of oshirogo, but the result was 3-3. Neither player therefore made the step up from 8 dan to Meijin.

== Notes ==
Preceded by Hon'inbō Sansa	Hon'inbō; 1630–1658	Succeeded by Hon'inbō Dōetsu
