= Tsuchida =

Tsuchida (written: 土田 literally "soil rice field") is a Japanese surname. Notable people with the surname include:

- Aki Tsuchida (土田 亜希, born 1979), Japanese ice hockey player
- Tsuchida Bakusen (土田 麦僊, 1887–1936), Japanese painter
- Hiromi Tsuchida (土田 ヒロミ, born 1939), Japanese photographer
- Hiroshi Tsuchida (土田 大, born 1972), Japanese voice actor and actor
- Hisashi Tsuchida (土田 尚史, born 1967), Japanese footballer
- Masamitsu Tsuchida (土田 正光, born 1944), Japanese Go player
- Masao Tsuchida, Japanese badminton player
- Sanae Tsuchida (土田 早苗, born 1949), Japanese actress
- Shin Tsuchida (土田慎, born 1990), Japanese politician
- Steven Tsuchida, American film and television director
- Toshiro Tsuchida (土田 俊郎, born 1964), Japanese video game designer
- Teruyuki Tsuchida (土田 晃之, born 1972), Japanese comedian, television personality and presenter
- Yoshiko Tsuchida (土田よしこ, 1948–2023), Japanese mangaka
- Wakako Tsuchida (土田 和歌子, born 1974), Japanese wheelchair racer

== See also ==
- Tsuchida Production, a defunct animation production company
