= Toshio Sakai (Go player) =

Japanese Go player

Personal information
- Native name: 酒井利雄 (Japanese)
- Full name: Toshio Sakai
- Born: 1920 Japan
- Died: 1983 (aged 62–63)

Sport
- Rank: 8 dan

Toshio Sakai (酒井 利雄, Sakai Toshio; 1920 – 1983) was a professional Go player. Sakai was promoted to 6 dan in 1970.

== Biography ==
He had 3 brothers, Sakai Michiharu, Sakai Yasuo and Sakai Yoshimitsu. Some players he taught include Baba Shigeru, Ito Yoji, Hikosaka Naoto, Hiroe Katsuhiko, Okumura Hideo, Hamanaka Takamitsu, Akedo Kazumi, Ikezaki Tokinori, and Hotta Seiji.

== Titles & runners-up ==
Title	Years Held
Current	4
(Japan) Okan	1950
(Japan) Okan	1952
(Japan) Okan	1954
(Japan) Okan	1955

Was never a runner-up to any tournament
