= Katsukiyo =

- Gender: Male

Origin
- Origin: Japanese
- Meaning: Different meanings depending on the kanji used

Katsukiyo (written: 勝静 or 勝喜代) is a masculine Japanese given name. Notable people with the name include:

- Itakura Katsukiyo (板倉 勝静; 1823–1889), Japanese daimyō
- Katsukiyo Kubomatsu (久保松 勝喜代), Japanese Go player
