= Richard Bozulich =

American Go player and author (1936–2026)

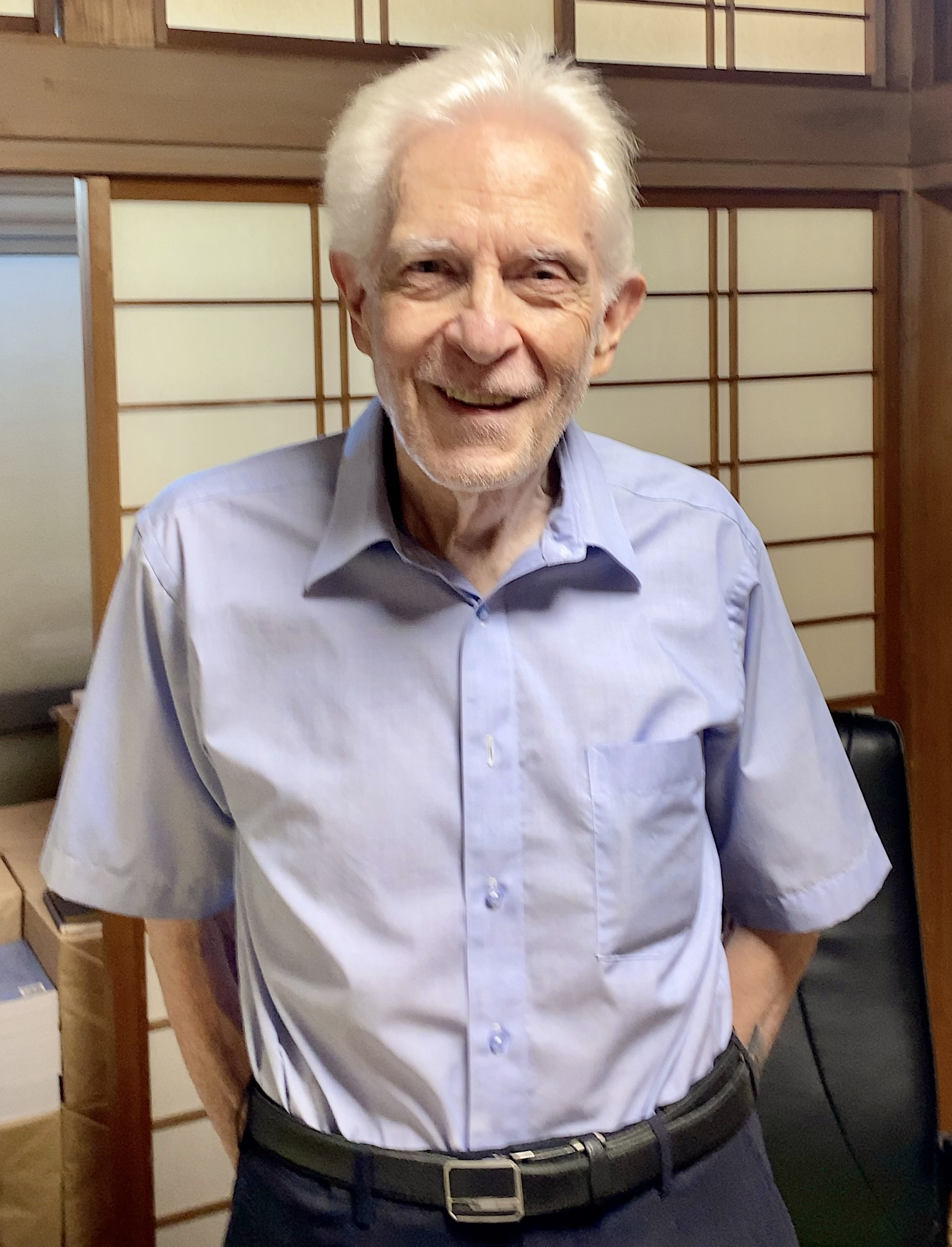
- Born: January 21, 1936; Los Angeles, California, U.S.
- Died: March 9, 2026 (aged 90); Chigasaki, Kanagawa, Japan
- Education: UCLA, University of California, Berkeley
- Occupations: Writer, publisher
- Children: 5
- Writing career
- Language: English
- Period: 1963–1966
- Subject: Go
- Notable works: Ishi Press, Go World
- Website: www.kiseidopublishing.com

Richard Bozulich (January 21, 1936 – March 9, 2026) was an American author, publisher of Go books in English and college math instructor. He co-founded the Ishi Press and was the founding publisher of Kiseido Publishing Co. He has worked with several Japanese professional players. He had a regular Go column in The Daily Yomiuri, which at that time was Japan's largest English-language newspaper.

Bozulich lived in Chigasaki, Japan and worked as an instructor of mathematics at Shonan Institute of Technology until 2005, teaching both physics and chemistry at a local college.

In 2012, Bozulich was a candidate for Comptroller of New York City for the War Veterans Party.

== Early life and education ==
Bozulich was born in Los Angeles, California, on January 21, 1936. His father and mother were from Dugi Otok, an island off Zadar in Croatia.

From 1955 to 1956, he attended UCLA, studying the foundations of mathematics in the philosophy department under Richard Montague. Eventually he graduated from the University of California, Berkeley in 1966 with a BA in mathematics. Bozulich had worked his way through college by buying and selling used technical books. After graduation he decided to become a book publisher.

== Ishi Press ==
Bozulich moved to Japan and in 1967 in partnership with Stuart Dowsey founded The Ishi Press, a book and magazine publishing company that published books primarily about the game of Go.

Ishi Press' first few publications were translations of Japanese books such as Eio Sakata's The Middle Game of Go and Modern Joseki and Fuseki Vol. I and II but Bozulich soon began working with Japanese professional players, as well as principal collaborators James Davies and John Power, to produce original works in English. The first of these, Basic techniques of Go by Nagahara and Haruyama, was published in 1969. In 1973, Bozulich asked James Davies to write a seven-volume set covering the fundamentals of go, titled The Elementary Go Series. The first two volumes of this series, In the Beginning by Ishigure (and Davies) and 38 Basic Joseki by Kosugi and Davies were published in 1974. By 1984, the set was complete, when Ishi Press published Nagahara and Bozulich's Handicap Go. Meanwhile, Bozulich continued to translate and publish Japanese material for the nascent Western Go-playing community, selecting volumes such as Kageyama's Lessons in the Fundamentals of Go and Kage's Secret Chronicles of Handicap Go, and a series of books about basic opening strategies: The Power of the Star-Point (Takagawa), The Chinese Opening: The Sure Win Strategy (Kato) and The 3–3 Point: Modern Opening Theory (Cho).

In 1977, the Japan Go Association ceased publication of Go Review, their English-language magazine. Working closely with Power, Bozulich published a quarterly magazine Go World which continued through 129 issues, ceasing publication in 2013. For many years Go World was the major source in English for comprehensive analysis of top Japanese tournament games.

== Kiseido ==
In 1982 Bozulich founded Kiseido Publishing Company, publishing Invincible: The Games of Shusaku. This biography and game collection by John Power is about Honinbo Shusaku, the most famous Japanese player from the 1800s. Kiseido became more active in the 1990s, when Bozulich produced two more multi-volume sets of instructional material: the twelve volume Mastering the Basics series, and the ten volume Get Strong at Go series. Kiseido continues to publish other books as well, such as The Go Player's Almanac, The World of Chinese Go and An Introduction to Modern Fuseki: Korean Style.

== Go World ==
Bozulich wrote or published more than 100 books, magazines and newspaper articles about the game of Go. He was the world's most prolific author of Go materials in English. Bozulich was the publisher of Go World magazine until it ceased publication in 2012, after 129 issues.

== Death ==
Bozulich died on March 9, 2026, at the age of 90.

== Bibliography ==
- All About Ko (2007) ISBN 978-4-906574-76-6
- The Basics of Go Strategy (2007) ISBN 978-4-906574-75-9
- 501 Tesuji Problems (2005) ISBN 4-906574-74-2
- Making Good Shape (2002) ISBN 4-906574-73-4
- One Thousand and One Life-and-Death Problems (2002) ISBN 4-906574-72-6
- Five Hundred and One Opening Problems (2002) ISBN 4-906574-71-8
- Get Strong at Tesuji (2002) ISBN 4-906574-56-4
- Get Strong at Attacking (2002) ISBN 4-906574-60-2
- Get Strong at Invading (2000) ISBN 4-906574-55-6
- The Go Player's Almanac (2001) ISBN 4-87187-040-5
- The Second Book of Go (Beginner and Elementary Go Books) (1998) ISBN 4-906574-31-9
- Get Strong at Handicap Go (1998) ISBN 4-906574-59-9
- Get Strong at the Endgame (1997) ISBN 4-906574-57-2
- Get Strong at Life and Death (1997) ISBN 4-906574-58-0
- Get Strong at the Opening (1996) ISBN 4-906574-51-3
- Get Strong at Joseki, Volume 1 (1995) ISBN 4-906574-52-1
- Get Strong at Joseki, Volume 2 (1996) ISBN 4-906574-53-X
- Get Strong at Joseki, Volume 3 (1996) ISBN 4-906574-54-8
- Geometries, Groups and Algebras in the Nineteenth Century – A History ISBN 4-87187-836-8
- Magic of Go: A Complete Introduction to the Game of Go (1988) ISBN 4-87187-041-3
- An Introduction to Go (1984) ISBN 4-87187-030-8
- Handicap Go (1982) ISBN 4-87187-016-2
- Modern Joseki and Fuseki, Vol. 1: Parallel Fuseki, Ishi Press 1968, reprinted 2006 ISBN 0-923891-75-7
- Modern Joseki and Fuseki, Vol. 2: The Opening Theory of Go, Ishi Press 1971, reprinted 2006 ISBN 0-923891-76-5
- The Middle Game of Go or "Chubansen", Ishi Press, 1971, ISBN 0-923891-77-3
