= Shin Kato =

Japanese Go player

Personal information
- Native name: 加藤信 (Japanese)
- Born: 5 November 1891 Tokyo, Japan
- Died: 14 July 1952 (aged 60)

Sport
- Turned pro: 1908
- Teacher: Heijiro Hirose
- Rank: 8 dan

Shin Kato (加藤 信, Katō Shin; 5 November 1891 – 14 July 1952) was a Japanese professional Go player. Born in Tokyo, Kato became a student of Hirose Heijiro in 1907. He turned professional a year later with the Hoensha. He was promoted to 8 dan in 1942. He participated in the 1st Honinbo tournament where he finished runner-up to Riichi Sekiyama.

== Titles and runners-up ==
Domestic
Title	Wins	Runners-up
Honinbo		1 (1941)
Total	0	1
