= Kaori Aoba =

Japanese Go player

Personal information
- Native name: 青葉 かおり (Japanese)
- Full name: Kaori Aoba
- Born: July 11, 1978 (age 47) Aichi Prefecture, Japan

Sport
- Teacher: Hane Yasumasa
- Rank: 5 dan
- Affiliation: Nihon Ki-in

Kaori Aoba (青葉 かおり, Aoba Kaori; born July 11, 1978) is a female professional 5 dan Go player. She is currently an affiliate of the Nihon Ki-in, the largest Go association of Japan, and was a student of Yasumasa Hane.

On 4 September 2008, Aoba was defeated by Crazy Stone, a Monte-Carlo Tree Search Go playing engine, in an 8-stone handicap game in Tokyo, Japan. The exhibition match marks the earliest official defeat of a professional by a computer with a conventional handicap.
