= Yusuke Oeda =

Japanese Go player

Personal information
- Native name: 大枝雄介 (Japanese); オオエダユウスケ (Japanese)
- Born: January 15, 1935 Tokyo, Japan
- Died: July 17, 2010 (aged 75)

Sport
- Teacher: Nobuaki Maeda
- Rank: 9 dan
- Affiliation: Nihon Ki-in, Tokyo branch

Yusuke Oeda (大枝雄介, Oeda Yusuke; January 15, 1935 – July 17, 2010) was a 9-dan professional Go player, affiliated with the Nihon Ki-in, who lived in Japan. He was a student of Nobuaki Maeda.

== Promotion record ==
Rank	Year	Notes
1 dan	1954	
2 dan	1954	
3 dan	1955	
4 dan	1956	
5 dan	1959	
6 dan	1962	
7 dan	1967	
8 dan	1974	
9 dan	1992	

This is a list of pupils who have been taught by Yusuke Oeda in the game of Go.

- Ryu Shikun (from 1986)
- Kana Mannami
- Yasutoshi Yasuda (from 1977)
- Morito Oubuchi (from 1983)
- Yo Kagen (from 1982)
- Michael Redmond (from 1977)
- Yasuhiko Onda (from 1982)
- Yo Kaei (from 1984)
- Hideichiro Iguchi (from 1977)
- Yoshifumi Endo
- Zenki Han
- Ryutaro Miyazaki
- Shimako Miyazaki
- Masanori Kurotaki
- Masaki Kurotaki
- Gensho Shimoji
- David Mechner
