= Akedo Kazumi =

Japanese professional Go player (born 1947)

Kazumi Akedo
Personal information
- Native name: 明戸和巳 (Japanese); アケドカズミ (Japanese)
- Full name: Kazumi Akedo
- Born: June 27, 1947 (age 78) Hamamatsu, Japan

Sport
- Rank: 9 dan
- Affiliation: Nihon Ki-in, Chubu branch

Akedo Kazumi (明戸和巳; born June 27, 1947) is a Japanese professional Go player.

== Biography ==
Kazumi was born in Hamamatsu, Shizuoka Prefecture, Japan. He is a student of Toshio Sakai.

== Promotion record ==
Rank	Year	Notes
1 dan	1968	
2 dan	1969	
3 dan	1970	
4 dan	1973	
5 dan	1974	
6 dan	1984	
7 dan		
8 dan		
9 dan		
