= Katsukiyo Kubomatsu =

Japanese Go player

- Kanji: 久保松勝喜代
- Born: 25 October 1894; Japan
- Died: 15 December 1941 (aged 47)
- Rank: 9 dan

Katsukiyo Kubomatsu (久保松勝喜代; 25 October 1894 – 15 December 1941) was a Japanese professional go player. Nicknamed the Great Amateur, Kubomatsu was responsible for sending Utaro Hashimoto and Minoru Kitani to Kensaku Segoe and Tamejiro Suzuki respectively and also taught Nobuaki Maeda. Kubomatsu was known as one of the earliest innovators of the shin-fuseki, a revolution in Go theory pioneered by his student Minoru Kitani and Go Seigen in the 1930s. Kubomatsu was known for starting on the tengen, the center point of the board. He was posthumously promoted to 9 dan by the Nihon Ki-in and Kansai Ki-in in 2009, 67 years after his death.
