= Hikosaka =

Hikosaka (written: 彦坂) is a Japanese surname. Notable people with the surname include:

- Masakatsu Hikosaka (彦坂 匡克, born 1991), Japanese rugby sevens player
- Naoto Hikosaka (彦坂 直人, born 1962), Japanese Go player
