= Nakamura Dōseki =

Japanese Go player

Nakamura Dōseki (中村 道碩, 1582–1630) was a Japanese professional Go player. Tradition counts him as the founder of the Inoue house. This was in fact a retrospective inclusion, essentially a fabrication of the early nineteenth century by Inoue Gennan Inseki. It accounts for the name Inoue Nakamura Dōseki sometimes given.

Nakamura was taught by Hon'inbō Sansa. He was the first Inoue go house leader, and second head of the Meijin post.

He was the second Meijin. He is quite famous for his game against Yasui Santetsu, in which the first play was at a 3–10 point on a side, going against the orthodoxy about starting in a corner.

Preceded by Hon'inbō Sansa	Meijin; 1623–1630	Succeeded by Yasui Sanchi
New title Nominal founder of house	Inoue house head 1612–1630	Succeeded by Inoue Genkaku Inseki
