= Shigeru Baba =

Japanese Go player

Personal information
- Native name: 馬場滋 (Japanese)
- Full name: Shigeru Baba
- Born: January 19, 1948 (age 78) Nagoya, Japan

Sport
- Teacher: Toshio Sakai
- Rank: 9 dan
- Affiliation: Nihon Ki-in

Shigeru Baba (馬場滋, Baba Shigeru) (born January 19, 1948, in Nagoya, Japan) is a professional Go player.

== Biography ==
Shigeru was a disciple of Toshio Sakai. He plays in the Nagoya branch of the Nihon Ki-in, where he came close to winning the Okan title in 1980.

== Runners-up ==
Title	Years Held
Current	1
(Japan) Okan	1980
