= Hirose Heijirō =

Japanese Go player

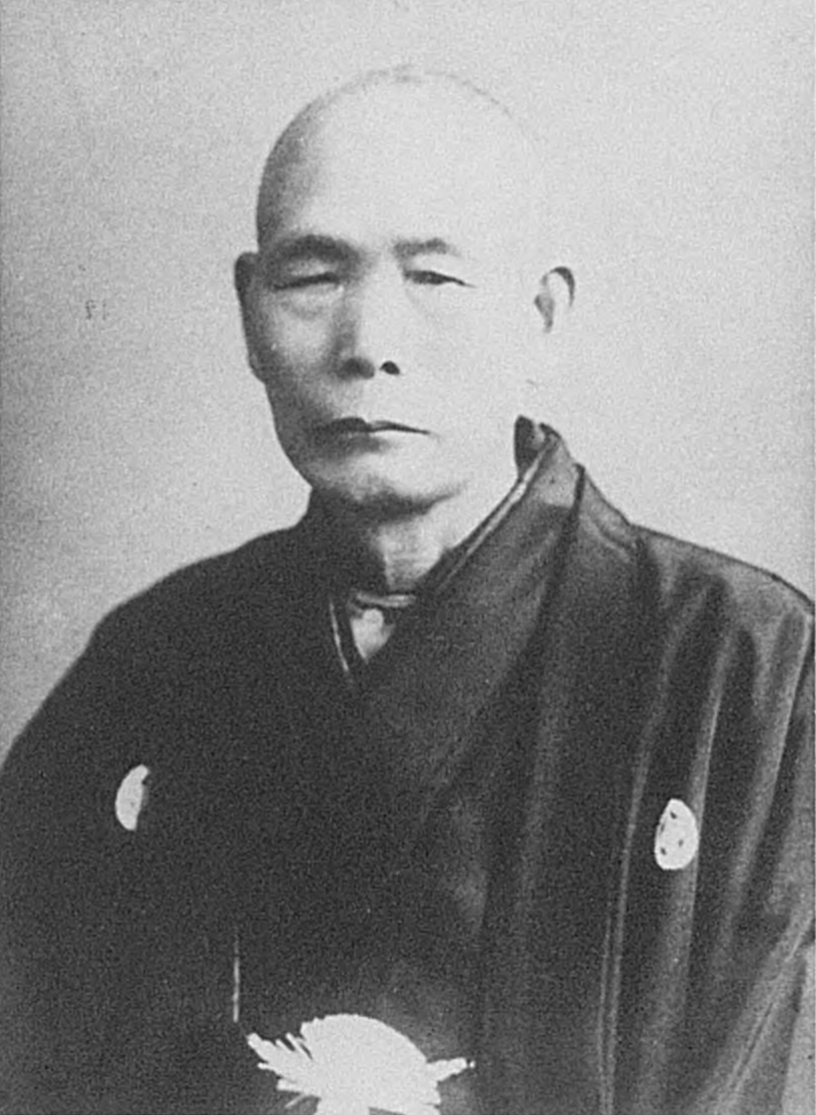

Personal information
- Native name: 広瀬平治郎 (Japanese)
- Full name: Hirose Heijirō
- Born: 1865 Japan
- Died: 1940 (aged 74–75) Japan

Sport
- Rank: 7 dan

Hirose Heijirō (広瀬平治郎, Heijirō Hirose; 1865–1940) was a Japanese professional Go player of Hoensha and Nihon Ki-in who reached 5-dan in 1902. Hirose was the teacher of Iwamoto Kaoru and Kato Shin. Other disciples of Hirose included Tsuyamori Itsuro, Iida Haruji and Sakaguchi Tsunejiro.

== Biography ==
- In 1895 he achieved 3 dan.
- In 1898 he achieved 4 dan.
- In 1901 he started to play Jubango with Ishii Senji.
- In 1902 he achieved 5 dan.
- In 1907 he started to play Jubango with Izawa Genkichi.
- In 1912 he achieved 6 dan.
- In 1918 he traveled to China because of an invitation from the prime minister of the Republic of China.
- In 1920 he became the fifth president of Hoensha.
- In 1921 he achieved 7 dan.
- In 1924 he retired because of illness.
