= Igo Senshuken =

Go competition

The Igo Senshuken was a Go competition.

== Outline ==
The final of the Igo Senshuken was decided in a best-of-five match. Each player had 6 hours to think. The challengers came from a knock-out with 16 players.

== Past winners and runners-up ==
Player	Years Held
Sakata Eio	1958
Shimamura Toshihiro	1965

Player	Years Lost
Kitani Minoru	1958
Yamabe Toshiro	1965
