= Tatsuaki Iwata =

Japanese Go player (1926–2022)

Personal information
- Native name: 岩田達明 (Japanese)
- Full name: Tatsuaki Iwata
- Born: January 2, 1926 Nagoya, Japan
- Died: June 30, 2022 (aged 96)

Sport
- Turned pro: 1943
- Teacher: Kitani Minoru
- Rank: 9 dan
- Affiliation: Nihon Ki-in

Tatsuaki Iwata (岩田達明, Iwata Tatsuaki; January 2, 1926 – June 30, 2022), also known as Masao Iwata, was a Japanese professional Go player.

== Biography ==
Iwata was a 9-dan Go professional from the Nagoya branch of the Nihon Ki-in. He won his 800th professional game in 2004. He retired from tournament play in 2011. He died in 2022 at the age of 96.

== Promotion record ==
Rank	Year	Notes
1 dan	1943	
2 dan	1944	
3 dan	1947	
4 dan	1949	
5 dan	1951	
6 dan	1954	
7 dan	1959	
8 dan	1961	
9 dan	1964	

== Titles & runners-up ==
Title	Years Held
Current	6
(Japan) Okan	1967, 1969, 1970, 1976, 1979, 1980

Title	Years Lost
Current	6
(Japan) Okan	1965, 1972, 1977, 1981, 1985, 1989

== See also ==
- International Go Federation
- List of Go organizations
- List of professional Go tournaments
