= Seto Taiki =

Japanese Go player (born 1984)

Personal information
- Native name: 瀬戸大樹 (Japanese)
- Full name: Seto Taiki
- Born: March 27, 1984 (age 42) Mie, Japan

Sport
- Turned pro: 2000
- Rank: 9 dan
- Affiliation: Kansai Ki-in

Seto Taiki (瀬戸大樹, Seto Taiki; born March 27, 1984) is a Kansai Ki-in professional Go player.

== Biography ==
Seto became a professional player in 2000 for the Kansai Ki-in. In his first 5 years at the Kansai Ki-in, he had a spectacular record in the Oteai with 51 wins and just 3 losses through 2005. In 2000, he scored 12 wins and 0 losses. In 2001, he also scored 12 wins and 0 losses. In 2002 he finally lost his first Oteai match with a record of 11 wins and 1 loss. In 2002 his record was 8 wins and 2 losses. In the final year of the Oteai, his record was 8 wins and 0 losses. This amounted his Oteai career record to a 94.4% winning percentage. His run was stopped after the Oteai was replaced with a similar system used by the Nihon Ki-in of promotion through title winning. He won the Nagai award in 2000, along with an award for his run of wins.

He was promoted to 9 dan on the 9th January 2026.
