= Shimamura Toshihiro =

Japanese Go player

Personal information
- Native name: 島村俊廣 (Japanese)
- Full name: Shimamura Toshihiro
- Born: April 12, 1912 Japan
- Died: June 21, 1991 (aged 79)

Sport
- Rank: 9 dan

Shimamura Toshihiro (島村 俊廣, Shimamura Toshihiro; April 12, 1912—June 21, 1991) was a professional Go player.

== Biography ==
Shimamura reached 9 dan in 1960. He was a teacher to many players including Hane Yasumasa, Yamashiro Hiroshi, Nakano Hironari, Imamura Yoshiaki, Shimamura Michiro, Shigeno Yuki, and Matsumoto Nayoko.

== Titles and runners-up ==
Domestic
Title	Wins	Runners-up
Honinbo		2 (1955, 1956)
Oza	1 (1957)	1 (1955)
Tengen	1 (1977)	
NHK Cup	1 (1954)	
Okan	8 (1957, 1959, 1960, 1962, 1964, 1965, 1974, 1975)	3 (1967, 1969, 1976)
Asahi Top Position		1 (1958)
Igo Senshuken	1 (1965)	
Total	12	7
