= Okan (Go competition) =

The Okan (Japanese: 王冠, Hepburn: Ōkan, 'crown' or 'king's crown') is a Japanese Go competition. It is open only to players of the Nihon Ki-in's Chubu branch located in Nagoya. The title match is a single game played between the reigning titleholder and a challenger. The winner's purse is 1,700,000 yen ($15,000).

== Winners and runners-up ==
Okan
Edition	Year	Winner	Runner-up
1st	1953	Michiharu Sakai	
2nd	1956	Tatsuaki Iwata	
3rd	1957	Michiharu Sakai	
4th	1958	Tatsuaki Iwata	
5th	1959	Tatsuaki Iwata	
6th	1960	Toshihiro Shimamura	五十川正雄
7th	1961	Toshihiro Shimamura	Tatsuaki Iwata
8th	1962	Toshihiro Shimamura	五十川正雄
9th	1964	Toshihiro Shimamura	五十川正雄
10th	1965	Toshihiro Shimamura	Tatsuaki Iwata
11th	1967	Tatsuaki Iwata	Toshihiro Shimamura
12th	1969	Tatsuaki Iwata	Toshihiro Shimamura
13th	1970	Tatsuaki Iwata	Masamitsu Tsuchida
14th	1972	Yasumasa Hane	Tatsuaki Iwata
15th	1974	Toshihiro Shimamura	Yasumasa Hane
16th	1975	Toshihiro Shimamura	Yasumasa Hane
17th	1976	Tatsuaki Iwata	Toshihiro Shimamura
18th	1977	Hiroshi Yamashiro	Tatsuaki Iwata
19th	1978	Yasumasa Hane	Hiroshi Yamashiro
20th	1979	Tatsuaki Iwata	Yasumasa Hane
21st	1980	Tatsuaki Iwata	Shigeru Baba
22nd	1981	Hiroshi Yamashiro	Tatsuaki Iwata
23rd	1982	Hiroshi Yamashiro	Yasumasa Hane
24th	1983	Yasumasa Hane	Hiroshi Yamashiro
25th	1984	Hiroshi Yamashiro	Yasumasa Hane
26th	1985	Hiroshi Yamashiro	Tatsuaki Iwata
27th	1986	Hiroshi Yamashiro	Yasumasa Hane
28th	1987	Hiroshi Yamashiro	Masamitsu Tsuchida
29th	1988	Masaki Ogata	Hiroshi Yamashiro
30th	1989	Masaki Ogata	Tatsuaki Iwata
31st	1990	Masaki Ogata	Yasumasa Hane
32nd	1991	Masaki Ogata	Yasumasa Hane
33rd	1992	Yasumasa Hane	Masaki Ogata
34th	1993	Hiroshi Yamashiro	Yasumasa Hane
35th	1994	Hiroshi Yamashiro	Masaki Ogata
36th	1995	Hiroshi Yamashiro	Yasumasa Hane
37th	1996	Hiroshi Yamashiro	Naoto Hikosaka
38th	1997	Hironari Nakano	Hiroshi Yamashiro
39th	1998	Hironari Nakano	Hiroshi Yamashiro
40th	1999	Naoki Hane	Hironari Nakano
41st	2000	Hiroshi Yamashiro	Naoki Hane
42nd	2001	Hiroshi Yamashiro	Hideki Matsuoka
43rd	2002	Naoki Hane	Hiroshi Yamashiro
44th	2003	Naoki Hane	Naoto Hikosaka
45th	2004	Naoki Hane	Hiroshi Yamashiro
46th	2005	Hiroshi Yamashiro	Naoki Hane
47th	2006	Hideki Matsuoka	Hiroshi Yamashiro
48th	2007	Naoki Hane	Hideki Matsuoka
49th	2008	Naoki Hane	Hiroshi Yamashiro
50th	2009	Naoki Hane	Hiroshi Yamashiro
51st	2010	Hiroshi Yamashiro	Naoki Hane
52nd	2011	Naoki Hane	Hiroshi Yamashiro
53rd	2012	Naoki Hane	Hironari Nakano
54th	2013	Naoki Hane	Hironari Nakano
55th	2014	Naoki Hane	Hiroshi Yamashiro
56th	2015	Naoki Hane	Masaki Ogata
57th	2016	Atsushi Ida	Naoki Hane
58th	2017	Atsushi Ida	Yuta Mutsuura
59th	2018	Atsushi Ida	Hironari Nakano
60th	2019	Atsushi Ida	Masaki Ogata
61st	2020	Atsushi Ida	Yu Otake
62nd	2021	Atsushi Ida	Yu Otake
63rd	2022	Atsushi Ida	Yuta Mutsuura
64th	2023	Atsushi Ida	Yuta Mutsuura
65th	2024	Atsushi Ida	Yuta Mutsuura
