= Tsumego =

Type of go problem

Tsumego (詰碁) is the Japanese term for a type of go problem based on life-and-death. The term likely comes from tsumeshogi (詰将棋, tsumeshōgi), as tsumeru (詰める) means checkmating in shogi but has different meanings in go. Tsumego problems are common in newspaper columns.

Tsumego problems have been found in Chinese books dating back to around the 13th century, such as the Xuanxuan Qijing (1349), a six-volume collection whose final three volumes are devoted to problems of life and death, invasions, and the capture of opposing groups. They were presumably composed and collected from actual games much earlier. They range from situations that occur quite commonly, which every strong player ought to be familiar with, to deliberately difficult puzzles. Some books of the latter type are still used for professional training.

Several conventions are used in the problems. The objective is to kill a group or prevent it from being killed. Problems do not specify how many plays are in the solution (as would be usual in a chess problem), because the goal of the problem is rarely to capture stones; as soon as the correct first move is played, the threatened group can be considered alive (or dead). Solution diagrams will either show the most tenacious resistance that the opponent can offer, or lines that require interesting or tricky tactics. If only part of the board is shown, as is usually the case, the rest of the board can be assumed to be empty. The modern convention is that well composed problems do not allow the threatened group to escape into empty areas of the board (this is one way in which such problems differ from real games), although escape and recapture was a theme in classical problems.

== See also ==
- Nobuaki Maeda
- Yilun Yang
- Igo Hatsuyōron
