= Masaki Ogata =

Japanese Go player

Personal information
- Native name: 小県 真樹 (Japanese); オガタマサキ (Japanese); Xiao Xian Zhen Shu (Chinese)
- Full name: Masaki Ogata
- Born: September 7, 1964 (age 61) Gifu Prefecture, Japan

Sport
- Turned pro: 1980
- Teacher: Tsuchida Masamitsu
- Rank: 9 dan
- Affiliation: Nihon Ki-in

Masaki Ogata (小県 真樹, born 1964) is a professional 9 dan Japanese Go player. He became an insei at the Nihon Ki-in in 1976 under Tsuchida Masamitsu, and turned professional in 1980. Ogata won the Kido magazine Shinjin (English: "New player") award with 38 wins and 8 losses in 1983, and the Kido award for most wins in 1988 with a record of 39 wins, 1 draw and 13 losses. He is currently affiliated with the Nagoya branch of the Nihon Ki-in.

== Titles & runners-up ==
Title	Years Held
Current	4
(Japan) Okan	1988–1991

Title	Years Lost
Current	2
(Japan) Okan	1992, 1994
Defunct	1
(Japan) Shin-Ei	1988
