= Yasui Sanchi =

Japanese Go player (1617–1703)

Yasui Sanchi (安井算知, 1617–1703) was a Japanese professional Go player, and second head of the Yasui house.

He became Meijin-godokoro in 1668. It has always been said that this promotion was achieved by a backstairs route, with influence exerted by the head of the Matsudaira clan. A related anecdote has Hon'inbō San'etsu facing down Lord Matsudaira during an earlier official oshirogo against Sanchi.

The Hon'inbō house did not take this lying down. From 1668 to 1675 Hon'inbō Dōetsu played a twenty-game match against Sanchi (they had played in 1649, but after that there was a dearth of competitive games). Dōetsu had the better of it with Black, earning the right to a game with White (as at sen-ai-sen).

Preceded by Nakamura Dōseki	Meijin; 1668–1676	Succeeded by Hon'inbō Dōsaku
Preceded by Yasui Santetsu	Yasui house head 1644–1696	Succeeded by Yasui Chitetsu
