= Professional Go handicaps =

Professional Go handicaps were a system developed in Japan, in the Edo period, for handicapping professional players of the game of Go against each other. With the abolition of the Oteai system, which from the 1920s had used some handicap games to determine the Go ranking of professional players, this system has become obsolete. It is now completely superseded by the use of komidashi. Knowledge of it is required to understand the conditions of play in historical Go matches, particularly the jubango that died out around 1960.

== Pro levels ==
The professional Go ranks have traditionally been divided into nine levels, with shodan or 1 dan being the initial grade for a student player certified as professional (kishi in Japanese). The ranks go up to 9 dan, the whole system being based on old customs from the Chinese Imperial court. (The imperial court had 1 pin as highest and 9 pin as lowest however). To this day there are nine professional dan levels in China and South Korean as well as in Japan; the same applies in Taiwan. The basic system described at Go handicaps is insufficient to provide an accurate ranking, because professional levels are closer together. It is considered inconceivable that any pro should take a four-stone handicap from another.

Theoretically all nine pro levels were within a three-stone handicap spread. In modern times that has become even tighter, since professional shodan is not generally awarded to players who will remain at that level thereafter. In terms of a notional Elo system, if 100 points is one amateur rank, the professional levels were notionally more like 35 points apart. That in contemporary Go and under modern playing conditions has been compressed down, to fewer than 30 points apart.

In the Edo period, however, apprentice professionals would often be admitted as professional 1 dan at a young age (Honinbo Shusai at 13, but this was by no means young; Takagawa Kaku was admitted at 11). These players might be at current amateur 6 dan or even 5 dan level, but would be promising talents.

It is documented that Takagawa let slip the comment that Go Seigen was 'one-third of a stone' stronger than he. This is evidence that the spreading of pro levels at three per handicap stone was a standard way of calibrating strengths.

== Josen ==
The foundation of the old system was that josen applied to a professional rank difference of 2 dan.

Josen (定先) is the Go term describing the phase in a series of matches between two players - such as a jubango, where one player takes Black (makes the first move) throughout. One says also "playing at sen", or a "one-stone-handicap game".

Players are taken to be evenly matched at two ranks apart if the victories are evenly divided at sen; or in other words the higher-ranked player can manage 50% wins with White.

== Sen-ai-sen ==
Sen-ai-sen (先相先, senaisen) describes the handicap of taking Black (making the first move) in two games out of every three. This was the smallest handicap possible between two players in the era before the introduction of komi.

This is the crucial level from the point of view of promotions under the handicap system. To prove one is under-ranked, one should play a match against a player of one rank above. To break even under sen-ai-sen means to win (for example) 65% of games with Black, and 20% of games with White; or two games out of three with Black, and one game in six with White. A steady player, under the old style of opening, would aim to win games with Black more frequently; a less consistent but more aggressive player would expect better success in claiming some wins with White with ambitious strategies to cause confusion on the board.

== Tagaisen ==
Tagaisen (互い先) is the handicap for players of equal rank. They alternate with Black. The player who first gets Black will be chosen by some method such as nigiri, which is having one player pick a handful of stones, and the other player putting one (indicating odd) or two stones (indicating even). If the other players guess right they play black.

== Other handicaps ==
The principles were extended: for a rank difference of three the handicap was sen-ni-sen, which meant one game on a two-stone handicap out of every three, the others being with Black. Then came ni-sen-ni for rank difference of four, and a plain two-stone handicap for rank difference five. From then on the steps replaced a two-stone handicap by a three-stone handicap, for six and seven difference. Theoretically, then, a professional shodan should play a 9 dan (who by definition would be Meijin) at three stones in every game. This system provided a basis in the Oteai for any two players to compete.

== Game records ==
The kifu of old games typically have an annotation showing the handicap position. Even if the game was a one-off challenge, there was very often the implied context: the players had formal ranks, the game might be notionally part of a longer series. The modern way to indicate Black in a Japanese game record is still to write sen ban.

== Beating down ==
Usually, after three or four games are won in a row by the same player (or some other agreed threshold is reached), the handicap shifts. For example, when senaisen (BWB) was being used, the handicap moves to josen (B) or to tagaisen (even, BW). A player against whom the handicap moves is said to be 'beaten down', at least a requirement to acknowledge the strength of the opponent, possibly a severe professional humiliation. The jubango series sponsored by the Yomiuri Shimbun in the twentieth century emphasised this competitive aspect, which was part of the negotiated match conditions.

A game which if lost would result in a shift in the handicap is called a kadoban (corner game). This term is also now used in the titleholder system, for a game the loss of which loses the whole match (for example 2-3 down in a best-of-seven match, the next game will be a kadoban). Cf. match point in tennis.

Over a ten-game match, the worse possibility arises of being beaten down twice. In confrontations between top players, under the older etiquette players were spared the embarrassment, for the series would be suspended. Newspaper sponsors could be less accommodating.

The distinction between classical jubango and just any ten-game challenge match therefore lies in the drafting of the specific beating-down arrangements.
