= Tamejiro Suzuki =

Japanese Go player

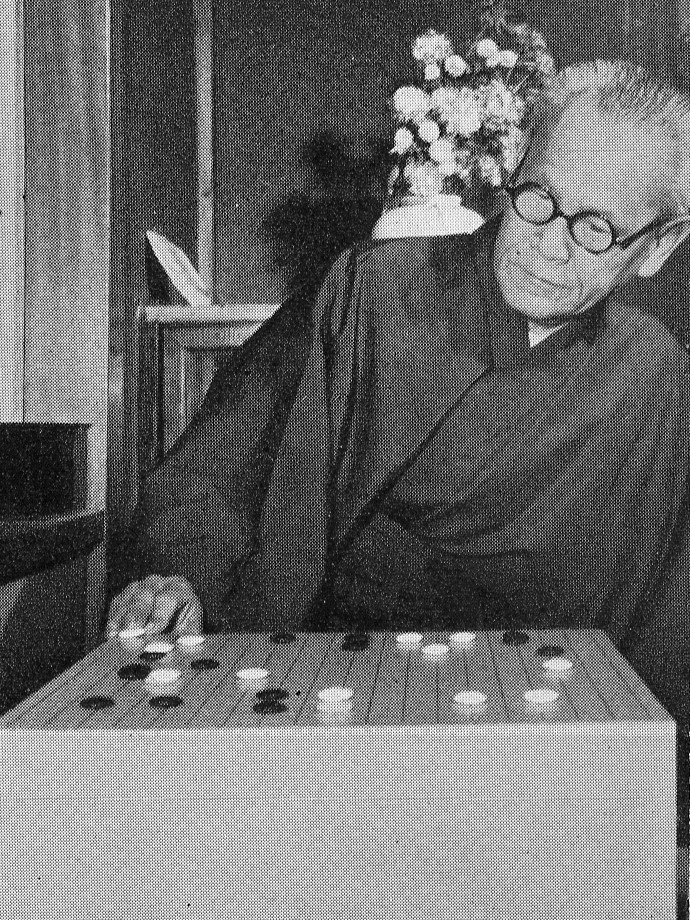

Personal information
- Native name: 鈴木 為次郎 (Japanese)
- Full name: Tamejiro Suzuki
- Born: May 24, 1883 Kariya, Japan
- Died: November 20, 1960 (aged 77)

Sport
- Teacher: Honinbo Shuei, Iwasaki Kenzo
- Rank: 8 dan
- Affiliation: Nihon Ki-in, Kiseisha, Keiinsha

Tamejiro Suzuki (鈴木 為次郎, Suzuki Tamejirō; May 24, 1883 - November 20, 1960) was a professional 8 dan Go player.

== Biography ==
Suzuki was a pupil of Iwasaki Kenzo from 1894, and later studied under Honinbo Shuei. In 1909, Suzuki defeated Kensaku Segoe in a series of 6 matches, of which he lost 2, and was promoted to the rank of 4 dan in 1912. Although he joined the Nihon Ki-in when it was founded in 1924, he left to partake in the splinter groups: the Kiseisha and the Keiinsha. In addition, he joined the Hiseikai, a tournament group of five players, with the others being Chiyotaro Onoda, Kensaku Segoe, Dohei Takabe and Karigane Junichi. Suzuki obtained the rank of 8 dan in 1942.

Suzuki's most famous pupil was Minoru Kitani, though others he tutored include Dogen Handa, Goro Suzuki, Riichi Sekiyama, Toshihiro Shimamura and Masaharu Suzuki.
