= Yasumasa Hane =

Japanese Go player

Personal information
- Native name: 羽根泰正 (Japanese)
- Full name: Yasumasa Hane
- Born: June 25, 1944 (age 82) Mie, Japan

Sport
- Rank: 9 dan
- Affiliation: Nihon Ki-in, Nagoya branch

Yasumasa Hane (羽根 泰正, Hane Yasumasa; born June 25, 1944) is a professional Go player.

Hane was one of the best players in the Nagoya branch of the Nihon Ki-in during his peak. He is probably better known for being the father of the former Kisei holder, Naoki Hane. He was also known as a major contributor in the development of Chinese fuseki. He was taught Go by Shimamura Toshihiro, and currently teaches his son, Naoki, along with Asano Yasuko and Kaori Aoba.

== Titles & runners-up ==
Title	Years Held
Current	5
(Japan) Oza	1990
(Japan) Okan	1972, 1978, 1983, 1992

Title	Years Lost
Current	12
(Japan) Oza	1989, 1991
(Japan) Okan	1974, 1975, 1979, 1982, 1984, 1986, 1990, 1991, 1993, 1995
Defunct	1
(Japan) Shin-Ei	1973
