= Hideki Matsuoka =

Japanese Go player

Personal information
- Native name: 松岡秀樹 (Japanese); マツオカヒデキ (Japanese)
- Full name: Hideki Matsuoka
- Born: March 8, 1968 (age 58) Ichinomiya, Japan

Sport
- Turned pro: 1987
- Teacher: Tsuchida Masamitsu
- Rank: 9 dan
- Affiliation: Nihon Ki-in; Nagoya branch

Hideki Matsuoka (松岡秀樹, Matsuoka Hideki; born March 8, 1968) is a professional Go player.

== Biography ==
Hideki Matsuoka became a professional in 1987. In 2012 he was promoted to 9 dan. He was runner up in 2001 for the 42nd Okan. He won the 47th Okan in 2006, his first title. He won his 400th career game in 2003.

== Titles & runners-up ==
Title	Years Held
Current	1
(Japan) Okan	2006
Total	1

Title	Years Lost
Current	2
(Japan) Okan	2001, 2007
Total	2
