= Go World =

Japanese Go magazine

Go World was an English-language magazine about the game of go, published in Japan by Ishi Press and Kiseido Publishing Company from 1977 through 2012. The magazine was published on a semi-annual basis.

== History and profile ==
Go World was first published in May 1977, and was published continuously until 2012 with an interruption between Summer 1992 and Autumn 1993. Each issue, on average 64 pages, contained extended commentaries on top title matches, world go news, problem sets, and articles on various aspects of the game. Numerous title match games from this period can be found in Tournament Go 1992. In total 129 issues were published.

Go World issues #1-129 are available as full-text indexed PDF documents from Kiseido Digital through their Go World Archive product.
