= Hiroshi Yamashiro =

Japanese Go player

Personal information
- Native name: 山城宏 (Japanese)
- Full name: Hiroshi Yamashiro
- Born: August 12, 1958 (age 67) Yamaguchi, Japan

Sport
- Turned pro: 1972
- Teacher: Toshihiro Shimamura
- Rank: 9 dan
- Affiliation: Nihon Ki-in

Hiroshi Yamashiro (山城宏, Yamashiro Hiroshi; born August 12, 1958) is a professional Go player.

== Biography ==
Yamashiro grew up with Go, as he became a professional in 1972. He eventually joined the Nagoya branch of the Nihon Ki-in. He has challenged for many of Japan's biggest titles, but he has not won any of them. He became a 9 dan in 1985, after winning the Okan, but has not won any other titles.

== Titles and runners-up ==
Domestic
Title	Wins	Runners-up
Kisei		1 (1992)
Honinbo		3 (1986, 1987, 1993)
Tengen		1 (1992)
Oza		1 (1984)
Shinjin-O		1 (1979)
Okan	16 (1977, 1981, 1982, 1984–1987, 1992–1996, 2000, 2001, 2005, 2010)	11 (1978, 1983, 1988, 1997, 1998, 2002, 2004, 2006, 2008, 2009, 2011)
Total	16	18
