= Masamitsu Tsuchida =

Japanese Go player

Personal information
- Native name: 土田 正光 (Japanese)
- Full name: Masamitsu Tsuchida
- Born: August 1, 1944 (age 81) Gifu Prefecture, Japan

Sport
- Turned pro: 1961
- Teacher: Kitani Minoru
- Rank: 9 dan
- Affiliation: Nihon Ki-in

Masamitsu Tsuchida (土田 正光, Tsuchida Masamitsu; born 1944) is a professional Japanese 9 dan Go player.

In 1961, Tsuchida became a pupil at the dojo of Minoru Kitani, and reached 9 dan in 1979. His pupils at the Nihon Ki-in have included Hideki Matsuoka, Masaki Ogata and Yoshika Mizuno. Tsuchida is an affiliate of the Nihon Ki-in in Nagoya, Japan.
