= Hon'inbō Dōsaku =

Japanese Go player

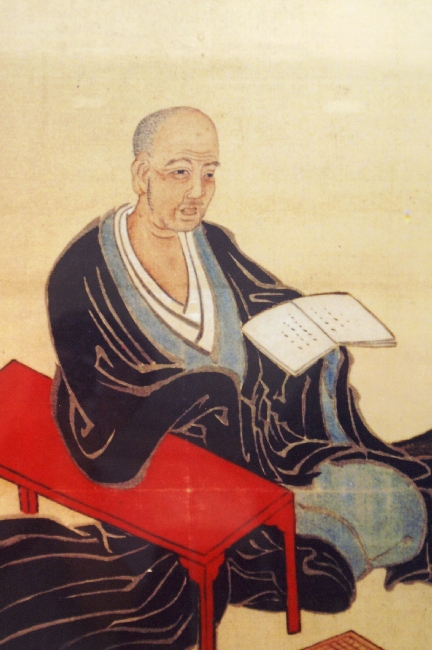

Personal information
- Native name: 本因坊 道策 (Japanese)
- Full name: Hon'inbō Dōsaku
- Born: 1645 Ōda, Japan
- Died: 22 April 1702 (aged 56–57)

Sport
- Teacher: Hon'inbō Dōetsu
- Rank: 9 dan

Hon'inbō Dōsaku (本因坊 道策, 1645–1702), born Yamazaki Sanjirō (Japanese: 山崎 三次郎), was a professional Go player.

== Biography ==
Dōsaku was one of the greatest Go players in history. He was born in the Iwami Province of Japan and studied Go in the Hon'inbō school, becoming Meijin at a very young age.

Dōsaku was the fourth Hon'inbō by the time he was 32, and the fourth Meijin by the time he was 33. He started to learn Go at 7. Dōsaku was so strong by the time he was in his early 20s that even if someone played the first move, he would always win. Rumors were that he was two stones stronger than any other Go player. This was due to his deep thinking and next-level tactics. He laid the foundation for opening strategy in the Golden Period.

== Becoming Meijin by fiat ==
Only a short time after receiving the Head of the Hon'inbō school he was given the post of Meijin in recognition of his unrivaled strength. On one account, this controversial appointment (which deprived Yasui Sanchi of his official positions) was handled by the Jisha-bugyō by summoning a meeting of all concerned parties, including the shogidokoro Ōhashi Sōkei. Sanchi did not attend, and the change of Meijin-godokoro was agreed on unanimously. The ground for this decision was the match of 20 games played between Hon'inbō Dōetsu and Sanchi, for which Dōsaku probably acted as Dōetsu's second on adjournments.

== Games ==
By the time he was 32, he was already head of the Hon'inbō school and placed at the top of the official hierarchy. It has been suggested that the true level of his playing strength was never really tested, given the distance between him and his nearest rivals. The evidence of his contributions is in the legacy of games, known to us by the kifu records.

Two of his famous games are the Jan. 5th, 1684 defeat by one point in a two-stone game (his "life-time masterpiece") and the 1670 castle go game when his opponent opened at tengen, the central point, which was a victory. These were both against members of the Yasui house. Over 150 games of his are known.

== Theoretician ==
Dōsaku is also well remembered for his contributions to Go theory. He took advantage of overconcentration also known as korigatachi, making that henceforth one of the key theoretical errors that players avoided. Tewari analysis, a systematic if rather tricky tool of analysis of efficiency of sequences, is also attributed to him; as is the strategy of amashi.

In playing Peichin Hamahika from the Ryukyu Islands, in 1682, he gave a practical demonstration of his theories, winning easily when giving a four-stone handicap. This game is a textbook piece and is still frequently cited. (The first game he won by 14; the second game on the same day was also recorded and he lost by a small margin, which may naturally mean that he had nothing to prove and was being diplomatic.) Hamahika remained in Japan for some time afterward, studying Dōsaku's games closely; before his departure he petitioned for and was granted an official diploma, personally endorsed by Dōsaku in his capacity as Meijin-Godokoro.

In the field of joseki, he innovated with the three-point low pincer, a more strategic play than the two-point low pincer favoured in particular by the players of the Yasui house.

== Pupils ==
He taught Ogawa Dōteki, Sayama Sakugen, Hoshiai Hasseki, Kumagaya Honseki, and Kuwabara Dōsetsu. All but one died young, in their early twenties, and the Honinbo house faced a period of rebuilding. Dōsetsu became the Inoue house head. The young Hon'inbō Dōchi carried on the tradition.

== Notes ==
| Preceded by Yasui Sanchi | Meijin; 1677–1702 | Succeeded by Inoue Dōsetsu Inseki |
| Preceded by Hon'inbō Dōetsu | Hon'inbō; 1677–1702 | Succeeded by Hon'inbō Dōchi |
