= Titleholder system =

The titleholder system is the most common type of structure used in professional tournaments in the game of go and shogi.

== Overview ==
In practice these events almost always are based in East Asian countries with a professional system: in Japan for go and shogi, and in China, South Korea and Taiwan for go. The system originated from competitions sponsored by Japanese newspapers, and has the effect that major events are spread out over a whole year of preliminaries, with a matchplay final that takes place over a month or two. While this makes tournaments slow-moving and diffuse by the standards of some other mind sports, rather than happening in a single place over a short time span, the system is well entrenched. The sponsoring newspapers can fill a daily column easily throughout the year, while the players can juggle commitments to a number of tournaments and outside interests by asking for scheduling that fits in everything.

Each of the major events has a complicated set of qualifying rounds to select a challenger. The qualifying system is a long series of single-elimination tournaments which may be combined with separate round-robin (league) systems. The single elimination tournaments involve lower-ranked pros, who are met with higher-ranked pros in later stages. The whole system is designed to produce a single challenger, who then goes on to play the titleholder. The titleholder is the previous year's winner of the tournament in interest, who will not have participated in the event up to this point. The final match of the titleholder and the challenger is either a best-of-seven or a best-of-five. Each game may be scheduled in a different city. Cities are chosen often in one country where the organizer operates but not limited to. For example for the Kisei tournament of go in Japan, the first game is often played outside Japan, for example in Europe or North America, to attract attention. The match then settles into a schedule of a game every two weeks or one week. The games take one day or two days to finish today. In the past it took longer; for Meijinsen of shogi in Japan, its earliest final games were designed to take three days.

The winner of the title match then enters the record books, and returns to defend the title the following year (cases where the title is for some reason not defended have been very rare). The most common measure of a top go and shogi player's success, in Japan at least, is the total number of titles accumulated.

Each titleholder system tournament allows its latest winner of the tournament to be styled with the name (title). Some but not every tournament allows its second latest winner to be styled ex-Title for one year and only. For example Ryu-oh tournament of shogi in Japan admits its winner in the previous year to be styled Zen-ryu-oh. Each tournament may have its own lifetime title qualification which gives the right to be styled Lifetime Title to the player who has accumulated wins at that tournament certain times. For example the Kisei tournament in Japan, the qualified player may be styled Eisei Kisei. It is often rare for active players to be styled with their lifetime titles, though it has happened multiple times, specially for aged notable players including Yasuharu Oyama.

== Other systems ==
In go, the first titleholder system of the modern pattern was the Honinbo tournament. Before that was introduced in the early 1940s, other systems used were the win-and-continue system, which has the advantage of low organisational overheads, and high-profile jubango. There has been no jubango since 1960, but win-and-continue systems are used in South Korea. Teams matches were also popular in the 1920s.

The introduction of international go events led to the adoption of new systems for those, mostly based on knockout rounds, and international titles are typically not awarded under the titleholder system. That is, the holder has to compete in the event's earlier stages, a system akin to the way tennis tournaments do it, with the champion perhaps avoiding preliminaries and being seeded into the final stages.
