= Oshirogo =

Oshirogo (御城碁 "castle Go") or castle games were official matches of high-level Go played in Japan during the Edo period, usually in the castles of the shōgun. Players were mostly from the four go houses.

Matches were played in the shōgun's presence. With the passage of the years, this became a formality: the players would replay a game that had already been played, and the shōgun would often be represented by an official, rather than attend himself. The games themselves were, though, bitterly contested, since the castle games had a major effect on the prestige of the four houses. Throughout the Tokugawa shogunate there was an ongoing struggle to take control of the official positions of Meijin and godokoro.

== Ceremonial hierarchy ==
The games were held in the kuroshoin, the court library hall, following a strict spatial hierarchy of seating: the shōgun occupied the highest position in the room, his counsellors were seated opposite him, and the Go and shogi players were placed behind the master of ceremonies. Contemporary records of the ceremony, such as the Oshirogofu, document this positioning of bodies according to rank in explicit detail.

== The shitauchi (uchiuchi) practice ==
From 1672, the ceremony incorporated a practice known as shitauchi (also called uchiuchi): because results had to be submitted to the official record only after the matches at the castle were concluded, and because full games could not reliably be completed within the ceremonial time available, games were first played and recorded privately in advance, then reproduced move by move before the shōgun. Surviving match records, such as the partial record of the 1677 match between Hon'inbō Dōsaku and Yasui Chitetsu, reflect this practice, offering only a descriptive account of the order and positioning of pieces rather than a narrative record of play.

In its earliest form, the compromise was partial: only the first half of a game was reproduced from memory, while the second half was played live before the shōgun. Ceremonial overruns were not unheard of even outside this system: in 1673, a match between Yasui Sanchi and Hon'inbō Dōetsu failed to conclude within the allotted time and had to be finished outside the castle, the first recorded instance of this kind, remembered in later accounts as an "unpleasant" precedent, though further matches were subsequently played elsewhere when necessary, provided the shōgun was not kept waiting. Then, in 1697, a separate match again failed to conclude in time under the partial-reproduction system. Rather than reverting to a fully live format, the practice moved in the opposite direction: from that point on, games came to be reproduced in their entirety before the shōgun.

Hundreds of game records of the castle games survive; a large collection was edited by Kensaku Segoe.

The game series was suspended in 1862 as the political situation became tense. Apart from one 1863 game between Hayashi Hakuei and Yasui Sanei, it was never resumed.
