= Go game record =

Written record of a Go game

A Go game record is an archival record for a game of Go.

In most of East Asia, the record for a game of Go (or another abstract strategy game) is literally called "board game record" (棋譜 or a derivative). In Japanese it is called kifu (棋譜), in Standard Chinese qípǔ (simplified Chinese: 棋谱; traditional Chinese: 棋譜), and in Korean gibo (hangul: 기보, hanja: 棋譜).

Go records traditionally recorded games on a grid diagram representing the playing board, marking the plays on the stones by numbers. Stones placed before play begins are unnumbered.

== History ==
The earliest surviving Go game records are collected in the book Wangyou Qingle Ji (Chinese: 忘憂清樂集; lit. 'Forget Worry Pure Happy Collection'), written by Li Yimin (Chinese: 李逸民) around 1100 AD (Song dynasty).

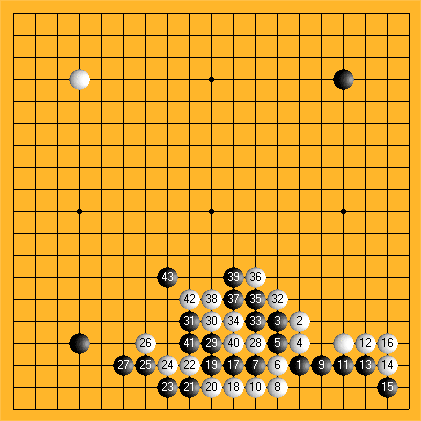
A recording of Wang Jixin's game v. Yushan Laoyu (Ancient China, Tang dynasty). Expand for a clearer view. Note that the moves are numbered consecutively. At the time, the four unmarked moves were pre-played in a position known as a Cross Game.

A large corpus – many thousands of games – of kifu records from the Edo period have survived. A small proportion were published in book form; strong players used to make their own copies of games by hand to study. This accounts for one feature of the records passed down: they often omit much of the endgame, since for a strong player reconstructing the smaller endgame plays is routine. This explains the survival of some games in different versions and possible discrepancies in the final margin.

Early Western Go players found the method of kifu inconvenient, probably because as chess players they were more familiar with algebraic notation and because as new players they found it difficult to locate moves. But they quickly discovered the advantages of kifu-style notation—as much as an entire game can be visually displayed in one diagram—and now virtually all Go books and magazines use some modification of the kifu to display games, variations and problems. While a typical piece of chess literature is in algebraic notation punctuated by occasional diagrams, Go literature mostly consists of diagrams with a sequence of plays marked, and prose commentary.

The pioneering European player Oskar Korschelt disliked kifus because nineteenth century kifus always used Chinese numerals, which are indeed difficult to read unless one is familiar with them. Numbering in that style continued until 1945, having been popular in the 1930s on the basis of nationalist feeling in Japan. (Hindu–Arabic numerals were also used.) In Japanese Go books, when unoccupied points of the board are mentioned in the commentary, they are usually labelled by hiragana (in iroha order) to this day.

== Use ==
The playing-through on a Go board of a game record given as a kifu on a single diagram is still a little taxing for a beginner player, because each move has to be searched for visually. An amateur dan player would expect to play through a game of normal length in around 20 minutes. A player of professional level would take ten minutes, and could easily sight-read a professional game from the kifu. Stronger players can locate plays more easily because they often know where the next move is likely to be found.

In most games, a small number of plays are at intersections that were previously occupied (this happens, for example, during a ko fight). Annotations by the side of the kifu give this information, usually in the form '57 at 51' or something comparable, indicating that move 57 occurred at the location formerly held by move 51. Game records are usually completed by information on the players' ranks, the date and competition data: location, winning player, and margin of victory.

Many of the most important games are now available in machine-readable form, using one of a small number of digital file formats. This has great advantages in terms of ease of playing through games and lends itself well to database storage and archival. The common opinion is that playing games through on a board (rather than computer monitor) from a printed record is a qualitatively different–and preferred–experience. Much importance is given to the sensual aspects of the game: the heft of the game board, the players' viewing angle of the board, the feel of the stones, the sound of the stones when placed.

== Other notations ==
There is no other universally-recognised notation comparable to algebraic chess notation for Go. There are several methods in use, including:

- Using chess-like notation, so (on a 19x19 board) points are named a–t (i is excluded) for one axis, and 1-19 for the other.
- A similar system using Japanese numerals instead of letters.
- Using numbers for both axes, e.g. 3-4 is on the third row and fourth column from a corner.
- Pierre Audouard devised an elegant system using a letter a, b, c or d to designate the reference corner, plus one or two numbers to indicate the position relative to the corner. An equivalent system was used in ancient Chinese texts.

Since the Go board is symmetrical with no particular sides, it makes no difference which corner is used as the reference point from which to count coordinates, so long as the same corner is used for the entire game.

== Computer file formats ==
File formats are used to record the moves of a game or for demonstrations, game reviews and tsumego (Go problems). The most popular file format is Smart Game Format and most Go programs can use this format.

Kifus are not written in a file format for computers but are a written or printed diagrammatic record of a game.

== See also ==
- Board game record
