= Nobuaki Maeda =

Japanese Go player

Maeda Nobuaki (前田 陳爾, 22 November 1907 – 3 July 1975) was a Japanese professional 9 dan go player, a disciple of Honinbo Shusai, and a member of the Nihon Ki-in, the main organizational body for go in Japan. His own disciples were Norio Kudo, Yusuke Oeda, Shioiri Itsuzo, Nagahara Yoshiaki, and Morikawa Masao.

Maeda reached the highest professional rank, 9 dan, in 1963, but never achieved the consistent record of tournament success that marks the truly elite player. Maeda is famous today principally for his series of tsume-go (problem) collections, which gained him the honorary nickname "god of tsume-go." It is said that he composed a problem a day for 40 years. Many of these problems are considered especially beautiful, ingenious, or instructive.

Maeda is also remembered for his presumed role in one of the most sensational and controversial games of the 20th century: the 1933 challenge game between his teacher, Honinbo Shusai, and the Chinese prodigy Go Seigen (Wu Qingyuan). It has long been believed that the exquisite move (W160) that allowed Shusai to overturn Go's lead in the game was actually discovered by Maeda in a study session during one of the game's many adjournments. Maeda at times hinted that this was the case, but in later years would neither confirm nor deny it when asked. It may be assumed that if Maeda was indeed the author of the move, he would decline to confirm it in order to honor the long-standing Japanese professional tradition of respect for one's teacher, thus preserving Shusai's reputation.

Go Seigen v. Honinbo Shusai (white), W160=$\triangle$

== Writings ==
- Maeda, Nobuaki (2008). 前田詰碁集 (in Japanese). 東京創元社. ISBN 978-4-488-00021-9.
