= Godokoro =

Godokoro (碁所, godokoro) is a title that was given in Japan from the beginning of the Edo period until the Meiji Restoration. In that period it was the highest official standing that could be attained by a go player. Literally it is a metonym, meaning the 'go office'. The title was created by Tokugawa Ieyasu and was given by the Jisha-bugyō (Commissioner of Temples and Shrines). The Godokoro was required to be a Meijin and to be the best player in the land.

The Godokoro was responsible for approving rank promotions, mediating disputes between the Four go houses, being a Go tutor to the shōgun, approving terms of challenge matches, and keeping the Go world running smoothly. The position was a lifetime commitment because the man who held the position was excused from playing any games that would cause him to lose the position of Godokoro or Meijin.

== Vacancies and succession disputes ==
The position was not always filled. After Hon'inbō Dōchi's tenure (1721–1727), the office remained vacant until 1770, when a young player named Satsugen, who had become Meijin three years earlier, took up the post; his tenure coincided with a marked rise in the popularity of the annual Castle Games. After Satsugen, the position again became vacant, despite the continued presence of exceptionally strong players.

Disputes over the title could also disrupt the ceremony itself. In 1674, a dispute between Hon'inbō Dōetsu and Yasui Santetsu nearly escalated seriously: Santetsu attempted to avoid their match by claiming illness, and Dōetsu responded in kind by claiming to have been poisoned, feigning chest spasms once it became clear Santetsu had made no real attempt on his life. The two other house heads, Yasui Sanchi and Ōhashi Sōkei, had to intervene, reminding both men of the privilege of playing before the shōgun; that year is recorded as one of the rare occasions on which the shōgun witnessed the ceremony in its entirety, an implicit indication that in most years he did not attend in full.
