= Riichi Sekiyama =

Japanese Go player

Personal information
- Native name: 関山利一 (Japanese)
- Born: December 23, 1909 Hyōgo, Japan
- Died: January 15, 1970 (aged 60)

Sport
- Turned pro: 1925
- Teacher: Tamejiro Suzuki
- Rank: 9 dan

Riichi Sekiyama (関山利一, Sekiyama Riichi, December 23, 1909 – January 15, 1970) was a Japanese professional go player. Born in Hyogo, Riichi became a student of Tamejiro Suzuki in 1924 and turned professional a year later in 1925. He won the first ever Honinbo title in 1941. However, he was unable to defend his title against Utaro Hashimoto in 1943 and was forced to retire due to health problems. He had several pupils, the most notable being Takeo Kajiwara and Yutaka Shiraishi.

== Titles and runners-up ==
Domestic
Title	Wins	Runners-up
Honinbo	1 (1941)	1 (1943)
Total	1	1
