= Jubango =

Ten-game Go match

Jūbango (十番碁) is a Japanese term for a Go match consisting of ten games which might be ended earlier if agreed by both players. A decisive victory would result in the opponent being 'beaten down' to a lower rank. A player would be beaten down if he fell behind his opponent by four wins in the net score. This would mean a change in the playing terms corresponding to a handicap suitable for a rank difference of one rank. Some notable historical jūbango players are Go Seigen (1914-2014), Kitani Minoru (1909–75), Honinbo Shuei (1852-1907) and Hashimoto Utaro (1907-94).

These matches were usually spread over long time-periods, with gaps of months possible between games. They were also peripatetic (taking place in different venues). Both of these features make them different from modern mind sports matches, which tend to be held over a short time in a definite location. Modern go title matches have adapted these characteristics of a jūbango.

== Traditional format ==
Among other formal matches, the jūbango was a traditional form of contest in the Edo period, where players would undertake such a match against a close rival, with the goal of determining which player was stronger. In that era, top rankings were hard to achieve. The normal starting conditions would be those corresponding to the players being of equal rank, or tagaisen. This means they should alternate with Black and White, this being before the era of komigo. Not all matches were played on tagaisen terms.

If agreed, there was the possibility of playing at a handicap, e.g. Black two games out of three, if one player went far enough ahead. This could be reinforced to one player always taking Black, a handicap equivalent to two professional ranks, in extreme cases. For details see professional go handicaps. An uchikomi jūbango was one in which 'beating down' applied.

== Modern jūbango ==
These conventions were revived and made more precise by a series of high-profile matches in the twentieth century, sponsored by the Yomiuri Shimbun. Between about 1930 and 1960, jūbango included many of the most important games, judged by prestige, in Japanese professional go. After 1960 the annual title matches sponsored by newspapers took over, in the public interest.

The era of jūbango was dominated by Go Seigen, who had an outstanding record in these games against his peers.

After a break of 10 years, a jūbango was held in 2014 from 26 January - 28 September between Gu Li and Lee Sedol, two of the world's leading players. The format of the match was first to 6 wins. The match lasted for eight games and was won by Lee Sedol with 6 wins, 2 losses and no draws. The prize money was ¥5,000,000 (~800,000 USD). Games 1-3 and 5-8 were held in different cities in China. Game 4 was held in Shinan, South Korea.

== See also ==
- List of professional Go tournaments
