= European Go players =

European players of go (board game)

The board game of Go was created in East Asia, and is still dominated by Japan, Korea and China. However, since the late 1900s several high-level players have grown and become active in Europe. Some of them are players from Asia who came to promote the game of go in Europe. Mainly, though, the players were born in Europe, sometimes with strong support from Asian Go professionals, and a few of the Europeans have themselves become professional players.

In general, every country in Europe has its own national federation or association, which is affiliated to the European Go Federation (EGF), and each national body manages the activities linked to the game of go in their own country. The activities are almost exclusively undertaken by volunteers.

== Players by country ==
=== Austria ===
==== Best players ====
- Manfred Wimmer – 1-dan professional player – 2-time European Go Championship winner .
- Helmut Hasibeder – Previous European Champion.

=== Czech Republic ===
==== Best players ====
- Lukáš Podpěra, 7d
- Vladimír Daněk, 6d
- Jan Šimara, 6d
- Jan Prokop, 6d
- Radek Nechanický, 6d

=== Finland ===
==== Best players ====
- Antti Törmänen – 1-dan professional player

=== France ===
==== Best players ====
- Eugène Lim - player from Korea. He was the teacher of the first wave of go players in France.
- Fan Hui - Chinese professional player 2 Dan - Official teacher of the FFG - 6-times Paris Go Tournament winner, and 2006 French Open Champion.
- Motoki Noguchi - Japanese player 6 Dan - 2008 French Open Champion, and 2010 Open Champion.
- Dai Junfu - Chinese player 7 Dan - 2010 Paris Go Tournament winner.
- Patrick Merissert - 1976 European Champion and French Champion from 1971 to 1975.
- fr:André Moussa - 13-times French Champion
- Pierre Colmez - 4-times French Champion, 9 times vice-champion, and 2nd European at the 1984 European Go Championship.
- fr:Jean-François Séailles - 4-times French Champion.
- Farid Ben Malek - 3-times French Champion.
- Jean Michel - twice French Champion.
- Antoine Fenech - 2 titles at "under 12" European Youth Go Championship (EYGC).
- Thomas Debarre - 2010 Champion, 2nd "under 12" at the 2004 EYGC and 2nd "under 18" at the 2008 EYGC.
- Tanguy Le Calvé - European professional player 1 Dan
- Benjamin Dréan-Guenaïzia - 3-times French Champion (2017, 2019, 2024), 2022 European Champion ( European professional player 1 Dan

=== Germany ===
==== Best players ====
- Hans Pietsch - 6 Dan professional player.
- Fritz Dueball - First European Champion (3 titles).
- de:Wichard von Alvensleben - European Champion (4 titles).
- de:Jürgen Mattern - European Champion (8 titles).
- Wolfgang Isele - European Champion (1 title).

=== Hungary ===
==== Best players ====
- Tibor Pocsai - European Champion (1 title)
- Diana Koszegi 1 Dan Professional player - European U18 Champion (2000)
- Pal Balogh 6 Dan - European U18 Champion (2001-2002)
- Csaba Mérő 6 Dan - European U18 Champion (1996), 2003 ING Cup winner and 2003 Paris Go Tournament winner.
- Dominik Bővíz 6 Dan - 8th (1st European) Open European Go Championship 2018, Hungarian Champion (2015)

=== Netherlands ===
==== Best players ====
- Guo Juan – 4-time European Champion .
- Rob Van Zeijst – 3-time European Champion (including youngest European Champion at the age of 19).
- Ronald Schlemper – 2-time European Champion.

=== Romania ===
==== Best players ====
- Catalin Taranu - 5 Dan professional player - 2009 European Champion.
- Robert Mateescu - 1998 European Champion.
- Mihai Serban - 2005 U12 European Champion, 2010 U18 European Champion.
- Alexandru-Petre Pitrop - 2014 U16 European Champion.
- Cristian Pop - 7 Dan
- Cornel Burzo - 7 Dan

=== Russia ===
- Alexander Dinerchtein 3p
- Svetlana Shikshina 3p
- Ilya Shikshin 2p

=== Slovakia ===
- Pavol Lisý 2p – European Champion 2018, 5-time Slovak champion (2010, 2011, 2012, 2013, 2014), winner of first European Professional Qualification tournament in 2014 and thereby first European Go Professional

=== Ukraine ===
- Artem Kachanovskyi 2p
- Andrii Kravets 2p
- Mariya Zakharchenko 1p

=== United Kingdom ===
==== Best players ====
- Matthew Macfadyen – 5-time European Champion.

=== Israel ===
==== Best players ====
- Ali Jabarin – 2-dan professional player – The 2nd European professional, 5-time Israeli Go Champion and winner of the 2009 European Youth Go Championship.

== See also ==
- European Go Championship
- European Youth Go Championship
- European Pair Go Championship
- European Go Federation
- Female Go players
