= European Youth Go Championship =

The European Youth Go Championship (EYGC) is a championship for young players of the board game of Go. It is held annually, and first started in Băile Felix, Romania in 1996. Some winners of the various age groups, such as Diána Kőszegi, have since progressed to become professional Go players.

The championship was divided into two sections until 2010, when it was split into three age groups.

This event is where one can first see the future European Go leaders, such as Ilya Shikshin or Artem Kachanovskyi, respectively first and second in the adult 2010 European Go Championship (EGC).

== History ==
In its very first year, the U-18 group produced two noteworthy prize-winners: Csaba Mérő (the section winner), and the future professional players Svetlana Shikshina (2nd place) and Alexandre Dinerchtein (3rd place).

== Notable prize-winners ==
Other juniors went on to win senior tournaments.

The U-12 winner in 2000 and 2001, Ilya Shikshin, went on to win the adult European Go Championship, in 2007 and 2010.

Notable U-18 winners who progressed to greater things include Csaba Mérő, Alexandr Dinerchtein (record 7-times-winner of the adult EGC) and Diána Kőszegi.

== Awards ==
From 2010 onwards, these are split into 3 sections. They are for U-12s (players aged under 12), U-16s and U-18s.

=== Under 12 ===
Year	Winner	Second	Third	Venue
1996	(France) Antoine Fenech	(Romania) Cosmin Mutu	(Hungary) Csaba Marton	(Romania) Băile Felix
1997	(France) Antoine Fenech	(Russia) Vasilii Shvedov	(Hungary) Pal Balogh	(Slovakia) Bratislava
1998	(Czech Republic) Ondrej Silt	(Netherlands) Tommy Hollmann	(Russia) Natalia Kovaleva	(France) Cannes
1999	(Russia) Natalia Kovaleva	(Russia) Timour Dougine	(Ukraine) Mykhailo Shevchuk	(France) Cannes
2000	(Russia) Ilya Shikshin	(Ukraine) Mykola Gluschenko	(Hungary) Rita Pocsai	(Romania) Sinaia
2001	(Russia) Ilya Shikshin	(Czech Republic) Jan Prokop	(Ukraine) Mykola Gluschenko	(Poland) Ustron
2002	(Ukraine) Andrii Kravets	(Russia) Andrej Kashaev	(Ukraine) Artem Kachanovskyi	(Czech Republic) Prague
2003	(Ukraine) Ihor Zaitsev	(Ukraine) Artem Kachanovskyi	(Czech Republic) Miroslav Sos	(France) Cannes
2004	(Russia) Rafael Samakaev	(France) Thomas Debarre	(Israel) Amir Fragman	(Germany) Cologne
2005	(Romania) Mihai Serban	(Netherlands) Joshua Chao - (Russia) Oleg Kocherov		(Slovakia) Kosice
2006	(Netherlands) Joshua Chao - (Poland) Mateusz Surma		(Russia) Alexandre Matushkin	(Russia) St Petersburg
2007	(Romania) Toma Theodor	(United Kingdom) Chun-Yin Woo	(Russia) Alexandre Vashurov	(Netherlands) Zandvoort
2008	(Ukraine) Yurii Mykhaliuk	(Russia) Nikita Khabazov	(Ukraine) Roman Korolov	(Czech Republic) Mikulov
2009	(Russia) Mikhail Sidorenko	(Russia) Dmitri Miliukyn	(Russia) Dmitrij Medvedev	(Bosnia and Herzegovina) Banja Luka
2010	(United Kingdom) Anson Ng	(Romania) Alexandru Pitrop	(Romania) Silvestru State	(Romania) Sibiu
2011	(Ukraine) Vladyslav Verteletskyi	(Russia) Stepan Popov	(Ukraine) Valerii Krushelnytskyi	(Czech Republic) Brno
2012	(Ukraine) Valerii Krushelnytskyi	(Romania) Silvestru State	(Russia) Valerij Kulishov	(Russia) Saint Petersburg
2013	(Ukraine) Valerii Krushelnytskyi	(Russia) Valerij Kulishov	(Russia) Kim Shakhov	(Hungary) Budapest
2014	(Spain) Oscar Vazquez	(Romania) Denis Dobranis	(Germany) Arved Pittner	(United Kingdom) Bognor Regis
2015	(Romania) Denis Dobranis	(Germany) Arved Pittner	(Russia) Virzhinia Shalneva	(Netherlands) Zandvoort
2016	(Romania) Ioan Alexandru Arsinoaia	(Russia) Virzhinia Shalneva	(Russia) Nikita Prikarev	(Serbia) Palic
2017	(Russia) Ivan Klochikhin	(Romania) Stefan Adrian Rotarita	(Ukraine) Polina Krushelnytska	(France) Grenoble
2018	(Romania) Stefan Adrian Rotarita	(Russia) Artemii Pishchalnikov	(Russia) Artur Gimadiev	(Ukraine) Kyiv
2019	(Ukraine) Vsevolod Ovsiienko	(Russia) Artemii Pishchalnikov	(Russia) Alexej Igonin	(Russia) Moscow
2020	(Ukraine) Vsevolod Ovsiienko	(Russia) Askar Khusainov	(Russia) Egor Lavrov	(Croatia) Stubičke Toplice
2021	(Russia) Vjacheslav Shpakovskij	(Russia) Ruslan Tarasov	(Russia) Artur Gimadiev	Internet
2022	(Hungary) Bende Barcza	(Turkey) Alper Sulak	(Romania) Alexandru-Nicolas Patrascu	(Czech Republic) Prague
2023	(Turkey) Alper Sulak	(United Kingdom) Ryan Zhang	(Hungary) Bende Barcza	(Turkey) Ankara
2024	(Czech Republic) Bartik Dach	(Hungary) Bende Barcza	(United Kingdom) Ryan Zhang	(Germany) Hamburg
2025	(Hungary) Bende Barcza	(Ukraine) Denys Lototskyi	(United Kingdom) Ryan Zhang	(Romania) Vatra Dornei

=== Under 16 ===
This section was created in 2010, after the World Youth Go Championship altered the age categories under competition.

Year	Winner	Second	Third	Place
2010	(Poland) Mateusz Surma	(United Kingdom) Vanessa Wong	(Ukraine) Yurii Mykhaliuk	(Romania) Sibiu
2011	(Poland) Mateusz Surma	(United Kingdom) Vanessa Wong	(Russia) Alexander Vashurov	(Czech Republic) Brno
2012	(Ukraine) Yurii Mykhaliuk	(Russia) Stepan Popov	(Romania) Alexandru-Petre Pitrop	(Russia) Saint Petersburg
2013	(Russia) Stepan Popov	(Romania) Silvestru State	(Russia) Vjacheslav Kajmin	(Hungary) Budapest
2014	(Romania) Alexandru-Petre Pitrop	(Russia) Grigorij Fionin	(Russia) Vjacheslav Kajmin	(United Kingdom) Bognor Regis
2015	(Russia) Vjacheslav Kajmin	(Ukraine) Valerii Krushelnytskyi	(Russia) Stepan Popov	(Netherlands) Zandvoort
2016	(Russia) Vjacheslav Kajmin	(Ukraine) Valerii Krushelnytskyi	(Russia) Kim Shakhov	(Serbia) Palic
2017	(Spain) Oscar Vazquez	(Ukraine) Valerii Krushelnytskyi	(Russia) Kim Shakhov	(France) Grenoble
2018	(Germany) Arved Pittner	(France) Solal Zemor	(Russia) Savva Mezin	(Ukraine) Kyiv
2019	(Russia) Virzhinia Shalneva	(Germany) Arved Pittner	(France) Linh Vu Tu	(Russia) Moscow
2020	(France) Linh Vu Tu	(Russia) Alexandr Muromcev	(Italy) Davide Bernardis	(Croatia) Stubičke Toplice
2021	(Russia) Alexandr Muromcev	(Russia) Egor Lavrov	(Ukraine) Vsevolod Ovsiienko	Internet
2022	(Ukraine) Vsevolod Ovsiienko	(Germany) Yuze Xing	(Ukraine) Anna Melnyk	(Czech Republic) Prague
2023	(Ukraine) Vsevolod Ovsiienko	(Germany) Yuze Xing	(Ukraine) Olesia Malko	(Turkey) Ankara

=== Under 18 ===
Year	Winner	Second	Third	Venue
1996	(Hungary) Csaba Mérő	(Russia) Svetlana Shikshina	(Russia) Alexandre Dinerchtein	(Romania) Băile Felix
1997	(Ukraine) Dmytro Bohatskyi	(Germany) Jonas Fincke	(France) Paul Drouot	(Slovakia) Bratislava
1998	(Ukraine) Dmytro Bohatskyi	(Hungary) Diana Koszegi	(Czech Republic) Martin Kuzela	(France) Cannes
1999	(Russia) Andrei Kulkov	(Hungary) Diana Koszegi	(Netherlands) Merlijn Kuin	(France) Cannes
2000	(Hungary) Diana Koszegi	(Russia) Andrei Kulkov	(Russia) Timur Dugin	(Romania) Sinaia
2001	(Hungary) Pal Balogh	(Hungary) Diana Koszegi	(Czech Republic) Ondrej Silt	(Poland) Ustron
2002	(Hungary) Pal Balogh	(Russia) Timur Dugin	(Russia) Oleg Mezhov	(Czech Republic) Prague
2003	(Russia) Ilya Shikshin	(Russia) Timur Dugin	(France) Antoine Fenech	(France) Cannes
2004	(Czech Republic) Ondrej Silt	(Russia) Ilya Shikshin	(Russia) Igor Nemliy	(Germany) Cologne
2005	(Russia) Timur Dugin	(Ukraine) Bohdan Zhurakovskyi	(Germany) Jun Tarumi - (Russia) Igor Nemly	(Slovakia) Kosice
2006	(Russia) Ilya Shikshin	(Hungary) Rita Pocsai	(France) Thomas Debarre	(Russia) St Petersburg
2007	(Russia) Artem Dugin	(Serbia) Dusan Mitic	(Czech Republic) Ondrej Fidrmuc	(Netherlands) Zandvoort
2008	(Ukraine) Artem Kachanovskyi	(France) Thomas Debarre	(Finland) Javier-A. Savolainen	(Czech Republic) Mikulov
2009	(Israel) Ali Jabarin	(Ukraine) Artem Kachanovskyi	(Serbia) Nikola Mitic - (Austria) Viktor Lin	(Bosnia and Herzegovina) Banja Luka
2010	(Romania) Mihai Serban	(Ukraine) Roman Ruzhanskyi	(Romania) Laura Avram	(Romania) Sibiu
2024	(Germany) Yuze Xing	(Croatia) Stjepan Medak	(Czech Republic) Jan Komin	(Germany) Hamburg
2025	(Ukraine) Olesia Malko	(Romania) Robert-Andrei Grosu	(Croatia) Stjepan Medak	(Romania) Vatra Dornei

=== Under 20 ===
During the 2011 championship of Brno, it was mentioned "under 20" category instead of "under 18"

Year	Winner	Second	Third	Venue
2011	(Slovakia) Pavol Lisy	(Israel) Ali Jabarin	(Germany) Lukas Kraemer	(Czech Republic) Brno
2012	(Czech Republic) Lukas Podpera	(Russia) Alexander Vashurov	(Netherlands) Alexander Eerbeek	(Russia) Saint Petersburg
2013	(Slovakia) Pavol Lisy	(Israel) Ali Jabarin	(Czech Republic) Lukas Podpera	(Hungary) Budapest
2014	(Czech Republic) Lukas Podpera	(Germany) Jonas Welticke	(France) Tanguy Le_Calve	(United Kingdom) Bognor Regis
2015	(Slovakia) Pavol Lisy	(Czech Republic) Lukas Podpera	(France) Tanguy Le_Calve	(Netherlands) Zandvoort
2016	(Russia) Grigorij Fionin	(Poland) Stanislaw Frejlak	(Hungary) Dominik Boviz	(Serbia) Palic
2017	(Russia) Vjacheslav Kajmin	(Russia) Grigorij Fionin	(Russia) Anton Chernykh	(France) Grenoble
2018	(Bulgaria) Sinan Djepov	(Germany) Matias Pankoke	(Romania) Elian_Ioan Grigoriu	(Ukraine) Kyiv
2019	(Russia) Anton Chernykh	(Russia) Grigorij Fionin	(Romania) Elian Ioan Grigoriu	(Russia) Moscow
2020	(Russia) Anton Chernykh	(Bulgaria) Sinan Djepov	(Romania) Elian Ioan Grigoriu	(Croatia) Stubičke Toplice
2021	(Spain) Oscar Vazquez	(Germany) Arved Pittner	(Russia) Savva Mezin	Internet
2022	(Germany) Arved Pittner	(Italy) Davide Bernardis	(Romania) Denis Dobranis	(Czech Republic) Prague
2023	(Romania) Denis Dobranis	(Germany) Arved Pittner	(Turkey) Ufuk Emre Yıldırım	(Turkey) Ankara

== See also ==
- European Go Championship
- European Pair Go Championship
- European Go Federation
- European Go Players
