= Cătălin Țăranu =

Romanian Go player

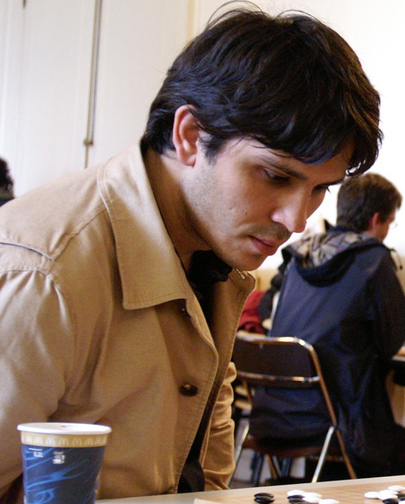
- Țăranu in 2006

Personal information
- Native name: タラヌ・カタリン (Japanese)
- Born: March 31, 1973 (age 53) Romania

Sport
- Teacher: Saijō Masataka
- Rank: 5p
- Affiliation: Nihon Ki-in

Cătălin Țăranu (Romanian: [kətəˈlin tsəˈranu]; Japanese: タラヌ・カタリン, romanized: Taranu Katarin; born March 31, 1973) is a Romanian professional player of the board game of Go, one of the very few from outside Asia.

== Biography ==
Țăranu started learning Go from Cristian Cobeli in 1989, at the age of 16. His first tournament was for players in the 10 to 4 kyū range, when he was a 6 kyū. He won all eight games. He moved up to amateur 1 dan in a year, and just a year later moved up to 4 dan. He started winning small tournaments in Romania around this time. He was invited to Japan by Saijō Masataka in 1995. He quickly joined the Nagoya branch of the Nihon Ki-in and became an insei. After two years, he became the second European (after Manfred Wimmer from Austria in 1978) to pass the professional examination. It took Țăranu just four years to reach 5p (5-dan professional).

He won the European Go Championship in 2008.

He was the president of the Romanian Go Federation from 2009 to 2011.
