= European Pair Go Championship =

The European Pair Go Championship (EPGC) is a European international tournament for amateur Go players under the Pair Go rule, held once a year since 1997.

== History ==
The first European Pair Go Championship was held in 1997.

== Past champions ==
Year	Winner	2nd	3rd
1997	Christoph Gerlach (Germany)	Matthew Macfadyen (United Kingdom)	Rob Kok (Netherlands)
1997	Christoph Gerlach (Germany)	Matthew Macfadyen (United Kingdom)	Pal Sannes (Norway)
1997	Britta Trepcnik (Germany)	Kirsty Healey (United Kingdom)	Renée Frehé (Netherlands)
1997	Britta Trepcnik (Germany)	Kirsty Healey (United Kingdom)	Antje Rapmund (Norway)
1999	Christoph Gerlach (Germany)	Matthew Macfadyen (United Kingdom)	Farid BenMalek (France)
1999	Britta Trepczik (Germany)	Kirsty Healey (United Kingdom)	Marie-Claire Chaine (France)
2000	Franz-Jozef Dickhut (Germany)	Gabor Szabics (Hungary)	Auke Rosendal (Netherlands)
2000	Monika Reimpell (Germany)	Diana Koszegi (Hungary)	Karen Pleit (Netherlands)
2001	Jan Hora (Czech Republic)	Toma Iulian (Romania)	Jan Lubos (Poland)
2001	Martina Simunkova (Czech Republic)	Iacob Liliana (Romania)	Ana Lubos (Poland)
2002	Paul Drouot (France)	Lutz Franke (Germany)	Mihai Petre Bisca (Romania)
2002	Myrtille Cristiani (France)	Daniela Trinks (Germany)	Irina Suciu (Romania)
2003	Tibor Pocsai (Hungary)	Alexei Lazarev (Russia)	Leszek Soldan (Poland)
2003	Rita Pocsai (Hungary)	Natalia Kovaleva (Russia)	Aleksandra Lubos (Poland)
2004	Zbynek Dach (Czech Republic)	Tibor Pocsai (Hungary)	Matthew Cocke (United Kingdom)
2004	Zbynek Dach (Czech Republic)	Benjamin Teuber (Germany)	Matthew Cocke (United Kingdom)
2004	Klara Zaloudkova (Czech Republic)	Rita Pocsai (Hungary)	Natasha Regan (United Kingdom)
2004	Klara Zaloudkova (Czech Republic)	Lisa Ente (Germany)	Natasha Regan (United Kingdom)
2005	Benjamin Teuber (Germany)	Michael Marz (Germany)	Timur Sankin (Russia)
2005	Lisa Ente (Germany)	Manuela Lindemeyer (Germany)	Natalia Kovaleva (Russia)
2006	Oleg Mezhov (Russia)	Marco Firnhaber (Germany)	Matthew Cocke (United Kingdom)
2006	Natalia Kovaleva (Russia)	Daniela Trinks (Germany)	Natasha Regan (United Kingdom)
2007	Dmitrij Surin (Russia)	Viktor Bogdanov (Russia)	Marek Kaminski (Poland)
2007	Natalia Kovaleva (Russia)	Elizaveta Kalsberg (Russia)	Marika Dubiel (Poland)
2008	Dmitrij Surin (Russia)	Ondrej Silt (Czech Republic)	Yurii Pliushch (Ukraine)
2008	Natalia Kovaleva (Russia)	Jana Hricova (Czech Republic)	Mariya Zakharchenko (Ukraine)
2009	Dmitrij Surin (Russia)	Jan Hora (Czech Republic)	Cornel Burzo (Romania)
2009	Natalia Kovaleva (Russia)	Jitka Bartova (Czech Republic)	Sorin Adrian Sora (Romania)
2010	Dmitrij Surin (Russia)	Alexandr Dinershteyn (Russia)	Oleg Mezhov (Russia)
2010	Natalia Kovaleva (Russia)	Elvina Kalsberg (Russia)	Rada Kamysheva (Russia)
2011	Pàl Balogh (Hungary)	Jan Hora (Czech Republic)	Yurii Pliushch (Ukraine)
2011	Rita Pocsai (Hungary)	Jitka Bartova (Czech Republic)	Mariya Zakharchenko (Ukraine)
2012	Alexandr Dinershteyn (Russia)	Jan Hora (Czech Republic)	Dmitri Surin (Russia)
2012	Svetlana Shikshina (Russia)	Klara Zaloudkova (Czech Republic)	Natalia Kovaleva (Russia)
2013	Ilya Shikshin (Russia)	Jan Hora (Czech Republic)	Alexandr Vashurov (Russia)
2013	Svetlana Shikshina (Russia)	Klara Zaloudkova (Czech Republic)	Natalia Kovaleva (Russia)
2014	Ilya Shikshin (Russia)	Benjamin Teuber (Germany)	Dmitrij Surin (Russia)
2014	Svetlana Shikshina (Russia)	Manja Marz (Germany)	Natalia Kovaleva (Russia)
2015	Ilya Shikshin (Russia)	Alexandre Dinerchtein (Russia)	Pal Balogh (Hungary)
2015	Svetlana Shikshina (Russia)	Elvina Kalsberg (Russia)	Rita Pocsai (Hungary)
2016	Ilya Shikshin (Russia)	Pal Balogh (Hungary)	Matias Pankoke (Germany)
2016	Svetlana Shikshina (Russia)	Rita Pocsai (Hungary)	Manja Marz (Germany)
2017	Dimitry Surin (Russia)	Lukas Krämer (Germany)	Ilya Shikshin (Russia)
2017	Natalia Kovaleva (Russia)	Zhao Pei (Germany)	Svetlana Shikshina (Russia)
2018	Alexandre Dinerchtein (Russia)	Benjamin Teubr (Germany)	Dimitrij Surin (Russia)
2018	Aigul Fazulzyanova (Russia)	Lisa Ente (Germany)	Natalia Kovaleva (Russia)
2019	Dimitrij Surin (Russia)	Alexandre Dinerchtein (Russia)	Lukas Krämer (Germany)
2019	Natalia Kovaleva (Russia)	Aigul Fazulzyanova (Russia)	Manja Marz (Germany)
2021	Dimitrij Surin (Russia)	Alexandre Dinerchtein (Russia)	Johannes Obenaus (Germany)
2021	Natalia Kovaleva (Russia)	Aigul Fazulzyanova (Russia)	Manja Marz (Germany)
2022	Benjamin Dréan-Guénaïzia (France)	Lukas Krämer (Germany)	Christopher (Germany)
2022	Ariane Ougier (France)	Zhao Pei (Germany)	Christina (Germany)
2023	Johannes Obenaus (Germany)	Benjamin Dréan-Guénaïzia (France)	Denis Dobranis (Romania)
2023	Manja Marz (Germany)	Ariane Ougier (France)	Laura Avram (Romania)
2024	Milena Bocle (France)	Denis Dobranis (Romania)	Ondrej Silt (Czech Republic)
2024	Florent Labouret (France)	Laura Avram (Romania)	Jitka Bartova (Czech Republic)

== See also ==
- International Amateur Pair Go Championship
- European Go Championship
- Go competitions
- Go players
  - European Go Players
- Rengo
