= European Go Championship =

European championship for the board game Go

The European Go Championship or Congress (EGC) is the annual and main event organised by the European Go Federation for players of the board game Go. It consists of a 2-week open competition, one round per day, making a total of 10 rounds with a champion ultimately emerging – the player with the most (or best) wins. The Congress has taken place in a different European city each year, since the first contest in 1983. During these two weeks, the best Go players in Europe fight for the title of European Champion. The number of participants in recent years has ranged from a low of 290 to a high of 718 players.

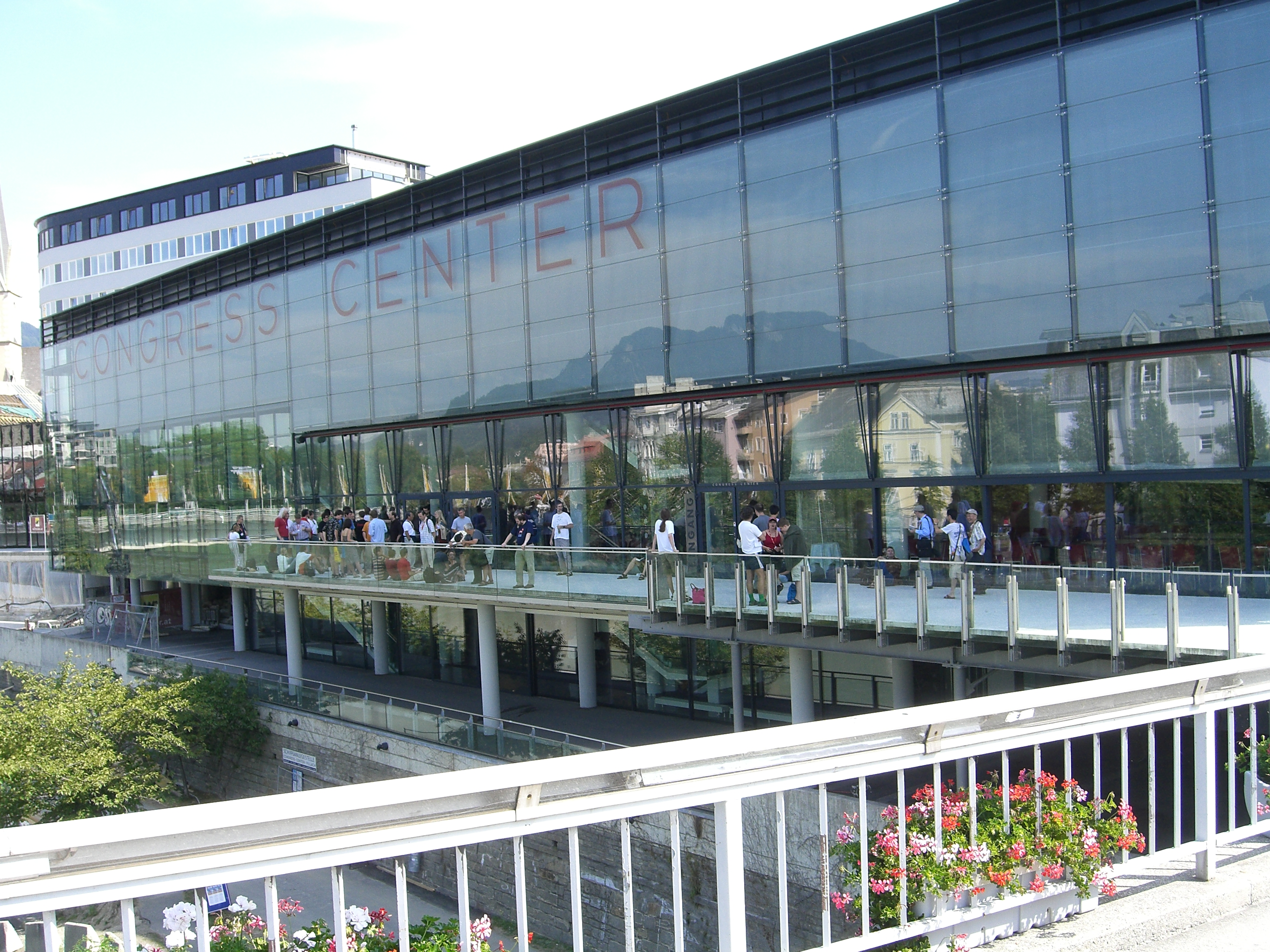
Contestants relaxing at the 'Congress Center Villach', Austria, during the 2007 European Go Championship (EGC)

== History ==
The first European Go Championship was held in 1938. The current annual series begun in 1957, with the first championship held in Cuxhaven, Germany. Germany has been quite dominant at the championships.

In 1961 the 5th European Go Championship was held in August in Baden, where Japanese professional players Kensaku Segoe and Utaro Hashimoto gave exhibitions.

In 1976 European Go Congress was held in Cambridge with 150 European players vying for titles among five separate tournaments which varied the games played, and including a tournament at the game of 'Lightning Go,' where the game must be played far more rapidly than in a traditional match. The festivities were described by United Press International, reporting on the event, as a "two week orgy of go."

In 1977 the 21st championship was held in Rijswijk in the Netherlands. Although not allowed to play in the competition, two Japanese professional players attended and provided instruction and engaged in simultaneous exhibitions. Seminars were given in go theory, computer go and lightning go.

== Recent highlights ==
=== Czech Republic 2005 ===
In Prague, Alexandre Dinerchtein won against Cătălin Țăranu in the 5th round.

=== Italy 2006 ===
In Frascati, Alexandre Dinerchtein lost against the 2001 Champion Andrei Kulkov in the 6th round.

Svetlana Shikshina won the title.

=== Austria 2007 ===
In Villach, Ilya Shikshin won the title, despite losing to Alexandre Dinerchtein in the 8th round.

=== Sweden 2008 ===
In Leksand, Ondrej Silt from the Czech Republic beat Cătălin Țăranu in Round 4. In Round 5, Alexandre Dinerchtein won against the 2006 Champion Svetlana Shikshina. Cătălin Țăranu beat the 2007 Champion Ilya Shikshin in Round 8. The 5-dan Go professional Cătălin Țăranu became the second Romanian player to become European Go Champion.

=== Netherlands 2009 ===
In Groningen, the young 5-dan Thomas Debarre from France defeated Cătălin Țăranu in Round 4. In round 5, the 3-times European Champion from the Netherlands, Rob van Zeijst, lost against Alexandre Dinerchtein. Round 9 saw victory by the 2008 Champion Cătălin Țăranu against Alexandre Dinerchtein. Alexandre Dinerchtein remained ahead on tiebreak to win the title, his seventh time as European go Champion.

=== Finland 2010 ===
In Tampere, as a first act of the championship, Cornel Burzo from Romania beat the reigning champion, the Russian professional Alexandre Dinerchtein. Cătălin Țăranu won against Rob Van Zeijst in the 3rd round. The fourth round featured a very long game between Taranu and Ilya Shikshin. These two players were undefeated since the beginning of this year's competition. Shikshin finally won the game, to continue his consecutive victories (6 winning rounds).

The young Artem Kachanovskyi from Ukraine stopped the winning ascension of Shikshin at the seventh round. The next rounds were a fight for the title for these two players. Kachanovskyi led first by beating Csaba Mérő at the 8th round, and the 2009 European Youth Champion, Ali Jabarin, in the 9th round, but he lost his final game against Kim JungHyeop, a Korean player. Shikshin won the title by beating Cristian Pop in the 8th round and Dinerchtein in the final round. During this tournament, the two leaders won games against Korean players. This is the second European title for Ilya Shikshin.

=== France 2011 ===
The Championship was held at the "University of Bordeaux I" campus in Talence, from July 23 to August 6. The number of registered players exceeded the 800 expected players, meaning already that European Go is healthy. These amateur players were from all European countries, ranked from 30 kyu to 7 dan, professional players from Asia will also participate (e.g. Japan, China and South Korea). The French hosting organisation was the Fédération française de go (FFG). The pre-registration board showed the participation of previous champions and possible future title-holders such as:

- Cătălin Țăranu
- Ilya Shikshin
- Svetlana Shikshina
- Alexandre Dinerchtein
- Artem Kachanovskyi
- Cristian Pop

This edition also accommodated the first Pandanet Go European Team Championship, a new competition where Romania, Hungary, Russia and Ukraine will try to obtain the first title.

As a side-event, a professional competition was held - some games of the China Weiqi League were played.

Yumi Hotta, Hikaru no Go-writer, attended for a conference during the event.

The EGC is reliant on generous international sponsorship. For the third consecutive year, Zhuyeqing Tea - the official sponsor of the Chinese national Go team - are the main sponsor of the Congress.

=== Germany 2012 ===
The 2012 EGC was held by the river Rhine, in the municipal hall of Bonn-Bad Godesberg, from 21 July to 4 August 2012.

=== Poland 2013 ===
Olsztyn in Poland was the host for the 2013 Congress.

=== Romania 2014 ===
The 2014 EGC was held in Sibiu, Romania, a former European Capital of Culture.

=== Czechia 2015 ===
The 2015 EGC was held in Liberec, Czech Republic.

=== Russia 2016 ===
The 2016 EGC was held in Saint Petersburg, Russia.

=== Germany 2017 ===
The 2017 EGC was held in Oberhof, Germany with the highest number of participants in history.

=== Italy 2018 ===
The 2018 EGC was held in Pisa, Italy.

=== Belgium 2019 ===
The 2019 EGC was held in Brussels, Belgium.

=== 2020 and 2021 ===
In both of these years, the EGC did not take place due to the COVID-19 pandemic. The European Championship was held online in its place.

=== Romania 2022 ===
The 64th EGC took place from 23 July to 7 August in Vatra Dornei, Romania.

=== Leipzig/Markkleeberg 2023 ===
The 65th EGC took place from 22 July to 5 August in Markkleeberg, Germany. It had 751 registered participants.

=== Toulouse 2024 ===
The 66th EGC took place from 26 July to 10 August in Toulouse, France.

== Planned Congresses ==
European Go Congresses, at which the European Go Champion is decided, are planned a few years in advance to cater for up to 800 players. Each year, the hosting country's Go association plays a large part in the organisation. Below are the planned future locations.

- 2025 – Warsaw, Poland.

== Past champions ==
As recorded in the European Go Federation web-site:

=== European individual champions ===
Year	Winner	2nd	3rd
1957	Fritz Dueball (West Germany)	Fritz John (West Germany)	Leonard Grebe (Austria)
1958	Fritz Dueball (West Germany)	Lenz	Fritz John (West Germany)
1959	Fritz Dueball (West Germany)	Paech	Kramer
1960	Günter Ciessow (West Germany)	Leonard Grebe (Austria)	Fritz Dueball (West Germany)
1961	Wichard von Alvensleben (West Germany)	Leonard Grebe (Austria)	Fritz Dueball (West Germany)
1962	Wichard von Alvensleben (West Germany)	Jürgen Dueball (West Germany)	Jürgen Mattern (West Germany)
1963	Wichard von Alvensleben (West Germany)	Jürgen Mattern (West Germany)	Max Rebattu (Netherlands)
1964	Wichard von Alvensleben (West Germany)	Jürgen Mattern (West Germany)	Eduard Ekart (Yugoslavia)
1965	Jürgen Mattern (West Germany)	Max Rebattu (Netherlands)	Jürgen Dueball (West Germany)
1966	Jürgen Mattern (West Germany)	Manfred Wimmer (Austria)	Max Rebattu (Netherlands)
1967	Zoran Mutabzija (Yugoslavia)	Manfred Wimmer (Austria)	Max Rebattu (Netherlands)
1968	Jürgen Mattern (West Germany)	Zoran Mutabzija (Yugoslavia)	Jürgen Dueball (West Germany)
1969	Manfred Wimmer (Austria)	Jürgen Mattern (West Germany)	Zoran Mutabzija (Yugoslavia)
1970	Jürgen Mattern (West Germany)	Manfred Wimmer (Austria)	Max Rebattu (Netherlands)
1971	Zoran Mutabzija (Yugoslavia)	Henk de Vries (Netherlands)	Max Rebattu (Netherlands)
1972	Jürgen Mattern (West Germany)	Max Rebattu (Netherlands)	Jon Diamond (United Kingdom)
1973	Jürgen Mattern (West Germany)	Michael Katscher (West Germany)	Zoran Mutabzija (Yugoslavia)
1974	Manfred Wimmer (Austria)	Michael Kitsos (Greece)	Tony Goddard (United Kingdom)
1975	Jürgen Mattern (West Germany)	Manfred Wimmer (Austria)	Patrick Merissert (France)
1976	Patrick Merissert (France)	Tony Goddard (United Kingdom)	Jon Diamond (United Kingdom)
1977	Wolfgang Isele (West Germany)	Helmut Hasibeder (Austria)	Ronald Schlemper (Netherlands)
1978	Helmut Hasibeder (Austria)	Max Rebattu (Netherlands)	Matthew Macfadyen (United Kingdom)
1979	Jürgen Mattern (West Germany)	Ronald Schlemper (Netherlands)	Robert Rehm (Netherlands)
1980	Matthew Macfadyen (United Kingdom)	Jürgen Mattern (West Germany)	André Moussa (France)
1981	Rob van Zeijst (Netherlands)	Helmut Hasibeder (Austria)	Robert Rehm (Netherlands)
1982	Ronald Schlemper (Netherlands)	Robert Rehm (Netherlands)	André Moussa (France)
1983	Janusz Kraszek (Poland)	Terry Stacey (United Kingdom)	Matthew Macfadyen (United Kingdom)
1984	Matthew Macfadyen (United Kingdom)	Pierre Colmez (France)	Egbert Rittner (West Germany)
1984	Matthew Macfadyen (United Kingdom)	Pierre Colmez (France)	Robert Rehm (Netherlands)
1985	Ronald Schlemper (Netherlands)	Matthew Macfadyen (United Kingdom)	Pierre Colmez (France)
1985	Ronald Schlemper (Netherlands)	Matthew Macfadyen (United Kingdom)	André Moussa (France)
1986	Ronald Schlemper (Netherlands)	Frank Janssen (Netherlands)	Donzet Frederic (France)
1986	Ronald Schlemper (Netherlands)	Frank Janssen (Netherlands)	Egbert Rittner (West Germany)
1987	Matthew Macfadyen (United Kingdom)	Aleksey Lazarev (Soviet Union)	Donzet Frederic (France)
1987	Matthew Macfadyen (United Kingdom)	Aleksey Lazarev (Soviet Union)	Rob Van Zeijst (Netherlands)
1988	Tibor Pocsai (Hungary)	Ronald Schlemper (Netherlands)	Valeri Soloviov (Soviet Union)
1989	Matthew Macfadyen (United Kingdom)	Ruslan Sakhabudinov (Soviet Union)	Valeri Soloviov (Soviet Union)
1990	Rob van Zeijst (Netherlands)	Hans Pietsch (West Germany)	Jürgen Mattern (West Germany)
1991	Aleksey Lazarev (Soviet Union)	Gilles van Eeden (Netherlands)	Vladimir Danek (Czech Republic)
1992	Aleksey Lazarev (Russia)	Gilles van Eeden (Netherlands)	Geert Groenen (Netherlands)
1993	Rob van Zeijst (Netherlands)	Juan Guo (Netherlands)	Aleksey Lazarev (Russia)
1994	Juan Guo (Netherlands)	Guangji Shen (Germany)	Manfred Wimmer (Austria)
1995	Juan Guo (Netherlands)	Christoph Gerlach (Germany)	Pierre Colmez (France)
1996	Juan Guo (Netherlands)	Rob van Zeijst (Netherlands)	Laurent Heiser (Luxembourg)
1997	Juan Guo (Netherlands)	Vladimir Danek (Czech Republic)	Pei Zhao (China)
1998	Robert Mateescu (Romania)	Franz-Josef Dickhut (Germany)	Christoph Gerlach (Germany)
1999	Alexandre Dinerchtein (Russia)	Ion Florescu (Romania)	Dmitrij Surin (Russia)
2000	Alexandre Dinerchtein (Russia)	Pei Zhao (Germany)	Franz-Josef Dickhut (Germany)
2001	Andrey Kulkov (Russia)	Christoph Gerlach (Germany)	Emil Nijhuis (Netherlands)
2002	Alexandre Dinerchtein (Russia)	Dmytro Bohatskyi (Ukraine)	Mykhailo Halchenko (Ukraine)
2003	Alexandre Dinerchtein (Russia)	Aleksey Lazarev (Russia)	Cornel Burzo (Romania)
2004	Alexandre Dinerchtein (Russia)	Cătălin Țăranu (Romania)	Cristian Gabriel Pop (Romania)
2005	Alexandre Dinerchtein (Russia)	Cătălin Țăranu (Romania)	Ilja Shikshin (Russia)
2006	Svetlana Shikshina (Russia)	Alexandre Dinerchtein (Russia)	Andrey Kulkov (Russia)
2007	Ilya Shikshin (Russia)	Alexandre Dinerchtein (Russia)	Cristian Gabriel Pop (Romania)
2008	Cătălin Țăranu (Romania)	Alexandre Dinerchtein (Russia)	Ilya Shikshin (Russia)
2009	Alexandre Dinerchtein (Russia)	Cătălin Țăranu (Romania)	Csaba Mérő (Hungary)
2010	Ilya Shikshin (Russia)	Artem Kachanovskyi (Ukraine)	Cătălin Țăranu (Romania)
2011	Ilya Shikshin (Russia)	Cătălin Țăranu (Romania)	Artem Kachanovskyi (Ukraine)
2012	Jan Simara (Czech Republic)	Ilya Shikshin (Russia)	Pavol Lisý (Slovakia)
2013	Hui Fan (France)	Pavol Lisý (Slovakia)	Mateusz Surma (Poland)
2014	Hui Fan (France)	Alexandre Dinerchtein (Russia)	Ilya Shikshin (Russia)
2015	Hui Fan (France)	Ali Jabarin (Israel)	Ilya Shikshin (Russia)
2016	Ilya Shikshin (Russia)	Ali Jabarin (Israel)	Lukáš Podpera (Czech Republic)
2017	Ilya Shikshin (Russia)	Mateusz Surma (Poland)	Artem Kachanovskyi (Ukraine)
2018	Pavol Lisý (Slovakia)	Ilya Shikshin (Russia)	Ali Jabarin (Israel)
2019	Ilya Shikshin (Russia)	Artem Kachanovskyi (Ukraine)	Lukáš Podpera (Czech Republic)
2020	Ilya Shikshin (Russia)	Ali Jabarin (Israel)	Artem Kachanovskyi (Ukraine)
2021	Ilya Shikshin (Russia)	Artem Kachanovskyi (Ukraine)	Ali Jabarin (Israel)
2022	Benjamin Dréan-Guenaïzia (France)	Artem Kachanovskyi (Ukraine)	Fredrik Blomback (Sweden)
2023	Andrii Kravets (Ukraine)	Ali Jabarin (Israel)	Ashe Vázquez (Spain)
2024	Andrii Kravets (Ukraine)	Thomas Debarre (France)	Fredrik Blomback (Sweden)
2025	Mateusz Surma (Poland)	Valerii Krushelnytskyi (Ukraine)	Artem Kachanovskyi (Ukraine)

=== Open European individual champions ===
From 1984, the Championship became open, allowing participants from outside Europe. This attracted strong players from China and Korea, who have regularly finished in the top spots. Until 2010, the highest finishing European national would be declared "European Champion", with the highest finisher of the tournament being declared "European Open Champion"; the latter title was often won by Korean nationals.

From 2011 onwards, the tournament format was changed. The tournament now consists of 7 rounds of MacMahon, followed by a 3-round single elimination knockout between the top 8 eight European nationals. The winner of this knockout is declared European Champion; the player with the most wins after 10 rounds is declared European Open Champion.

Year	Winner	2nd	3rd
1984	Tay-You Hong (South Korea)	Jong-Su Yoo (South Korea)	Matthew Macfadyen (United Kingdom)
1985	Ronald Schlemper (Netherlands)	Matthew Macfadyen (United Kingdom)	Pierre Colmez (France)
1985	Ronald Schlemper (Netherlands)	Matthew Macfadyen (United Kingdom)	André Moussa (France)
1986	Ronald Schlemper (Netherlands)	Frank Janssen (Netherlands)	Donzet Frederic (France)
1986	Ronald Schlemper (Netherlands)	Frank Janssen (Netherlands)	Egbert Rittner (West Germany)
1987	Matthew Macfadyen (United Kingdom)	Alexei Lazarev (Soviet Union)	Donzet Frederic (France)
1987	Matthew Macfadyen (United Kingdom)	Alexei Lazarev (Soviet Union)	Rob Van Zeijst (Netherlands)
1988	Tibor Pocsai (Hungary)	Kazuki Hondo (Japan)	Ronald Schlemper (Netherlands)
1989	Toshiyuki Sogabe (Japan)	Matthew Macfadyen (United Kingdom)	Chikako Nakamura (Japan)
1990	Rob Van Zeijst (Netherlands)	Shu-Tai Zhang (China)	Hans Pietsch (West Germany)
1991	Shu-Tai Zhang (China)	Alexei Lazarev (Soviet Union)	Juan Guo (China)
1992	Takashi Matsumoto (Japan)	Wataru Miyakawa (Japan)	Shu-Tai Zhang (China)
1993	Rob van Zeijst (Netherlands)	Naoyuki Kai (Japan)	Juan Guo (China)
1994	Juan Guo (Netherlands)	Guangji Shen (Germany)	Manfred Wimmer (Austria)
1995	Juan Guo (Netherlands)	Wataru Miyakawa (Japan)	Yasuyuki Sumikura (Japan)
1996	Juan Guo (Netherlands)	Rob van Zeijst (Netherlands)	Hyuk Lee (South Korea)
1997	Hyuk Lee (South Korea)	Wataru Miyakawa (Japan)	Juan Guo (Netherlands)
1998	Hyuk Lee (South Korea)	Robert Mateescu (Romania)	Franz-Josef Dickhut (Germany)
1999	Alexandre Dinerchtein (Russia)	Ion Florescu (Romania)	Dmitrij Surin (Russia)
2000	Hyuk Lee (South Korea)	Alexandre Dinerchtein (Russia)	Pei Zhao (Germany)
2001	Andrei Kulkov (Russia)	Kiyoshi Fujita (Japan)	Christoph Gerlach (Germany)
2002	Alexandre Dinerchtein (Russia)	Dmytro Bohatskyi (Ukraine)	Mykhailo Halchenko (Ukraine)
2003	Seul-Ki Hong (South Korea)	Bi Jang (South Korea)	Sung-Kyun Park (South Korea)
2004	Kwang-Sun Young (South Korea)	Alexandre Dinerchtein (Russia)	Cătălin Țăranu (Romania)
2005	Alexandre Dinerchtein (Russia)	Seok-Bin Cho (South Korea)	Jong-Wook Park (South Korea)
2006	Chi-Seon Park (South Korea)	Ki-Bong Lee (South Korea)	Svetlana Shikshina (Russia)
2007	Seok-Ui Hong (South Korea)	Jong-Wook Park (South Korea)	Seok-Bin Cho (South Korea)
2008	Jong-Wook Park (South Korea)	Seok-Ui Hong (South Korea)	Yu-Cheng Lai (Taiwan)
2009	Eun-Kuk Kim (South Korea)	In-Seong Hwang (South Korea)	Joon-Sang Kim (South Korea)
2010	Ilya Shikshin (Russia)	Artem Kachanovskyi (Ukraine)	Chae-Lim Kim (South Korea)
2011	Young-Sam Kim (South Korea)	Ilya Shikshin (Russia)	Cătălin Țăranu (Romania)
2012	Jun-Hyup Song (South Korea)	Young-Sam Kim (South Korea)	Jan Simara (Czech Republic)
2013	Hui Fan (France)	Antti Tormanen (Finland)	Pavol Lisý (Slovakia)

=== Open European pair champions ===
Year	Winner	2nd	3rd
1992	Cartsen Klaus (Germany)	T.Mark Hall (United Kingdom)	Christoph Gerlach (Germany)
1992	Daniela Trinks (Germany)	Frauke Kuhn (Germany)	Sabine Collin (Germany)
1993	Rob van Zeijst (Netherlands)	Gruang-Ji Shen (China)	Deaconu Lucian (Romania)
1993	Juan Guo (Netherlands)	Zhao Pei (Germany)	Giorgia Lucia (Italy)
1994	Matti Groot (Netherlands)	Guido Tautorat (Germany)	Karsten Ziegler (Germany)
1994	Juan Guo (Netherlands)	Daniela Trinks (Germany)	Britta Trepczik (Germany)
1995	Rob Kok (Netherlands)	Jef Seailles (France)	Robert Mateescu (Romania)
1995	Juan Guo (Netherlands)	Rafaella Giardino (Italy)	Adrian Ghioc (Romania)
1996	Laurent Heiser (Luxembourg)	Julien Roubertie (France)	Hiroshi Shima (Japan)
1996	Hao-Jiang Zou (Luxembourg)	Astrid Gaultier (France)	Keiko Watanabe (Japan)
1997	Hyuk Lee (South Korea)	Olivier Besson (France)	Henk Hollmann (Netherlands)
1997	Juan Guo (Netherlands)	Aude Friren (France)	Kirsten Hollmann (Netherlands)
1998	Wataru Miyakawa (Japan)	Hyuk Lee (South Korea)	Saijo Masataki (Japan)
1998	Wataru Miyakawa (Japan)	Hyuk Lee (South Korea)	Steffi Hebsacker (Germany)
1998	Ruxandra Ilie (Romania)	Svetlana Shikshina (Russia)	Ildar Almouchametov (Russia)
1998	Ruxandra Ilie (Romania)	Svetlana Shikshina (Russia)	Olga Mejova (Russia)
1999	Marcin Wolak (Poland)	Cătălin Țăranu (Romania)	Emil Nijhuis (Netherlands)
1999	Marta Natecz (Poland)	Renee Frehe (Netherlands)	Gaelle Desportes (France)
2000	Dionisia Barrasa (Spain)	?	?
2000	Hong-Mei Fu (Japan)	?	?
2001	Niek van Diepen (Netherlands)	Bela Nagy (Romania)	Emil Nijhuis (Netherlands)
2001	Annemarie Hovingh (Netherlands)	Lisa Ente (Germany)	Yo-Won Choi (Netherlands)
2002	Hirobumi Ohmori (Japan)	Ronald Verhagen (Netherlands)	Joachim Beggerow (Germany)
2002	Olga Mezhova (Russia)	Tabasa Nagai (Japan)	Katrin Bade (Germany)
2003	Sung-Kyun Park (South Korea)	Cornel Burzo (Romania)	Andrey Sovetkin (Russia)
2003	Na-Yeon Kang (South Korea)	Geraldine Paget (France)	Ilsia Samakaeva (Russia)
2004	Piotr Wisthal (Poland)	Lionel Fischer (France)	Christoph Gerlach (Germany)
2004	Alexandra Urban (Hungary)	Helene Alby (France)	Lara Skuppin (Germany)
2005	Dong-Chan Kim (South Korea)	Zbynek Dach (Czech Republic)	Tae-Hyun Kim (South Korea)
2005	Se-Young Kim (South Korea)	Klara Zaloudkova (Czech Republic)	Jong-Uk Park (South Korea)
2006	Christian Gawron (Germany)	Bernd Radmacher (Germany)	?
2006	Monika Reimpell (Germany)	Karen Schomberg (Germany)	?
2007	Yury Pliushch (Ukraine)	?	?
2007	Maria Zakharchenko (Ukraine)	?	?
2008	Seung-Geun Lee (South Korea)	Marc Stoehr (Sweden)	?
2008	Daniela Trinks (Germany)	Meien Kurebayashi (Japan)	?
2009	Siu-Hong Chung (Netherlands)	Liu-Zhi Lin (China)	?
2009	Cheng-Ping Chang (Taiwan)	Juan Guo (Netherlands)	?
2010	Chin-Seok Mok (South Korea)	Ilya Shikshin (Russia)	Tomas Bartonek (Czech Republic)
2010	Klara Zaloudkova (Czech Republic)	Laura Avram (Romania)	Ha-Jin Lee (South Korea)
2011	Jan Simara (Czech Republic)	Cornel Burzo (Romania)	Sung Kim (South Korea)
2011	Rita Pocsai (Hungary)	Adelina Sora (Romania)	Klara Zaloudkova (Czech Republic)
2012	Manja Marz (Germany)	Jan Simara (Czech Republic)	Jesse Savo (Finland)
2012	Huai-Yi Chang (Taiwan)	Barbara Knauf (Germany)	Laura Avram (Romania)
2013	Cezary Czernecki (Poland)	Young-Long Park (South Korea)	Bin Lu (China)
2013	Ha-Jin Lee (South Korea)	Agnieszka Kacprzyk (Poland)	Ting Li (China)

== See also ==
- European Pair Go Championship
