= Capture go =

Abstract strategy board game

Capture go is a simplified variation of the Go board game established primarily as an introduction to the rules and concepts of Go. Known also as the capture game, first capture go, and Atari go, it was first introduced by Yasuda Yasutoshi, an 8 dan professional Go player who is very active in teaching Go to children and adults alike.

Capture go follows the same rules as traditional go, but a victory is achieved by simply capturing one or more stones, the number of stones required for victory being agreed prior to the start of the game. A beginner may play several games of single-stone capture go before moving on to two or three stones.

== See also ==
- International Go Federation
- Go variants
