= Ilya Shikshin =

Russian Go player (born 1990)

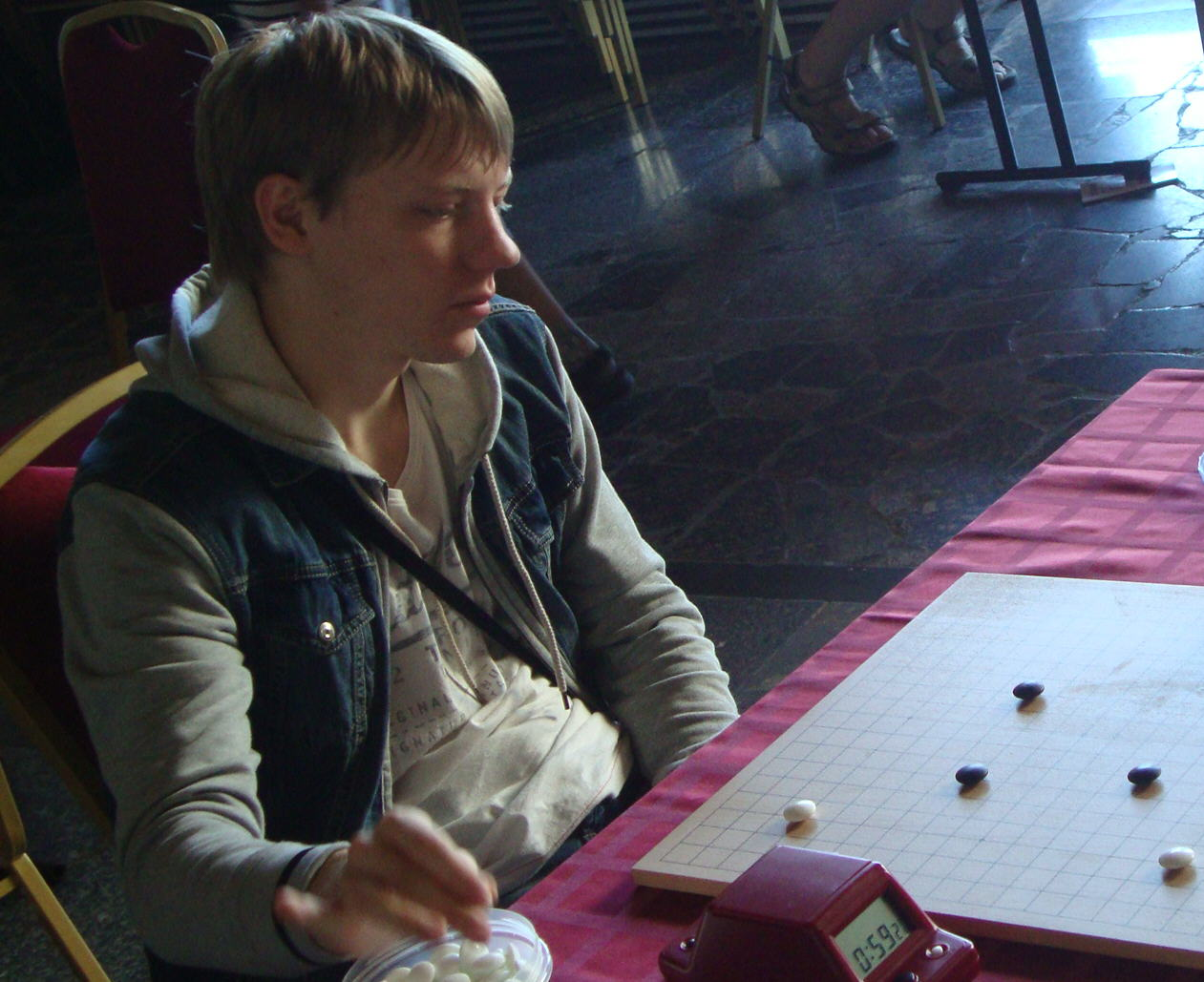

Personal information
- Born: May 7, 1990 (age 36) Kazan, Russian SFSR, Soviet Union

Sport
- Turned pro: 2015
- Teacher: Valery Shikshin
- Rank: 4-dan pro
- Affiliation: European Go Federation

Ilya Valerievich Shikshin (Илья Валерьевич Шикшин, born 7 May 1990) is a 4-dan professional Go player from Russia. He was the fourth player to be awarded professional status by the European Go Federation, in 2015. He has won 27 major European titles including the European Championship, European Team Championship and European Pair Go Championship.

== Biography ==
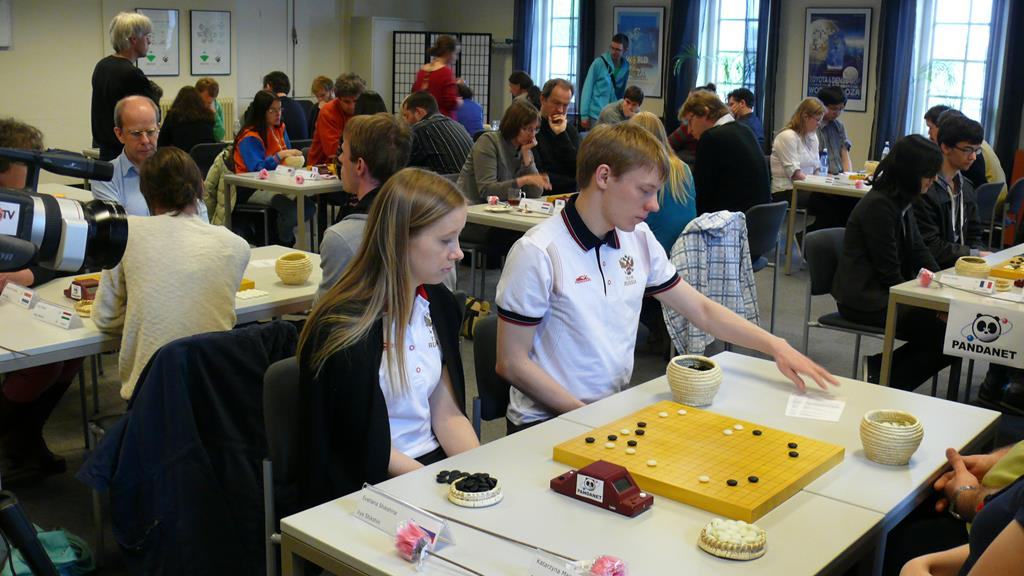
Shikshin competing at a pair go tournament with his sister in 2013

Shikshin was born on 7 May 1990, in Kazan, Soviet Union. He began playing go at the age of 5 along with his sister Svetlana Shikshina, being tutored by his father, go teacher Valery Shikshin. In 2000, Shikshin won the European Under 12 Championship in Sinaia, Romania while holding the rank of 2-kyu. He reached the rank of 5-dan amateur two years later, after placing 4th in the European Youth Go Championship in Prague, Czech Republic.

Shikshin was promoted to 6-dan amateur in 2005, two years later he was promoted to 7-dan amateur (the highest amateur rank) after winning the Russian, European Individual and European Team Championships within the same year. Shikshin later made multiple trips to South Korea, where he studied as an Insei under Chun Poong Jho 9-dan professional, failing however to become a Hanguk Kiwon professional. Shikshin went on to win multiple major European titles including the Russian Go Championship, European Team Championship, European Pro Championship and European Pair Go Championship in which he competed with his sister Svetlana.

In 2015, Shikshin became the fourth player to be awarded the European Go Federation professional status after taking second place in the 2015 Pro Qualification Tournament. He was promoted to 2-dan in 2018, 3-dan in 2019, and 4-dan in 2021.

== Personal life ==
In 2010, Shiskhin unsuccessfully participated in the Kazan City Duma elections, representing the Communist Party of the Russian Federation. Shikshin resides in Moscow with his wife and daughter, combining his professional career with his role as Moscow Go Federation vice-president.

== Titles and Runner-up Placements ==
Titles
Title	Wins	Runners-up
European Championship	7 (2007, 2010, 2011, 2016, 2017, 2019, 2020)	1 (2012)
European Team Championship	5 (2007, 2011, 2014, 2017, 2018)	3 (2013, 2016, 2019)
European Pair Go Championship	4 (2013–2016)	
Russian Go Championship	9 (2005–2007, 2009, 2012, 2014–2017)	2 (2010, 2013)
European Pro Championship	2 (2017, 2019)	2 (2016, 2018)
Career total
Total	27	8
