= Antti Törmänen (Go player) =

Finnish Go player

Personal information
- Native name: アンティ トルマネン (Japanese)
- Born: 28 June 1989 (age 37) Oulu, Finland

Sport
- Turned pro: 2016
- Teacher: Kobayashi Chizu
- Rank: 1 dan
- Affiliation: Nihon Ki-in

Antti Törmänen (born 28 June 1989) is a professional Go player from Oulu, Finland. He currently lives in Tokyo, Japan.

== Biography ==
Törmänen has stated that he became interested in Go aged 12, after reading the manga Hikaru no Go. He became an insei at the Nihon Kiin in the autumn of 2011.

== Achievements ==
As an amateur player, Törmänen had played in several tournaments with some noteworthy results.

- Fifth place in the World Youth Go Championship 2005.
- Winning the Finnish championships in 2008, 2010 and 2012.
- Winning the London Open Go Congress 2010.
- Winning the rapid tournament of the European Go Championship 2011.
- Second place in the European Open Go Championship 2013.

=== Professional status ===
In December 2015, it was reported that Törmänen had qualified as a professional player in Japan. He won half of his games in the Nihon Ki-in pro exam in the autumn, which was deemed enough to qualify. He made his debut as a professional in April 1, 2016.
