= Diána Kőszegi =

Hungarian Go player (born 1983)

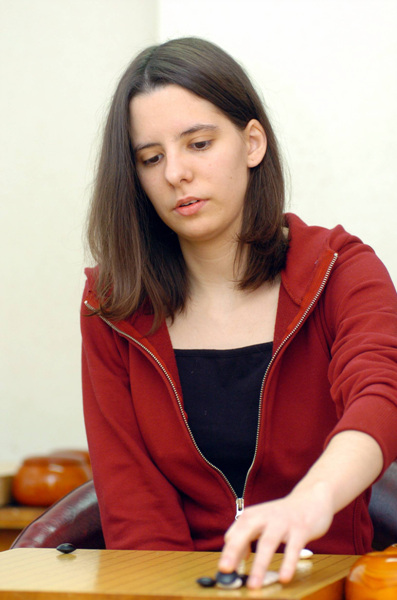
- Kőszegi in 2008

Personal information
- Born: 14 August 1983 (age 42) Budapest, Hungary

Sport
- Turned pro: 2008
- Rank: 2 pro dan
- Affiliation: Hanguk Kiwon

Diána Kőszegi (born August 14, 1983) is a Hungarian professional Go player. She became the sixth European professional player when she was promoted by the Korean Go Association on January 4, 2008 and is the first Hungarian professional player.

== Biography ==
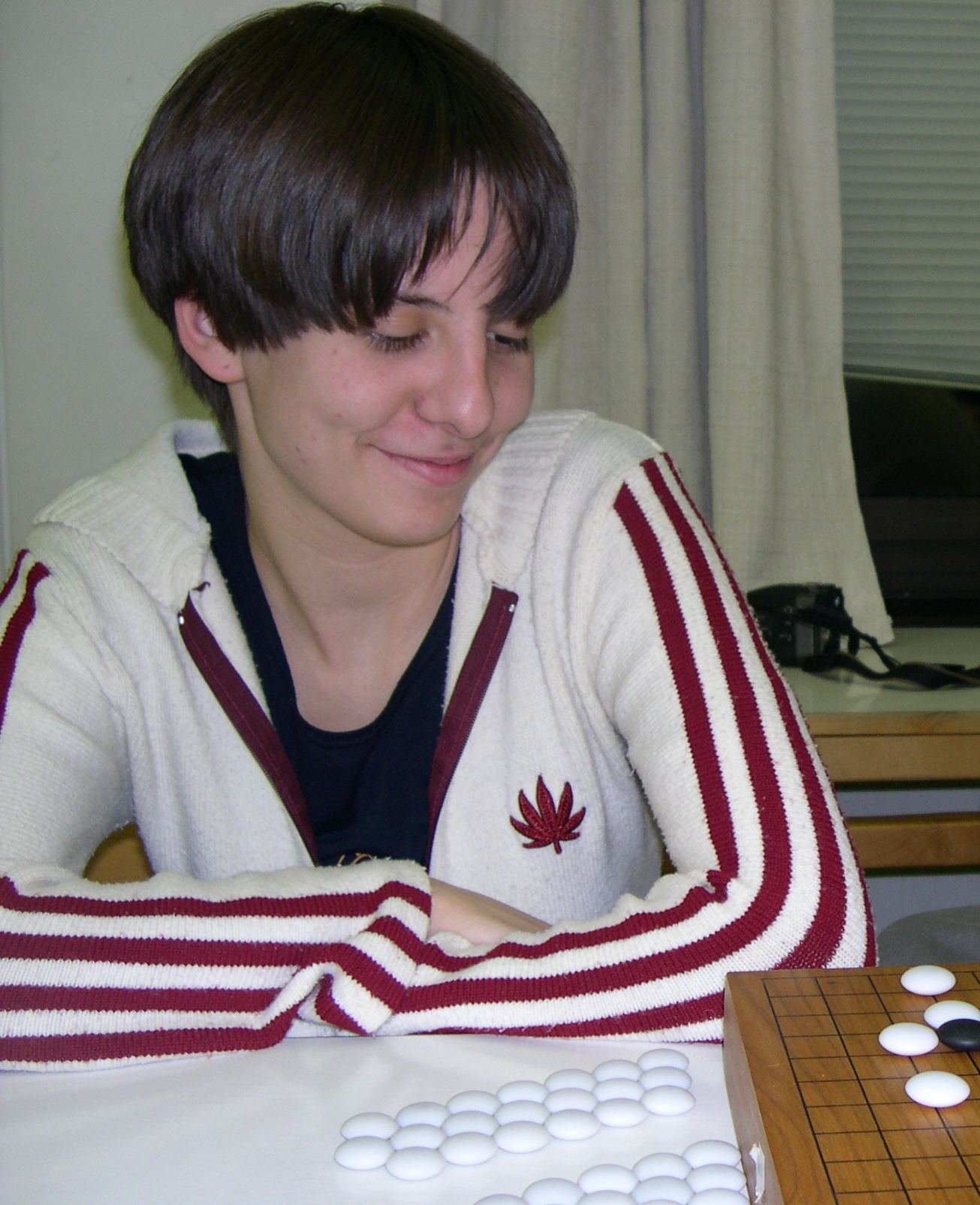
Kőszegi Diána at the 2004 Hungarian Rengo Championship

Diána Kőszegi was born in August 1983 in Budapest. She began playing Go at the age of nine while learning from her father, Sándor Kőszegi, who also taught Go to primary school students. At the age of 11, she began studying under Tibor Pocsai, the winner of the European Go Championship in 1988, while also teaching Go on the KGS Go Server.

In 1996, she met 9 dan professional Yasutoshi Yasuda, with whom she kept in contact and Shigeno Yuki, a friend whom Kőszegi considers as close as a sister. Although Kőszegi could not study under Yasuda, both Yasuda and Yuki were significant influences for her.

When Kőszegi was 14, she placed 4th at the 1st World Women Amateur Baduk Championship, held in 1997 in Seoul. In the following autumn, she finished 2nd in the 2nd European Women Amateur Go Championship. In 1998, she placed 9th at the female equivalent of the World Amateur Go Championship and was invited to Japan and South Korea to study as an insei. However, her family prohibited her travel due to her young age.

In March 2000, Kőszegi won the European Youth Go Championship that was held in Sinaia. She had earned 2nd place in the two years preceding her victory, and finished with the same position in 2001. In the same year, despite finishing only joint 8th at the Hungarian Go Championship, winning the play-offs between the top 6, she became the Hungarian Go Champion. She was the first Hungarian invited to professional competitions in China, while still an amateur. Representing Europe, she entered three competitions in 2000 (Shanghai), 2001 (Guiyang), and 2002 (Hong Kong).

Since 2001, she has continued studying Go without a tutor.

In 2001, she stayed in Japan for 1.5 months, thanks to her sister and brother Kobayashi Chizu and Kobayashi Satoru. In 2003, she studied at the Hungarian university ELTE in the programming mathematician department, but was unable to complete her course due to an invitation from the KimWon Baduk Academy sent by Eo Jong Soo (7 dan Korean), who Kőszegi met at the World Championship held in Korea in 2003.

She stayed in Korea for three months during 2004, but returned once her visa could not be extended. Until Kőszegi was promoted to professional from 2005 as an insei, she competed at the league in Seoul. In 2005, she studied at the Korean Myongji University and started teaching Go online.

She translated the Go book 21st Century New Openings by Kim Sung Rae (4 Dan) into English.

== Promotion record ==
Rank	Year	Notes
1 dan	2008	Promoted to professional dan rank by the Korean Go Association
2 dan	2025	Promoted by the Korean Go Association
3 dan		
4 dan		
5 dan		
6 dan		
7 dan		
8 dan		
9 dan		

== See also ==
- List of Go organizations
