= Hans Pietsch =

Hans Pietsch may refer to:

- Hans Pietsch (Go player)
- Hans Pietsch (mathematician)
