= Manfred Wimmer =

Austrian professional Go player (1944–1995)

Personal information
- Born: c. 1944 Austria
- Died: May 23, 1995 (aged 50–51) Vienna, Austria

Sport
- Rank: 2 dan professional
- Affiliation: Kansai Ki-In

Manfred Wimmer (c. 1944 – 1995) was the first Western professional Go player.

Manfred Wimmer was born in Austria in 1944. He won the European Go Championship in 1969 and 1974. He became a professional shodan in the Kansai Ki-In on January 26, 1978 (shortly before James Kerwin, the American who became the second Western Go professional on February 14, 1978, in the Nihon Kiin). Wimmer was promoted to the rank of 2p the same year (though gobase.org lists him as a 1p).

In 1991, he introduced the game of Go in Madagascar and, around the same time, reportedly in Kenya. Wimmer died of a stroke in Vienna in 1995 while playing Go at a cafe.

== See also ==
- European Go Players
- European Go Federation
