= Artem Kachanovskyi =

Ukrainian Go player (born 1992)

Artem Kachanovskyi 2p
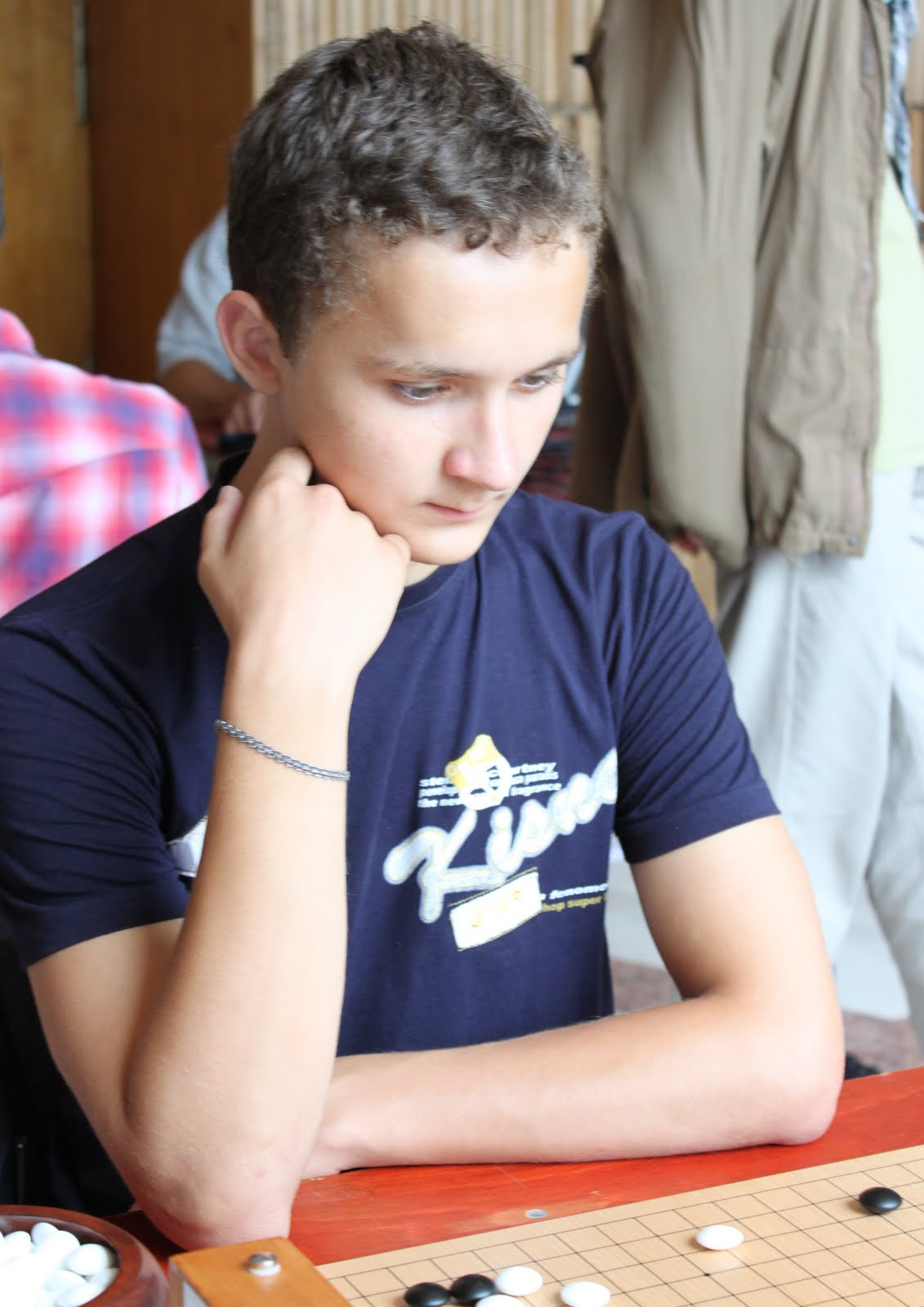

Personal information
- Nickname: artem92 (OGS)
- Born: December 12, 1992 (age 33)

Sport
- Turned pro: 2016
- Rank: 2-dan pro
- Affiliation: European Go Federation

Artem Volodymyrovych Kachanovskyi (ukr. Арте́м Володи́мирович Качано́вський, born 12.12.1992) is a 2-dan professional go player from Ukraine. He was the fifth player to be awarded professional status by the European Go Federation, in 2016. He has won the European Grand Slam tournament twice, in 2017 and 2021, and was runner-up in the European Championship four times, in 2010, 2019, 2021 and 2022. He placed third in the 2013 World Amateur Go Championship, an achievement shared by only two other European players. Among other high tournament placements, he was part of the winning team in the Pandanet European Team Championship in 2016 and 2022, and won the Silk Road Tournament in 2019 and the first season of the European Professional Go League in 2020.

== Biography ==
Kachanovskyi was born on 12 December 1992 and grew up in Rivne, Ukraine. He began playing go at the age of 7 after his father read about the game in a newspaper and began to teach him and his brother, Mykhailo. He attended a local go club until he surpassed his teacher in strength, after reaching the level of 3-kyu. From then on, he continued his studies of the game alone. After completing studies of Computer Science, he decided after the introduction of a professional system in Europe in 2014 to devote himself entirely to the game and attempt to make a living from it.

Among the strongest players in Europe, Kachanovskyi is notable for never having visited Asia for an extended period to study, instead achieving his strength mostly through self-study. In 2016, Kachanovskyi became the fifth player to be awarded professional status by the EGF, after emerging the overall victor of a six-round, single knockout tournament of sixteen of Europe's strongest players and beating his fellow Ukrainian Andrii Kravets in the final. Kravets and Kachanovskyi both studied as children at the same go school in Rivne, and Kravets would go on to achieve professional status himself the following year.

== Personal life ==
Now living in Kyiv with his wife and two children, Kachanovskyi launched the "European Go Journal" in February 2021. The Journal is published monthly to an international readership of around 300 people, and features varied content including European and international news, game commentaries, interviews, photography, artwork, tsumego problems and more. Assisted by two proofreaders and content contributors from around Europe, Kachanovskyi celebrated the one-year anniversary of the project in February 2022 with a special article on the project's origins and developments.

== Tournament and promotional history ==
Career Details of Artem Kachanovskyi 2p
Year	Major Tournament Achievements	Notes
2010	European Championship – 2nd place	
2011	European Championship – 3rd place, Pandanet European Team Championship – 3rd place	
2012	European Team Championship – 3rd place	
2013	European Team Championship – 3rd place, World Amateur Go Championship – 3rd place	Kachanovskyi is one of only two European players ever to place in the top three of the WAGC
2015	Pandanet European Team Championship – 2nd place	
2016	European Grand Slam – 2nd place, Pandanet European Team Championship – 1st place	Promoted to 1-dan professional
2017	European Grand Slam – 1st place, European Championship – 3rd place	In the Grand Slam final, Kachanovskyi beat Russian professional Alexander Dinerchstein 3p to win the grand prize of €10,000
2018	European Grand Prix Final – 2nd place, European Professional Championship – 3rd place, Pandanet European Team Championship – 3rd place	Promoted to 2-dan professional
2019	European Grand Prix Final – 3rd place, European Professional Championship – 1st place, European Grand Slam – 2nd place, Pandanet Go European Team Championship – 3rd place, European Championship – 2nd place, Silk Road Tournament – 1st place	
2020	European Grand Prix Final – 2nd place, European Championship – 3rd place, European Professional League Season 1 – 1st place	First iteration of the Professional League, beating Pavol Lisý 2p 3–0 in the final
2021	2020 European Grand Prix Final – 2nd place, Pandanet Go European Team Championship – 3rd place, European Championship – 2nd place, European Grand Slam – 1st place, Transatlantic Professional League – 3rd place	First iteration of the Transatlantic Professional League, beating Tanguy le Calvé 1p 2–1 in the small final
2022	Pandanet Go European Team Championship – 1st place, European Championship – 2nd place	
2023	Pandanet Go European Team Championship – 1st Place	
