= Svetlana Shikshina =

Russian Go player (born 1980)

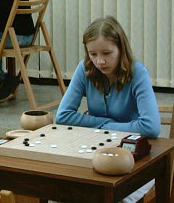

Personal information
- Full name: Svetlana Valeryevna Shikshina
- Born: March 7, 1980 (age 46) Kazan, Russian SFSR, Soviet Union

Sport
- Turned pro: 2002
- Teacher: Valery Shikshin Chun Poong Jho 9 dan
- Rank: 3 dan
- Affiliation: Hanguk Kiwon

Svetlana Valeryevna Shikshina (Светлана Валерьевна Шикшина, born March 7, 1980) is a professional Go player from Russia, one of only four western women to date to reach professional status. She achieved this in 2002, affiliated to the Hanguk Kiwon (the Korean Baduk Association).

== Biography ==
Svetlana Shikshina started playing go at the age of 10. She was trained by her father Valery Shikshin, who also tutored some of the best Russian players – Alexandre Dinerchtein, Andrei Kulkov and Ilya Shikshin (who is Svetlana's brother and a 3-dan professional.) She was Russian Female Champion from 1994 till 1996; in 1996 she won the European Female Championship. In 2006 she won the overall European championship (her compatriot Alexandre Dinerchtein placed second).

In 1997, Svetlana moved to South Korea to study go professionally. In 2002 she was promoted to professional status and received 1-dan professional status. In 2008 she was promoted to 3-dan professional level. In 2005, she started an annual Children's Go Tournament, the Svetlana Shikshina Cup.

== Achievements ==
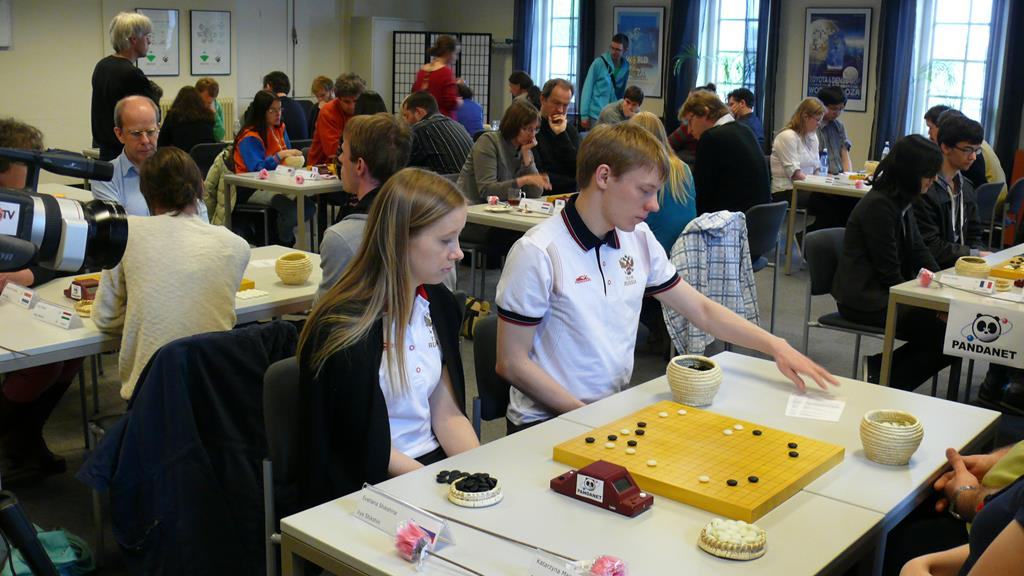
European pair Go, 2013

- One of the very few non-Asian players to reach professional playing strength.
- European Female Champion in 1996 and 2005.
- European Champion in 2006.
- 1997 — 3rd place at the World female Championship.
- 2001, 2011 — 1st place at the European Team Championship.
- 2004 — winner of the European Ing Cup and a representative from Europe at the 17th Fujitsu Cup.
- 2006 — 1st place at the European Masters Tournament.
- 2007— European representative at the 21st Fujitsu Cup.
- 2012–2016 — 1st place at the European Pair Go Championship
