= Franz-Josef Dickhut =

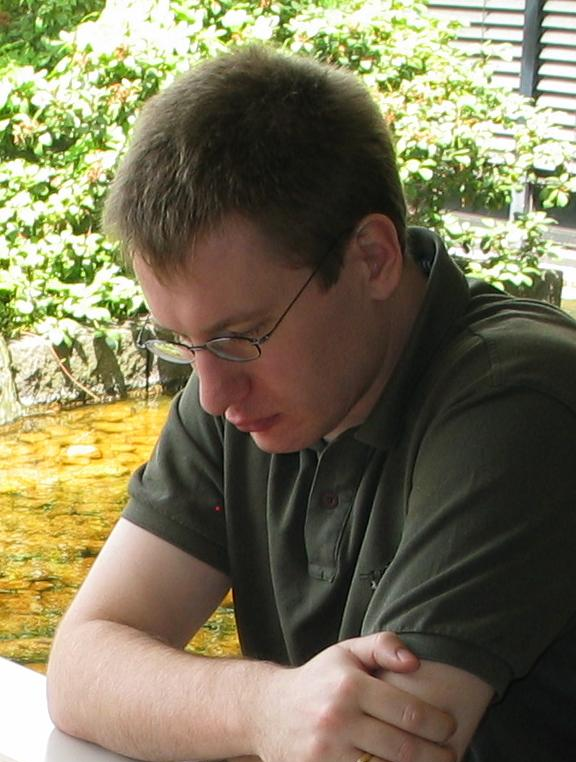
- Portrait of Franz-Josef Dickhut

Sport
- Rank: 6 dan

Franz-Josef Dickhut is a German amateur Go player.

== Biography ==
Franz-Josef Dickhut has won the German Go championship eleven times. He was European vice champion (in 1998) and European blitz go champion (in 1998). His best result at the World Amateur Championship was its fifth rank in 2005. He also participated twice as European representative at the LG-Cup (2005) and Fujitsu Cup (2009).
