= Jan Hora =

Czech water polo player

Personal information
- Nationality: Czech
- Born: 25 November 1900 Prague, Bohemia, Austria-Hungary
- Died: 12 December 1953 (aged 53) Prague, Czechoslovakia

Sport
- Sport: Water polo

Jan Hora (25 November 1900 – 12 December 1953) was a Czech police chief and water polo player. He competed at the 1920 Summer Olympics and the 1924 Summer Olympics.

He has been a police commissioner since graduating from college. In the 1930s, he was mentioned in the press on the occasion of investigations into various cases. In 1938, he was promoted to the position of police councillor. After the Second World War he held the post of chief councillor in the Home Office. In 1948, he was the chief investigator into the mysterious death of Jan Masaryk.
