= Jürgen Dueball =

German chess player (1943–2002)

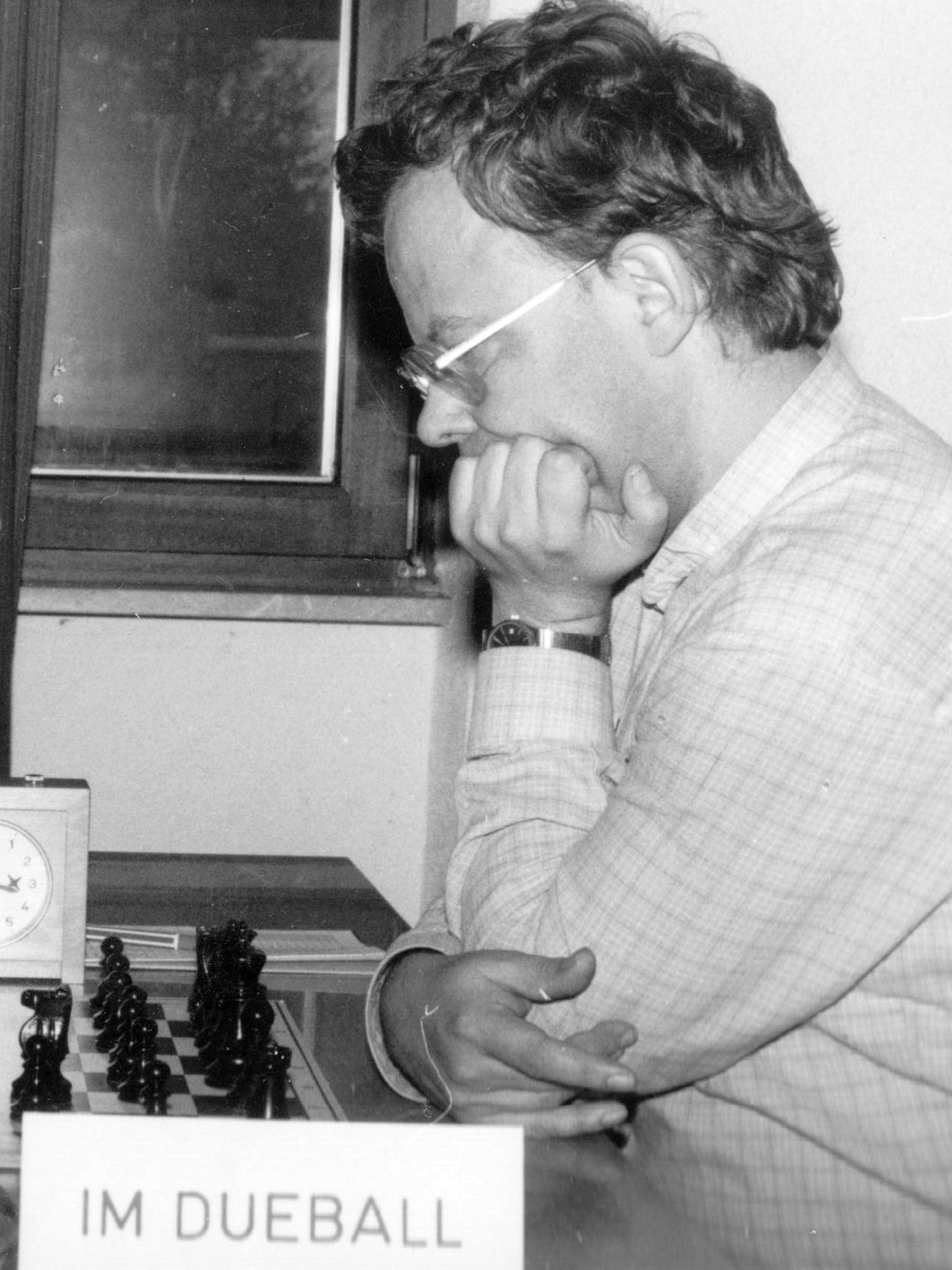

Personal information
- Born: 17 April 1943 Berlin, Germany
- Died: 15 October 2002 (aged 59) Solingen, Germany

Chess career
- Country: Germany
- Title: International Master (1973)
- Peak rating: 2460 (January 1976)

Jürgen Dueball (17 April 1943 — 15 October 2002) was a German chess International Master (IM) (1973) and Chess Olympiad individual bronze medal winner (1972).

== Biography ==
In 1966, Jürgen Dueball won German chess tournament Dähne-Pokal. In 1967, he won West Berlin City Chess Championship. In 1974, in Reggio Emilia international chess tournament he shared 1st place with Gyula Sax. In 1990, Jürgen Dueball won European Chess Club Cup with German chess club SG Solingen. In 1973, he was awarded the FIDE International Master (IM) title.

Jürgen Dueball played for West Germany in the Chess Olympiads:

- In 1972, at second reserve board in the 20th Chess Olympiad in Skopje (+6, =6, -1) and won individual bronze medal,
- In 1974, at first reserve board in the 21st Chess Olympiad in Nice (+8, =5, -3).

Jürgen Dueball played for West Germany in the European Team Chess Championship:

- In 1973, at fifth board in the 5th European Team Chess Championship in Bath (+1, =3, -3).

Jürgen Dueball played for West Germany in the World Student Team Chess Championships:

- In 1968, at fourth board in the 15th World Student Team Chess Championship in Ybbs (+4, =5, -1) and won team silver medal,
- In 1969, at third board in the 16th World Student Team Chess Championship in Dresden (+6, =4, -1).

Jürgen Dueball played for West Germany in the Nordic Chess Cups:

- In 1970, at third board in the 1st Nordic Chess Cup in Großenbrode (+1, =2, -0) and won team and individual gold medal,
- In 1971, at second board in the 2nd Nordic Chess Cup in Großenbrode (+1, =4, -0),
- In 1972, at second board in the 3rd Nordic Chess Cup in Großenbrode (+1, =2, -1) and won team bronze medal,
- In 1973, at first board in the 4th Nordic Chess Cup in Ribe (+3, =1, -1) and won individual gold medal,
- In 1974, at fourth board in the 5th Nordic Chess Cup in Eckernförde (+3, =2, -0) and won team and individual gold medal,
- In 1977, at first board in the 8th Nordic Chess Cup in Glücksburg (+1, =2, -2) and won team silver medal.

Jürgen Dueball studied mathematics and physics in Free University of Berlin, also interested in astronomy. He worked as a programmer at the Solingen City Administration.
