= Jan Šimara =

Czech Go player (born 1985)

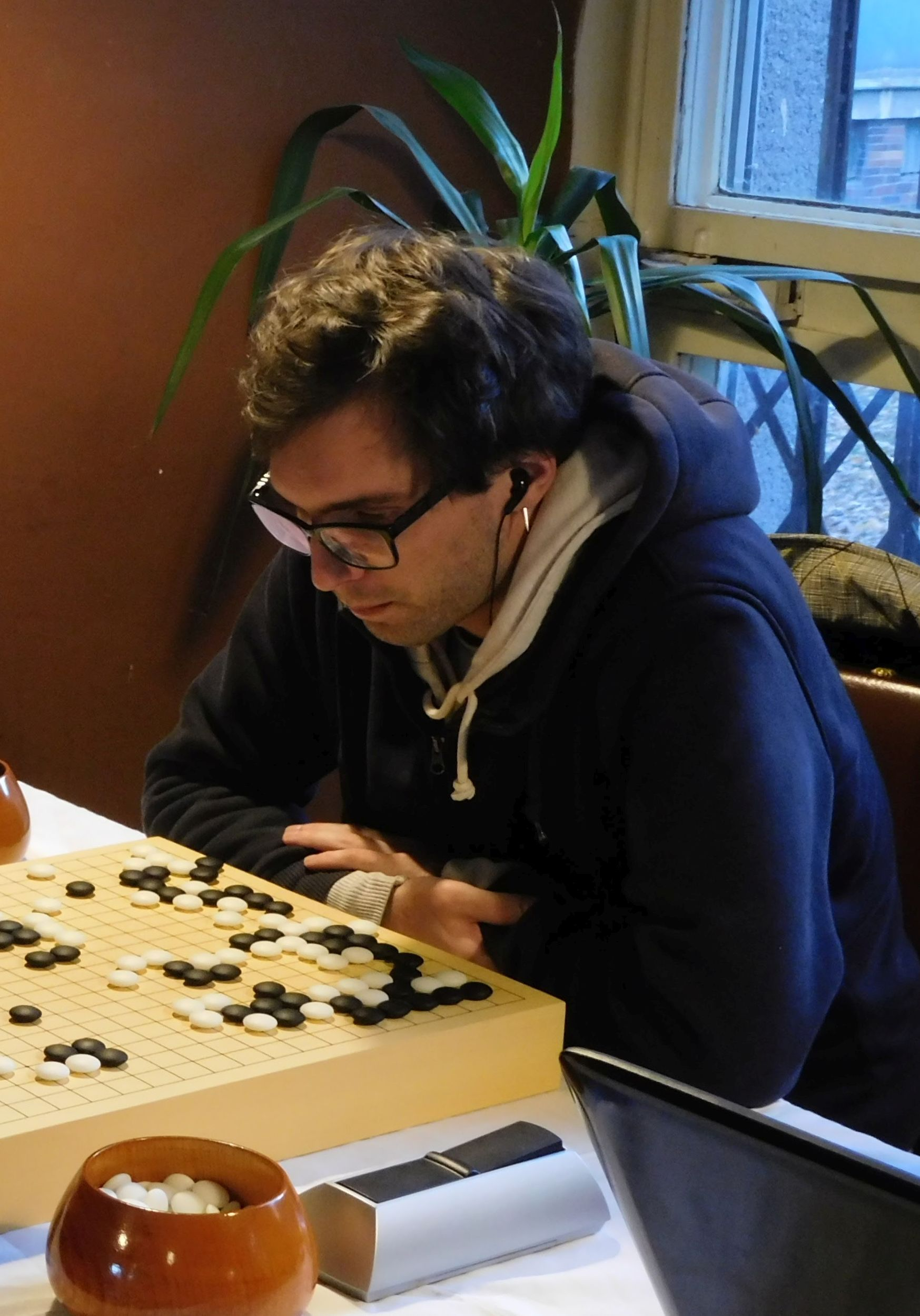

Personal information
- Nickname: flashback (KGS)
- Born: December 1985 (age 40)

Sport
- Rank: 1p
- Rating: 2638

Jan Šimara (* December 1985 Zlín) is a Czech Go player. He placed first in the European Go Championship in 2012.

== Curriculum vitae ==
He first participated in the tournament at the age of 14 in 1998 in Olomouc, when he began his go career with a 5-0 win. After playing two more tournaments, he stopped playing go due to his interest in chess because his chess coach convinced him to focus only on chess. He returned to the game of go after four years in 2002 in Olomouc and again won all five games. According to the comparison of go players performance in the Czech Republic, J. Šimara maintained the same performance trend as several other top players in the Czech Republic. In the following years, he began to focus primarily on go. He advanced from 14 kyu to 5 kyu in one year. He reached the first dan class after three years in 2005. Until 2011, he devoted himself to the game of go while studying at UTB in Zlín, which he successfully completed by defending his diploma in the form of an interactive textbook of informatics. After graduating, he continued his sports career in the board game go. After winning the European Go Champion title in 2012, he began playing poker, which he made for living for the next few years. In the same year -2012- he reached a 6 dan. At the turn of 2014/2015, he completed a one-year internship in Beijing aimed at improving game performance. At present (2020) he ranks among the top Czech Go players. He is known as flashback on the KGS go server. Jan won the eighth European Pro Qualification tournament in 2023 and became the first Czech and ninth player to be certified as a 1-dan professional by the EGF.

== Game achievements ==
- 1st place at the European Pro Qualification tournament in 2023, Mokrá-Horákov, (Czech Republic)
- 2nd place at the European Team Championship in 2014, Romania (Sibiu)
- 1st place at the European Team Championship in 2013, Poland, Olsztyn
- 2nd place at the European Team Championships in 2012, Germany, Bonn
- 1st place in the European Championship in 2012, Germany, Bonn
- 6th place in the SportAccord World Mind Spord Games in 2011, China, Beijing
- 7th place Student World Championships in 2011, Japan, Tokyo
- 5th place in the team tournament at the World Mind Sports Games in 2008
