= European Go Federation =

European non-profit organization

- Formation: 1957
- Type: Sports federation, International Go Federation
- Headquarters: Amstelveen, Netherlands
- Members: Armenia, Austria, Belarus, Belgium, Bosnia, Bulgaria, Croatia, Cyprus, Czech Republic, Denmark, Finland, France, Germany, Georgia, Hungary, Iceland, Ireland, Israel, Italy, Kazakhstan, Lithuania, Luxembourg, Netherlands, Norway, Poland, Portugal, Romania, Russia, Serbia, Slovakia, Slovenia, Spain, Sweden, Switzerland, Turkey, Ukraine, United Kingdom
- Official language: English
- President: Manja Marz
- Website: www.eurogofed.org

The European Go Federation (EGF) is a non-profit organization with the purpose of encouraging, regulating, co-ordinating, and disseminating the playing of the board game Go in Europe. The EGF was founded in 1957, the same year that the inaugural European Go Congress (EGC) took place in Cuxhaven, Germany. The Congress has been an annual event every year since then, held each time in a different European city. The European Go Championship takes place during the EGC, as well as the Annual General Meeting (AGM). In 2014, the European Professional System was established by the European Go Federation.

Membership is open to any Go-organising association in a country in or near Europe. There are currently 35 full members, and two suspended members.

== Function ==
The EGF elects an Executive Committee which supervises a number of commissions in charge of normal activities in between the AGMs.

Major European tournaments do not fall under the Executive Committee's supervision, but are directly co-ordinated by the EGF itself. Major events organised by the EGF include the European Grand Prix; the Pandanet European Team Championship; European Youth Go Championships in three age categories; the European Youth Team Championship; the European Pair Go Championship, the European Women's Championship; the European Student Championship and the European Championship, held during the annual European Go Congress. An official Rating List is maintained by processing the results of as many European tournaments as possible.

The European Go Federation is a member of the International Go Federation.

== Members ==
Country	Member name
Armenia	Armenian Draughts and Go Federation
Austria	Austrian Go Federation (Go Verband Österreich)
Belarus (membership suspended)	Belarus Go Federation
Belgium	Belgian Go Federation (Belgische Go Federatie - Fédération Belge de Go)
(Bosnia and Herzegovina) Bosnia	Go Association of Bosnia and Herzegovina (Go Asocijacija Bosne i Hecegovine)
Bulgaria	Bulgarian Go Association (Bulgarska Go Asotsiatsija)
Croatia	Croatian Go Alliance (Hrvatski Go Savez)
Cyprus	Cyprus Go Association (Kypriakos Syndesmos Go)
Czech Republic	Czech Go Association (Ceska Asociace Go)
Denmark	Danish Go Association (Dansk Go Forbund)
Finland	Finnish Go Association (Suomen Go-liitto ry)
France	French Go Federation (Fédération Française de Go)
(Georgia (country)) Georgia	Georgian Go Federation (საქართველოს გო-ს ეროვნული სპორტული ფედერაცია)
Germany	German Go Federation (Deutscher Go-Bund)
Hungary	Hungarian Go Association (Magyar Gószövetség)
Iceland	Icelandic Go Association (Hið Íslenska Gofélag)
(Republic of Ireland) Ireland	Irish Go Association (Cumann Go na hÉireann)
Israel	Israeli Go Association (Agudat Ha-Go Ha-Yisraelit)
Italy	Italian Go Federation (Federazione Italiana Giuoco Go)
Kazakhstan	Kazakhstan Go Federation (Kazakhstan Go Federation)
Lithuania	Lithuanian Go Association (Lietuvos Go Asociacija)
Luxembourg	Go Club Luxemburg (Le Club de Go du Luxembourg)
Netherlands	Dutch Go Association (Nederlandse Go Bond)
Norway	Norwegian Go Association (Go i Norge)
Poland	Polish Go Association (Polskie Stowarzyszenie Go)
Portugal	Portuguese Go Association (Associação Portuguesa de Go)
Romania	Romanian Go Federation (Federatia Romana de Go)
Russia (membership suspended)	Russian Go Federation (Rossiiskaya Federatziaya Go)
Serbia	Serbian Go Federation (Go Savez Srbije)
Slovakia	Slovak Go Association (Slovenská Asociácia Go)
Slovenia	Slovenian Go Association (Go Zveza Slovenije)
Spain	Spanish Go Association (Asociacion Española de Go)
Sweden	Swedish Go Association (Svenska Goförbundet)
Switzerland	Swiss Go Association (Schweizer Go Verband - Fédération Suisse de Go - Federazione Svizzera di Go)
Turkey	Turkish Go Players' Association (Türkiye Go Oyunculari Dernegi)
Ukraine	Ukrainian Go Federation (Ukrainska' Federatsiya Go)
United Kingdom	British Go Association (British Go Association)

Note: On 3 March 2022, the EGF decided during an emergency general meeting to suspend indefinitely both the Russian and Belarusian associations due to the 2022 Invasion of Ukraine by Russia. All planned or future events organised by the EGF were cancelled and players from both countries were banned from representing their nations at European events. The first major event affected was the 2022 European Youth Go Championship held between the 10 and 12 March in Czechia.

== EGF Professional players ==
The EGF established a professional system in 2014 with Chinese sponsorship. Top European players are invited to take part in a Qualification Tournament, with one or two of the most successful competitors being awarded professional status. Professionals can then be promoted by earning points from wins against other professional players in major tournaments. As of 2023, there are nine such players, who enjoy benefits including automatic qualification to the Grand Slam and the opportunity to represent Europe in major international tournaments.

Professional Players of the EGF
Player	Nationality	Year Became Pro	Promotion History
Ilya Shikshin	Russian	2015	Promoted to 2p in 2018, to 3p in 2019, to 4p in 2021.
Artem Kachanovskyi	Ukrainian	2016	Promoted to 2p in 2018, to 3p in 2024.
Pavol Lisý	Slovak	2014	Promoted to 2p in 2018.
Mateusz Surma	Polish	2015	Promoted to 2p in 2019, to 3p in 2023.
Ali Jabarin	Israeli	2014	Promoted to 2p in 2018.
Andrii Kravets	Ukrainian	2017	
Tanguy le Calvé	French	2019	
Stanisław Frejlak	Polish	2021	
Jan Šimara	Czech	2023	

== Current title holders ==
Below is a summary of the current holders or most recent winners of the major EGF-organised events.

Title	Title Holder	Notes
European Championship	Andrii Kravets 1p	Held August 2024 in Toulouse, France. Kravets successfully defended his title from 2023.
European Women's Championship	Li Ting 1p	Held September 2024 in Bratislava, Slovakia.
European Grand Prix Finale	Cornel Burzo 6d	Held December 2023 in London, UK.
European Grand Slam	Mateusz Surma 3p	Held October 2023 in Prague, Czechia.
Pandanet European Team Championship	France	Finals held August 2024 in Toulouse, France.
European Pair Go Championship	Milena Boclé 3d and Florent Labouret 5d	Held April 2024 in Dubrovnik, Croatia.
European Student Championship	Martin Ruzicka 4d	Held September 2022 in Trier, Germany.
European Youth Championship – U20 Category	Benoit Robichon	Held March 2024 in Hamburg, Germany.
European Youth Championship – U16 Category	Yuze Xing 5d	Held March 2024 in Hamburg, Germany.
European Youth Championship – U12 Category	Bartik Dach 2d	Held March 2024 in Hamburg, Germany.
European Youth Team Championship	Ukraine	

== See also ==
- Nihon Ki-in (Japanese Go Association)
- Hanguk Kiwon (Korean Go Association)
- Zhongguo Qiyuan (Chinese Go Association)
- Taiwan Chi-Yuan (Taiwanese Go Association)
- American Go Association
- List of Go organizations
- Transatlantic Professional Go Team Championship
