= Hans Pietsch (Go player) =

German Go player

Personal information
- Native name: ハンス・ピーチ (Japanese)
- Full name: Hans Reinhard Pietsch
- Born: September 27, 1968 Bremen, Germany
- Died: January 16, 2003 (aged 34) Amatitlán, Guatemala

Sport
- Teacher: Satoru Kobayashi, Chizu Kobayashi
- Rank: 6 dan (posthumously)

Hans Reinhard Pietsch (September 27, 1968 ~ January 16, 2003) was a German Go player, one of the few European-born to have been promoted to the professional levels.

He was born in 1968, in Bremen, Germany. He began playing Go at the age of 12. In 1990 he became the first German insei at the Nihon Ki-in and was promoted to professional 1-dan in 1997. He was then promoted to 4-dan in 2000. On January 16, 2003, during a tour in Guatemala to promote Go he was confronted by armed robbers and was shot. He later died from his wound at a local hospital. The Nihon Ki-in posthumously promoted him to the rank of 6-dan.
