= Alexandre Dinerchtein =

Russian Go player (born 1980)

Personal information
- Born: April 19, 1980 (age 46) Kazan, Russian SFSR, Soviet Union

Sport
- Teacher: Cheon Poong-Jo
- Rank: 3-dan pro
- Affiliation: Hanguk Kiwon

Alexandre (also Alexander) Grigorievich Dinerchtein (Александр Григорьевич Динерштейн; born April 19, 1980) is a professional Go player from Russia. He is one of only a few non-Asian players to reach professional status, which he achieved in 2002 at the Hanguk Kiwon (Korean Professional Go Association). He has won the European Championship seven times between 1999 and 2009.

== Biography ==
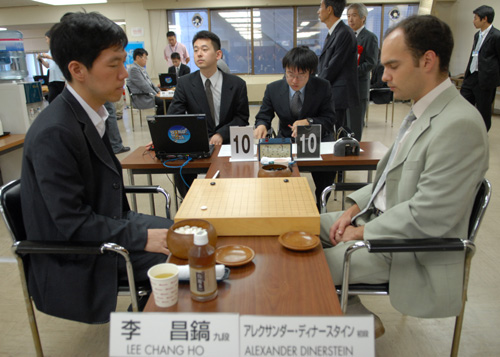
Dinerchtein (right) playing against Lee Chang-ho.

=== Early life ===
Dinerchtein started playing go in 1986, when he was just 6 years old. He was born and raised in Kazan, Russia, where he grew up around strong Russian Go players, such as Ivan Detkov and Valeryi Solovyev. He first learned Go from his father. He was both a chess and Go player, but by the age of 10 he stopped playing chess and went deeper into Go with his new teacher Valery Shikshin.

=== Move to Korea ===
In 1996, ten years after he started learning Go, he was invited by Cheon Poong-jo of the Hanguk Kiwon to study Go in Seoul. Dinerchtein moved to Korea in 1997 and started to live in one of the biggest Go schools. He studied Go with several young Korean players that have since risen to fame, including Pak Yeong-hun —whom he beat once in 1998—, Park Chi-eun, Lee Chang-ung and Ko Geuntae.

=== Becoming professional ===
In 2002 Alexandre made history by becoming the first Russian Go player to be promoted to professional status, alongside Svetlana Shikshina. Both players were promoted by special recommendation, a feat achieved by very few non-Asian players. He has since started a career in teaching Go to western players.

== List of Achievements ==
- One of the very few non-Asian players to reach professional playing strength.
- Seven-time European Champion (1999, 2000, 2002, 2003, 2004, 2005, 2009)
- Winner of several top European events, including the European Ing Cup (2001, 2002), European Go Oza (2002, 2006, 2008) and European Masters (2005, 2007).
- Dinerchtein defeated O Rissei, 9dan professional and one of Japan's strongest players.
