= Pavol Lisý =

Slovak go player (born 1995)

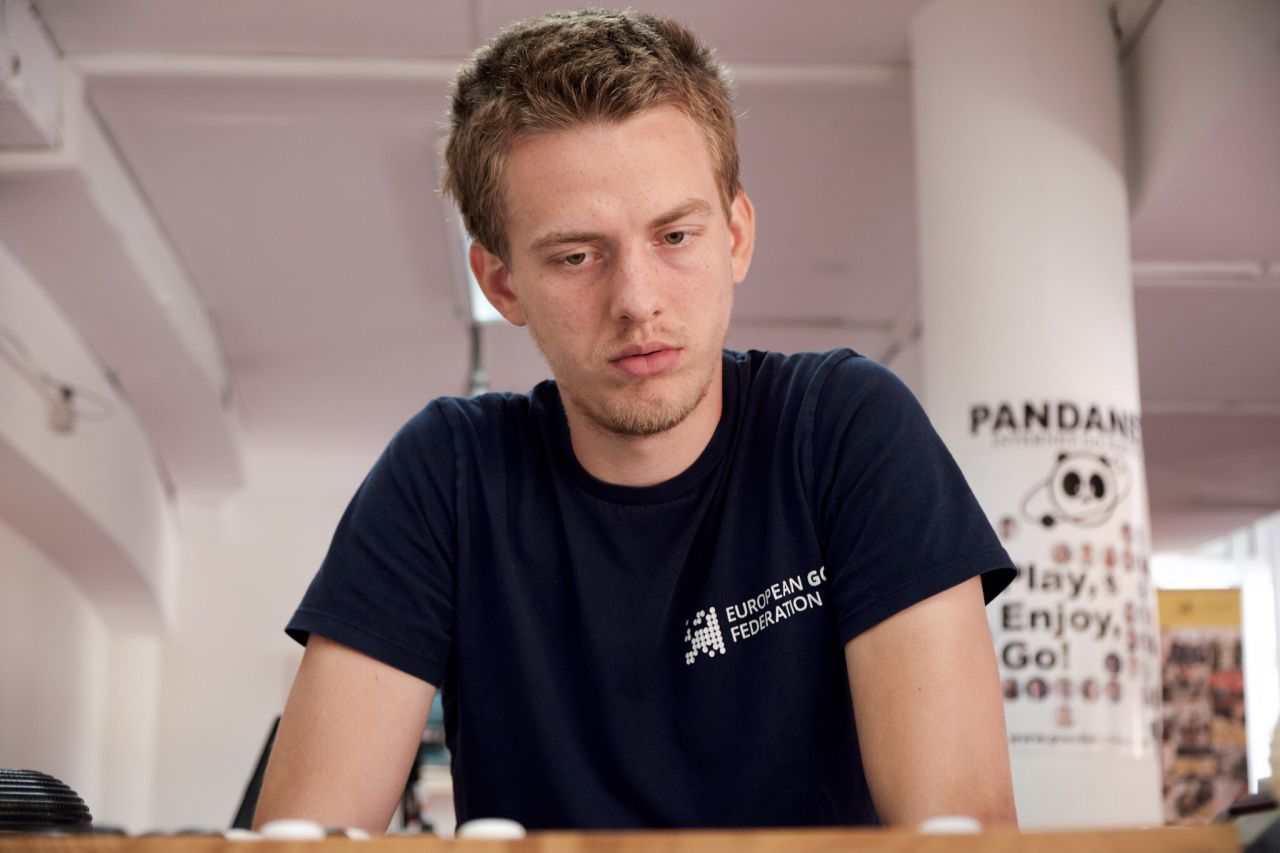

Personal information
- Nickname: cheater (KGS)
- Born: 9 February 1995 (age 31) Dunajská Streda, Slovakia

Sport
- Turned pro: 2014
- Rank: 2-dan pro
- Affiliation: European Go Federation
- Rating: 2638

Pavol Lisý (born 9 February 1995) is a Slovak go player. He was the first professional go player certified by the European Go Federation.

== Life ==
Lisý was born on 9 February 1995 in Dunajská Streda. After graduating from the Grösslingová high school, Lisý studied at the Faculty of Mathematics, Physics and Informatics at Comenius University in Bratislava. There he successfully defended first a bachelor's thesis on the topic "Cryptocurrency" and then a diploma thesis on the topic "The use of statistical modelling to predict the behaviour of mobile game players. In addition to go, he currently works as a programmer in the field of data processing.

== Go career ==
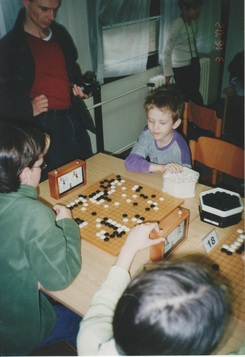
Lisý at the age of 7

Lisý started playing go at the age of 5. At the age of 6, he finished his first tournament at the 2001 European Children's Championship with six wins out of six games. He studied go at home and later was taught by Miroslav Poilak 3d once a week. In 2009, he received a scholarship provided to 10 promising young players from 10 countries to study go for 3 months at the King's Baduk School in the mountains near Beijing. He subsequently studied in Korea under the supervision of professional players Kim Sung-Rae 8p, Kim Seong-Ryong 9p and Hong Seul-Ki 7d. Lisý was promoted to amateur 6-dan in 2012, one year later he was promoted to 7-dan amateur.

In 2014, Lisý became the first professional player certified by the European Go Federation after taking first place in the Pro Qualification Tournament in 2014. He was promoted to a 2-dan professional in 2018.

== Game achievements ==
- 2nd place European Grand Prix final (2019)
- Master of Europe (2018)
- Master of European Professionals (2018)
- 2nd Grand Slam (2018)
- The first European professional go player (2014)
- Seven-time master of Slovak Republic (2010–2014, 2017, 2020)
- Three-time European Junior Champion U20 U20 (2011, 2013, 2015)
- 5th place místo World Amateur Go Championship, Sendai, Japan (2013)
- 1st place místo Qinling Mountains Cup, Xian, China (2014)
- 3rd place of 2nd European Grand Slam, Berlin, Germany (2016)
- 3rd place of 2nd European Professional Championship, Saint Petersburg, Russia (2017)
- 1st place in more than 55 tournaments.
