= Go apprentice =

A go apprentice (院生, insei) is a student learning to play Go at an institution, typically with the aim of becoming a professional player. In Japan, such a student is called an insei (literally, "institution student"). Institutions for insei include the Nihon Ki-in (Japanese Go Association) and the Kansai Ki-in (Kansai Go Association). The equivalent of Go insei in Korea is yeongusaeng (Korean: 연구생; Hanja: 硏究生), read kenkyūsei in Japanese and yánjiūshēng (Chinese: 研究生, also meaning "graduate student") in Chinese.

== Qualifications and study ==
In Japan, once a year 3 or 4 apprentices who qualify in a yearly tournament become professional players.

East Asian players are required to become a professional before the age of 18 while studying as insei, but foreigners have the chance up to the age of about 30.

To become an insei, a person requires a professional to sponsor them, and an application to the Nihon Ki-in. There is no official way to contact a professional for sponsorship.

While insei, many people live with their professional sponsor, who tutors and supports them. Some insei just visit their professional sponsor several times a week. The professional sponsor acts as a mentor for the insei.
