= Go professional =

Professional player of the game of Go

A Go professional is a professional player of the game of Go. The minimum standard to acquire a professional certification through one of the major Go organisations is very high. The competition is tremendous, and prize incentives for champion players are very large. For example, the Honinbo Tournament has a grand prize of about $350,000.

Almost all professional players are from China, Japan, South Korea, and Taiwan. This is because until recently, only China (China Qiyuan), Japan (Nihon Ki-in, Kansai Ki-in), South Korea (Korea Baduk Association (Hanguk Gi-Won)), and Taiwan (Taiwan Chi Yuan Culture Foundation) had professional Go organizations. In 2012, the AGA Professional System was established in the United States. In 2014, the EGF professional system was established in Europe.

Professional rankings are separate from the amateur ratings (usually 30-kyu through 7-dan). Professional rankings are 1-dan through 9-dan (sometimes written 1p through 9p). In the past, a 1-dan professional was roughly equal to a (European) 7-dan amateur. However, since the competition to become a professional has increased since the late 1990s (particularly in China and Korea), it has become the case that new 1-dan professionals are much stronger than they usually were in the past.

There have also been professional Go players from the West competing in East Asian professional associations, specifically Romania, Austria, Germany, Russia, Hungary, Australia, Finland and the United States of America.

== Reaching professional level ==
Professional dan rankings are normally awarded in Japan, China, South Korea or Taiwan, through one of the professional Go associations. The attainment of professional qualification differs in different countries:

- In China, a few amateurs are given the 1p grade as probationers, on the basis of success in amateur tournaments.
- In Japan, student professionals are called insei, and have to play in internal insei competitions to qualify; mostly they are adolescents, and must decide whether to continue based on their chances of a career in Go, or go to university. Insei rarely take part in amateur events, but some of the top amateurs are ex-insei.
- In South Korea, four amateurs become professional every year, at the top of a ferocious league system of 80 aspiring pros. Once within the professional system, promotion is based on game results.
- In Europe, the strongest players qualify or are invited to compete in a Qualification Tournament, with the top one or two players being awarded the rank of 1-dan professional. Seven such tournaments have taken place since 2014 with nine players having been granted professional status. Professional players can advance in rank by earning so-called "low dan points" and "high dan points" for beating other professionals in tournaments, competing in international tournaments and winning titles.

Most professional players begin studying Go seriously when they are children, commonly reaching professional status in their mid to late teens. Some rare students achieve professional status at a much earlier age, such as Sumire Nakamura and Cho Chikun.

In order to qualify as a first-dan professional (1p), one must have deep resources of game experience and study. In local positions, professionals are often on close ground with each other, understanding good shape, tesuji, life and death, fuseki and joseki patterns. However, in global positions they often differ in positional judgement—the global impact and interaction of josekis and differing importance of various parts of the board during the opening and middle game.

== Discrepancies among professionals ==
The strength differences between professional levels is usually considered to be no more than 2–3 handicap stones. Therefore, the difference between professional dan levels corresponds to about one-third to one-fourth of a handicap stone.

Each country has different rules for promotion. Ranks may, therefore, differ somewhat from country to country.

Professionals may also differ in actual strength for a number of reasons, such as promotion not keeping up with actual gains in strength, or the fact that professional ranks (unlike kyu or amateur dan) may rise, but never fall (even if the player grows weaker). This has posed some problems, esp. with regards to international rank discernment. There are currently over one hundred people who have the rank of 9p (the highest professional rank), though many of them no longer play competitively. A further distinction is that some 9p players regularly hold titles, others won some titles, some entered the title leagues, and many 9p never had the fortune to achieve any of the above.

Traditionally it has been uncommon for a low professional dan to beat some of the highest pro dans. But since the late-1990s it has slowly become more common. This trend has been primarily credited to the result of increased competition to become a professional player in China and Korea. The result, that new 1-dan professionals are generally stronger than other 1 dans in the past.

In Japan, the Oteai system was reformed in 2004. The goal was to help alleviate some of the rank inflation that had crept in over the years. Today's Japanese system uses various benchmarks; for example, winning certain tournaments or a certain number of games, to be promoted by a rank. The Korean and Chinese systems have also been similarly changed in the past several years. These systems have increased the importance of international tournaments by incentivising rank promotion through international placement. Recent criticism has been given to this aspect, arguing that an individual may increase many professional ranks at once through the virtue of a single competition result (such as Piao Wenyao).

== Pro and amateur dan ==
In theory, professional dans should beat all levels of amateur dans. In reality, the very top amateurs have proven very able. The conventional wisdom is that such players may achieve some of the insight of a pro, though perhaps not the detailed knowledge.

In China, Korea, and Japan, there are two distinct ranking sets, one for amateur players and one for professional players (who receive a fee for each game they play, bonuses for winning, and fees for other related activities such as teaching).

In the Japanese professional ranking system, distinction between ranks was traditionally considered to be roughly one third of a handicap stone (making the difference 3 pro dan equal to one amateur dan). The strength of new professionals (1-dan) was usually comparable to that of the highest ranked amateurs. Currently the professional ranks are assumed to be more bunched together, covering not much more than two amateur dans; so that pro 1 dans win some games against 9 dans. There are also a number of amateur players acknowledged as having pro 6 dan understanding of the game.

In South Korea, there are several amateur systems in use, with the recent introduction of official 7-, 6- and 5-dan amateur ranks, each of which is somewhat stronger than the corresponding European grade. A 7-dan amateur will have won three national events, and will be effectively of lower-ranked pro standard. The older gup system does not easily match others. In practice, in Korean clubs, grades may be worked out against the resident strongest amateur.

The Taiwan Chi Yuan Culture Foundation also employs a dan system similar to that in Japan. It ranks its professional players from beginner dan (初段) up to 9-dan, being the highest. However, the amateur ranking system is established by another organization which certifies amateur player through competitions, ranking player from beginner dan (初段) to 6-dan with 7-dan being honorary.

In Germany and the Netherlands a "classes"-system (German: "Klassen") was established by Go pioneer Bruno Rüger in 1920. It comprised a further subdivision into Kyu/Dan half-grades with classes 18 and 17 = amateur 1-dan with the 17 being on the stronger side. It was replaced by the Japanese amateur ranking system in the 1970s.

== European Professional System ==
A European professional system was established by the European Go Federation in 2014, with sponsorship from "CEGO", a partnership of Chinese investors interesting in promoting the game of go in Europe. The aims of the system are to "give the strongest players a chance to compete on the same level as the Asian pro players", "attract more media attention and therefore also attract more sponsors." Any player holding a European passport and having been a citizen of an EGF-member country for at least 10 years is eligible, providing they are not already a professional player belonging to another professional association.

The EGF also supports an "EGF Academy" that provides high-level training to the strongest young players in Europe. The Academy is a collaboration between the EGF, CEGO and the Ge Yuhong Go Academy in Beijing. Tuition is provided by both European and Asian professionals, and includes exchange programs allowing students to travel to China to study.

The first Pro Qualification Tournament was held in three European cities in the same year as the system's launch, and resulted in first Pavol Lisý of Slovakia and secondly Ali Jabarin of Israel emerging as the most successful players and thus the first two European professional players. A summary of all Qualification Tournaments is given below.

Professional Qualification Tournaments
Year	Location	Tournament Format	Players Earning Professional Status
2014	Strasbourg, Amsterdam and Vienna	Three-stage, 6-round, double knockout tournament. First player with 4 wins and subsequent player with only one loss become professional.	Pavol Lisý and Ali Jabarin.
2015	Pisa, Italy	6-round double knockout tournament. First player with 4 wins and subsequent player with only one loss become professional.	Mateusz Surma and Ilya Shikshin.
2016	Baden-Baden, Germany	6-round double knockout tournament. Overall winner becomes professional.	Artem Kachanovskyi.
2017	Vienna and Pardubice	6-round double knockout tournament. Overall winner becomes professional.	Andrii Kravets.
2019	Strasbourg	6-round double knockout tournament. Overall winner becomes professional.	Tanguy le Calvé.
2021	Leksand, Sweden	4-round, single knockout tournament. Overall winner becomes professional. All matches played as best-of-three.	Stanisław Frejlak.
2023	Brno, Czechia	Two-stage, 3-round single knockout tournament. Overall winner becomes professional. All matches played as best-of-three.	Jan Šimara.

Professional players in Europe receive various benefits. They gain automatic qualification to prestigious European tournaments, including the Grand Slam that has the largest prize pool in Europe (the overall champion won €10,000 in 2021). Furthermore, they are provided with opportunities to compete in Professional Go Leagues organised by the EGF since 2020, which are reserved only to professional players and also offer high prize pools. During major European tournaments, professional players are also paid to provide live commentary of games.

=== Professional players of the EGF ===
Seven qualification tournaments have resulted in nine European players being awarded professional status by the EGF. Promotion details of each player are given below.

Professional players of the EGF
Player	Nationality	Year became pro	Promotion history
Ilya Shikshin	Russian	2015	Promoted to 2p in 2018, to 3p in 2019, to 4p in 2021.
Artem Kachanovskyi	Ukrainian	2016	Promoted to 2p in 2018.
Pavol Lisý	Slovak	2014	Promoted to 2p in 2018.
Mateusz Surma	Polish	2015	Promoted to 2p in 2019, to 3p in 2023.
Ali Jabarin	Israeli	2014	Promoted to 2p in 2018.
Andrii Kravets	Ukrainian	2017	
Tanguy le Calvé	French	2019	
Stanisław Frejlak	Polish	2021	
Jan Šimara	Czech	2023	

== See also ==
- International Go Federation
- List of Go organizations
- List of professional Go tournaments
- Go ranks and ratings
- Go players
