= Master (software) =

Edition of the Go software AlphaGo

Master is a version of DeepMind's Go software AlphaGo, named after the account name (originally Magister/Magist) used online, which won 60 straight online games against human professional Go players from 29 December 2016 to 4 January 2017. This version was also used in the Future of Go Summit in May 2017. It used four TPUs on a single machine with Elo rating 4,858. DeepMind claimed that AlphaGo Master was 3-stone stronger than the version used in AlphaGo v. Lee Sedol.

DeepMind released a version of AlphaGo Master in December 2017 that serves as a teaching tool analyzing the win rates of 6,000 Go openings from 230,000 human games.

== Matches ==
=== Online games ===
The software was first used to play games against professional players on 29 December 2016 on the Tygem Go server, under the account name 'Magister' (shown as 'Magist' at the server's Chinese version). The account name was changed to 'Master' on 30 December. After playing 30 games on Tygem, it was moved to the FoxGo server on 1 January 2017.

Master played at the pace of 10 games per day. Many quickly suspected it to be an AI player due to little or no resting between games. After winning its 59th game it was revealed in the chatroom that Master was controlled by Aja Huang of the DeepMind team. On 4 January 2017, after these games were completed, Demis Hassabis, the co-founder of DeepMind, confirmed that Magister and Master both played using an updated version of AlphaGo and said, "We're looking forward to playing some official, full-length games later [in 2017] in collaboration with Go organizations and experts".

Gu Li, a 9-dan player and co-founder of FoxGo, offered a bounty of 100,000 RMB (14,400 USD) to the first human player who could defeat Master. However, no one took the bounty since Master's final online record was 60 wins and 0 losses, including three victories over Go's top ranked player, Ke Jie, who had been quietly briefed in advance that Master was a version of AlphaGo.

Master's adversaries included many world champions such as Ke Jie, Park Jeong-hwan, Yuta Iyama, Tuo Jiaxi, Mi Yuting, Shi Yue, Chen Yaoye, Li Qincheng, Gu Li, Chang Hao, Tang Weixing, Fan Tingyu, Zhou Ruiyang, Jiang Weijie, Chou Chun-hsun, Kim Ji-seok, Kang Dong-yun, Park Yeong-hun, and Won Seong-jin, and also included national champions or world championship runners-up such as Lian Xiao, Tan Xiao, Meng Tailing, Dang Yifei, Huang Yunsong, Yang Dingxin, Gu Zihao, Shin Jinseo, Cho Han-seung, and An Sungjoon. All 60 games except one were fast-paced games with three 20 or 30 seconds byo-yomi. Master offered to extend the byo-yomi to one minute when playing with Nie Weiping due to his old age.

No.	Date	Player (dan during the game)	Time control	Moves	Master color and result
1	29 December 2016	(China) Pan Tingyu (1 dan)	three 20-second byo-yomi	146	White won by resignation
2	29 December 2016	(China) Zhang Ziliang (1 dan)	three 20-second byo-yomi	174	White won by resignation
3	29 December 2016	(China) Ding Shixiong (3 dan)	three 20-second byo-yomi	151	Black won by resignation
4	29 December 2016	(China) Xie Erhao (4 dan)	three 20-second byo-yomi	222	White won by resignation
5	29 December 2016	(China) Yu Zhiying (5 dan)	three 20-second byo-yomi	113	Black won by resignation
6	29 December 2016	(China) Li Xiangyu (3 dan)	three 20-second byo-yomi	131	Black won by resignation
7	29 December 2016	(China) Qiao Zhijian (4 dan)	three 20-second byo-yomi	163	Black won by resignation
8	29 December 2016	(China) Han Yizhou (5 dan)	three 20-second byo-yomi	104	White won by resignation
9	29 December 2016	(China) Meng Tailing (6 dan)	three 20-second byo-yomi	275	Black won by 4.5 points
10	29 December 2016	(China) Meng Tailing (6 dan)	three 20-second byo-yomi	148	White won by resignation
11	30 December 2016	(China) Chen Hao (5 dan)	three 20-second byo-yomi	170	White won by resignation
12	30 December 2016	(South Korea) Ryu Suhang (5 dan)	three 20-second byo-yomi	144	White won by resignation
13	30 December 2016	(China) Wang Haoyang (6 dan)	three 20-second byo-yomi	136	White won by resignation
14	30 December 2016	(China) Yan Zaiming (3 dan)	three 20-second byo-yomi	129	Black won by resignation
15	30 December 2016	(South Korea) Park Junghwan (9 dan)	three 20-second byo-yomi	150	White won by time
16	30 December 2016	(China) Lian Xiao (7 dan)	three 20-second byo-yomi	122	White won by resignation
17	30 December 2016	(China) Lian Xiao (7 dan)	three 20-second byo-yomi	164	White won by resignation
18	30 December 2016	(China) Ke Jie (9 dan)	three 20-second byo-yomi	228	Black won by 5.5 points
19	30 December 2016	(China) Ke Jie (9 dan)	three 20-second byo-yomi	128	White won by resignation
20	30 December 2016	(South Korea) Park Junghwan (9 dan)	three 20-second byo-yomi	255	Black won by 5.5 points
21	31 December 2016	(China) Chen Yaoye (9 dan)	three 20-second byo-yomi	270	White won by 5.5 points
22	31 December 2016	(China) Chen Yaoye (9 dan)	three 20-second byo-yomi	277	White won by 4.5 points
23	31 December 2016	(South Korea) Kim Jung-hyun (6 dan)	three 20-second byo-yomi	135	Black won by resignation
24	31 December 2016	(South Korea) Park Junghwan (9 dan)	three 20-second byo-yomi	223	Black won by resignation
25	31 December 2016	(South Korea) Park Junghwan (9 dan)	three 20-second byo-yomi	261	White won by 0.5 points
26	31 December 2016	(South Korea) Yun Chanhee (6 dan)	three 20-second byo-yomi	217	Black won by resignation
27	31 December 2016	(China) Fan Tingyu (9 dan)	three 30-second byo-yomi	215	Black won by resignation
28	31 December 2016	(China) Meng Tailing (6 dan)	three 20-second byo-yomi	163	Black won by resignation
29	31 December 2016	(China) Mi Yuting (9 dan)	three 30-second byo-yomi	311	White won by 0.5 points
30	31 December 2016	(China) Tang Weixing (9 dan)	three 30-second byo-yomi	186	White won by resignation
31	1 January 2017	(China) Li Qincheng (9 dan)	1 minute + three 20-second byo-yomi	179	Black won by resignation
32	2 January 2017	(China) Gu Li (9 dan)	1 minute + three 30-second byo-yomi	154	White won by resignation
33	2 January 2017	(China) Gu Li (9 dan)	1 minute + three 30-second byo-yomi	191	Black won by resignation
34	2 January 2017	(China) Dang Yifei (9 dan)	1 minute + three 30-second byo-yomi	149	Black won by resignation
35	2 January 2017	(China) Jiang Weijie (9 dan)	1 minute + three 30-second byo-yomi	280	White won by 1.5 points
36	2 January 2017	(China) Gu Zihao (5 dan)	1 minute + three 30-second byo-yomi	209	Black won by resignation
37	2 January 2017	(South Korea) Park Yeong-hun (9 dan)	1 minute + three 30-second byo-yomi	173	Black won by resignation
38	2 January 2017	(China) Tuo Jiaxi (9 dan)	1 minute + three 30-second byo-yomi	239	Black won by resignation
39	2 January 2017	(Japan) Yuta Iyama (9 dan)	1 minute + three 30-second byo-yomi	135	Black won by resignation
40	2 January 2017	(China) Meng Tailing (6 dan)	1 minute + three 30-second byo-yomi	274	White won by 2.5 points
41	2 January 2017	(South Korea) Kim Ji-seok (9 dan)	1 minute + three 30-second byo-yomi	170	White won by resignation
42	3 January 2017	(China) Yang Dingxin (4 dan)	1 minute + three 30-second byo-yomi	125	Black won by resignation
43	3 January 2017	(South Korea) Kang Dong-yun (9 dan)	1 minute + three 30-second byo-yomi	165	Black won by resignation
44	3 January 2017	(South Korea) An Sung-joon (7 dan)	1 minute + three 30-second byo-yomi	260	White won by 2.5 points
45	3 January 2017	(China) Shi Yue (9 dan)	1 minute + three 30-second byo-yomi	167	Black won by resignation
46	3 January 2017	(China) Lian Xiao (7 dan)	1 minute + three 30-second byo-yomi	144	White won by resignation
47	3 January 2017	(China) Tan Xiao (7 dan)	1 minute + three 30-second byo-yomi	191	Black won by resignation
48	3 January 2017	(South Korea) Park Junghwan (9 dan)	1 minute + three 30-second byo-yomi	270	White won by 1.5 points
49	3 January 2017	(South Korea) Won Seong-jin (9 dan)	1 minute + three 30-second byo-yomi	222	White won by resignation
50	3 January 2017	(China) Ke Jie (9 dan)	1 minute + three 30-second byo-yomi	178	White won by resignation
51	4 January 2017	(Taiwan) Chou Chun-hsun (9 dan)	1 minute + three 30-second byo-yomi	118	White won by resignation
52	4 January 2017	(China) Fan Tingyu (9 dan)	1 minute + three 30-second byo-yomi	202	White won by resignation
53	4 January 2017	(China) Huang Yunsong (5 dan)	1 minute + three 30-second byo-yomi	133	Black won by resignation
54	4 January 2017	(China) Nie Weiping (9 dan)	1 minute + three 60-second byo-yomi	254	Black won by 7.5 points
55	4 January 2017	(China) Chen Yaoye (9 dan)	1 minute + three 30-second byo-yomi	267	White won by 1.5 points
56	4 January 2017	(South Korea) Cho Han-seung (9 dan)	1 minute + three 30-second byo-yomi	171	Black won by resignation
57	4 January 2017	(South Korea) Shin Jin-seo (6 dan)	1 minute + three 30-second byo-yomi	139	Black won by resignation
58	4 January 2017	(China) Chang Hao (9 dan)	1 minute + three 30-second byo-yomi	178	White won by resignation
59	4 January 2017	(China) Zhou Ruiyang (9 dan)	1 minute + three 30-second byo-yomi	161	Black won by resignation
60	4 January 2017	(China) Gu Li (9 dan)	1 minute + three 30-second byo-yomi	235	White won by 2.5 points

=== Future of Go Summit ===
The Master version also participated in the Future of Go summit in May 2017. It defeated Ke Jie in a three-game match by three to zero and beat a human team with five top Go professionals.

== Innovative moves ==
Go experts were extremely impressed by Master's performance and by its non-human play style in its online games. Ke Jie stated, "After humanity spent thousands of years improving our tactics, computers tell us that humans are completely wrong... I would go as far as to say not a single human has touched the edge of the truth of Go".

Master played many innovative moves and inspired professional players.

In the 23rd online game Master invaded the 3-3 point at a very early stage.

Online game 23, Master (black) v. Kim Jung-hyun

In the 24th online game Master played six stones along the second line.

Online game 24 Master (black) v. Park Junghwan

== Operator errors ==
On 20 January 2017, DeepMind team members Fan Hui and Aja Huang disclosed that Master's operator accidentally entered a move other than AlphaGo's choice in two situations during the online games.

In the 9th online game, Master recommended point a for Move 107.

Online game 9, Master (black) v. Meng Tailing.

In the 39th online game, Master recommended point a for Move 99.

Online game 39, Master (black) v. Yuta Iyama

== Example game ==
Online game 30: Master (white) v. Tang Weixing (31 December 2016), Master won by resignation. White 36 was widely praised.

First 99 moves

Moves 100-186 (149 at 131, 150 at 130)
