= Huang Shijie =

People named Huang Shijie may refer to:

- Huang Shier-chieh (黃世杰; born 1979), Taiwanese politician who elected member of Taoyuan City Constituency II in 2020
- Aja Huang (黃士傑; born 1978), Taiwanese computer scientist
