= Aja Huang =

Taiwanese computer scientist

Aja Huang (Chinese: 黃士傑; pinyin: Huáng Shìjié; Wade–Giles: Huang Shih-chieh; born 1978) is a Taiwanese computer scientist and expert on artificial intelligence. He works for DeepMind and was a member of the AlphaGo project.

Born in 1978, Huang received a bachelor's degree from National Chiao Tung University in 2001, a master's degree from National Taiwan Normal University in 2003, and a Ph.D degree from National Taiwan Normal University in 2011. One of his doctoral supervisors was Rémi Coulom. He began to develop computer Go program Erica in 2004, which became the champion in the 2010 Computer Olympiad.

Huang joined DeepMind in 2012 and became a member of AlphaGo project in 2014. He is one of the first authors of DeepMind's paper on AlphaGo Fan in 2016 and a major author of the paper on AlphaGo Zero in 2017. During the 2016 match AlphaGo v. Lee Sedol and the 2017 Future of Go Summit, Huang placed stones on the Go board for AlphaGo.
