= AlphaGo versus Ke Jie =

Go match in May 2017

AlphaGo versus Ke Jie was a three-game Go match between the computer Go program AlphaGo Master and current world No. 1 ranking player Ke Jie, being part of the Future of Go Summit in Wuzhen, China, played on 23, 25, and 27 May 2017. AlphaGo defeated Ke Jie in all three games.

Match	Date	Black	White	Result	Moves	
1	23 May 2017	Ke Jie	AlphaGo	W+0.5	289	sgf
2	25 May 2017	AlphaGo	Ke Jie	B+Res	155	sgf
3	27 May 2017	AlphaGo	Ke Jie	B+Res	209	sgf
Result: AlphaGo 3–0 Ke Jie

== Background ==
At the time of the match Ke Jie was ranked 1st among all human players worldwide under Rémi Coulom's ranking system, and had held that position since late 2014. Ke Jie was also ranked number one in the world under Korea Baduk Association's, Japan Go Association's and Chinese Weiqi Association's ranking systems.

The version of AlphaGo in this match was AlphaGo Master, the one that defeated top pros in 60 online games, using four TPUs on a single machine with Elo rating 4,858. DeepMind claimed that this version was 3-stone stronger than the version used in AlphaGo v. Lee Sedol. AlphaGo Master was actually the second best version that DeepMind had at the time, for it was already in possession of AlphaGo Zero, a version much stronger than the Master version; this can be known by the fact that Nature received their paper on AlphaGo Zero on April 7, before the games with Ke Jie. DeepMind did not reveal the existence of AlphaGo Zero until the paper was published in Nature in October 2017.

Before the Future of Go Summit, AlphaGo Master defeated Ke Jie by three to zero during its 60 straight wins in the online games at the end of 2016 and beginning of 2017.

== Games ==
=== Summary ===
Google DeepMind offered $1.5 million winner prizes for this match while the losing side took $300,000 for participating in the three games. AlphaGo won all three games against Ke Jie. After the match between AlphaGo and Ke Jie, AlphaGo retired while DeepMind continued AI research in other areas. AlphaGo was subsequently awarded a professional 9-dan title by the Chinese Weiqi Association.

=== Game 1 ===
On 23 May, AlphaGo (white) won by 0.5 points.

Go board, 19 by 19. Moves: 1 black R16; 2 white Q4; 3 black C17; 4 white C4; 5 black O17; 6 white F4; 7 black R3; 8 white Q3; 9 black R4; 10 white R6; 11 black R5; 12 white Q5; 13 black S6; 14 white R2; 15 black S2; 16 white S7; 17 black Q2; 18 white P2; 19 black Q6; 20 white R7; 21 black R1; 22 white P6; 23 black D10; 24 white O9; 25 black Q12; 26 white C12; 27 black C14; 28 white E12; 29 black C11; 30 white D15; 31 black D14; 32 white D17; 33 black C16; 34 white D16; 35 black E14; 36 white D11; 37 black E11; 38 white D12; 39 black C10; 40 white C15; 41 black B15; 42 white B14; 43 black B13; 44 white B16; 45 black A14; 46 white B17; 47 black F11; 48 white C7; 49 black H3; 50 white E9; 51 black F12; 52 white G3; 53 black H4; 54 white E10; 55 black E3; 56 white G2; 57 black C3; 58 white D4; 59 black D3; 60 white E4; 61 black B4; 62 white B12; 63 black A12; 64 white B5; 65 black B3; 66 white F13; 67 black G13; 68 white L4; 69 black L5; 70 white K5; 71 black K6; 72 white J6; 73 black K4; 74 white J5; 75 black M4; 76 white L3; 77 black M3; 78 white L2; 79 black M2; 80 white J2; 81 black L6; 82 white J8; 83 black P3; 84 white Q14; 85 black O12; 86 white S14; 87 black P16; 88 white R11; 89 black R13; 90 white S16; 91 black R14; 92 white R15; 93 black Q15; 94 white S15; 95 black R17; 96 white S13; 97 black L12; 98 white J17; 99 black G17.463329998595443334871904140309392944542273135849186436667899663622638285197852529363747883923545024824820167271812219101364747069121161458606537368752965575955524976778387568078791817141521
First 99 moves

Go board, 19 by 19. Black stones: C17, G17, O17, R17, C16, P16, R16, B15, Q15, A14, C14, D14, E14, R14, B13, G13, R13, A12, F12, L12, O12, Q12, C11, E11, F11, C10, D10, K6, L6, Q6, S6, L5, R5, B4, H4, K4, M4, R4, B3, C3, D3, E3, H3, M3, P3, R3, M2, Q2, S2, R1. White stones: B17, D17, J17, B16, D16, S16, C15, D15, R15, S15, Q14, S14, F13, S13, B12, C12, D12, E12, D11, R11, E10, E9, O9, J8, C7, R7, S7, J6, P6, R6, B5, J5, K5, Q5, C4, D4, E4, F4, L4, Q4, G3, L3, Q3, G2, J2, L2, P2. Moves: 0 white L17; 1 black K16; 2 white J16; 3 black G15; 4 white H18; 5 black G18; 6 white K14; 7 black K15; 8 white J15; 9 black M16; 10 white H13; 11 black E13; 12 white M17; 13 black M15; 14 white H14; 15 black R12; 16 white S12; 17 black Q11; 18 white R10; 19 black G9; 20 white F16; 21 black G16; 22 white M14; 23 black N14; 24 white M13; 25 black G7; 26 white G6; 27 black F6; 28 white G5; 29 black D8; 30 white N5; 31 black P5; 32 white Q7; 33 black P4; 34 white N13; 35 black O14; 36 white M5; 37 black O6; 38 white M7; 40 white D9; 41 black C9; 42 white C8; 43 black E8; 44 white B9; 45 black B11; 46 white M11; 47 black J11; 48 white D1; 49 black D2; 50 white H11; 51 black J9; 52 white K9; 53 black J10; 54 white N16; 55 black N17; 56 white L15; 57 black N15; 58 white L16; 59 black P7; 60 white M1; 61 black N1; 62 white L1; 63 black O2; 64 white O13; 65 black P13; 66 white E1; 67 black C1; 68 white F2; 69 black E2; 70 white F1; 71 black B1; 72 white H8; 73 black Q8; 74 white R8; 75 black S17; 76 white S5; 77 black S4; 78 white T6; 79 black H7; 80 white J7; 81 black L9; 82 white L10; 83 black M9; 84 white K8; 85 black N10; 86 white N11; 87 black O10; 88 white Q9; 89 black F7; 90 white C6; 91 black P8; 92 white P9; 93 black O11; 94 white J12; 95 black K11; 96 white N18; 97 black O18; 98 white M18; 99 black F15. Marks: triangle on black stone at Q6.05049896970012557520210201580954990308075613571406222335111024346465941516455047954686931753828587184441401951528183928842294372849173748925798038593290272637△7828363031763377496968637167486670626061
Moves 100–199 (139 at)

Go board, 19 by 19. Black stones: G18, O18, C17, G17, N17, O17, R17, S17, C16, G16, K16, M16, P16, R16, B15, F15, G15, K15, M15, N15, Q15, A14, C14, D14, E14, N14, O14, R14, B13, E13, G13, P13, R13, A12, F12, L12, O12, Q12, R12, B11, C11, E11, F11, J11, K11, O11, Q11, C10, D10, J10, N10, O10, C9, G9, J9, L9, M9, D8, E8, P8, Q8, F7, G7, H7, P7, F6, K6, L6, O6, Q6, L5, P5, R5, B4, H4, K4, M4, P4, R4, S4, B3, C3, D3, E3, H3, M3, P3, R3, D2, E2, M2, O2, Q2, S2, B1, C1, N1, R1. White stones: H18, M18, N18, B17, D17, J17, L17, M17, B16, D16, F16, J16, L16, N16, S16, C15, D15, J15, L15, R15, S15, H14, K14, M14, Q14, S14, F13, H13, M13, N13, O13, S13, B12, C12, D12, E12, J12, S12, D11, H11, M11, N11, R11, E10, L10, R10, B9, D9, E9, K9, O9, P9, Q9, C8, H8, J8, K8, R8, C7, J7, M7, Q7, R7, S7, C6, G6, J6, R6, T6, B5, G5, J5, K5, M5, N5, S5, C4, D4, E4, F4, L4, G3, L3, F2, G2, J2, L2, P2, D1, E1, F1, L1, M1. Moves: 0 white C18; 1 black N4; 2 white N7; 3 black E18; 4 white O19; 5 black P19; 6 white N19; 7 black R18; 8 white B10; 9 black A11; 10 white A10; 11 black A13; 12 white G8; 13 black F9; 14 white B8; 15 black L13; 16 white L14; 17 black J18; 18 white K18; 19 black G19; 20 white H19; 21 black E16; 22 white E17; 23 black F17; 24 white G14; 25 black F14; 26 white G10; 27 black H9; 28 white H12; 29 black F10; 30 white O5; 31 black F3; 32 white H2; 33 black L8; 34 white L7; 35 black N6; 36 white M6; 37 black O8; 38 white D18; 39 black D19; 40 white C19; 41 black E19; 42 white O4; 43 black O3; 44 white P10; 45 black P11; 46 white E6; 47 black E7; 48 white E5; 49 black D7; 50 white D6; 51 black T4; 52 white T5; 53 black H6; 54 white H5; 55 black H17; 56 white J19; 57 black A5; 58 white A6; 59 black A4; 60 white T17; 61 black T18; 62 white T16; 63 black K13; 64 white A16; 65 black G12; 66 white A15; 67 black E15; 68 white N8; 69 black N9; 70 white Q10; 71 black B14; 72 white O7; 73 black P6; 74 white H15; 75 black J13; 76 white L11; 77 black K12; 78 white F8; 79 black K10; 80 white F5; 81 black H10; 82 white G11; 83 black M8; 84 white K7; 85 black M12; 86 white N12; 87 black M10; 88 white J14; 89 black H16.403941192056060405003803171807612223556064218962666774712524881611756315652877858609827645100829268179874470132769147812338368374947843402725850465336357357488054305259014251314332
Moves 200–289

=== Game 2 ===
The second game was played on 25 May. About 1 hour into the game, Demis Hassabis tweeted that according to AlphaGo's evaluations, Ke was playing perfectly. However, Ke later lost ground on the lower part of the board. About 4 hours into the game, AlphaGo simplified the position, and it became clear that Ke was losing.

AlphaGo (black) won by resignation after move 155.

Go board, 19 by 19. Moves: 1 black R4; 2 white Q16; 3 black C3; 4 white C16; 5 black E17; 6 white P3; 7 black Q6; 8 white D14; 9 black O17; 10 white R14; 11 black Q17; 12 white R17; 13 black R18; 14 white P17; 15 black Q18; 16 white P16; 17 black P18; 18 white S17; 19 black O16; 20 white N18; 21 black M17; 22 white M18; 23 black R16; 24 white S16; 25 black K17; 26 white N17; 27 black Q15; 28 white P15; 29 black M16; 30 white L4; 31 black J3; 32 white F4; 33 black D6; 34 white J5; 35 black C12; 36 white C8; 37 black E12; 38 white C13; 39 black B13; 40 white B14; 41 black F6; 42 white E7; 43 black E6; 44 white E9; 45 black L3; 46 white M3; 47 black M4; 48 white K3; 49 black L2; 50 white K4; 51 black K2; 52 white N3; 53 black J4; 54 white H5; 55 black G4; 56 white D3; 57 black G5; 58 white C4; 59 black M5; 60 white L6; 61 black M6; 62 white L7; 63 black D4; 64 white H4; 65 black H3; 66 white G3; 67 black G2; 68 white F3; 69 black H6; 70 white K5; 71 black F2; 72 white D5; 73 black C5; 74 white E4; 75 black B4; 76 white N16; 77 black O15; 78 white P14; 79 black M7; 80 white M15; 81 black L8; 82 white K8; 83 black G8; 84 white L9; 85 black M8; 86 white K9; 87 black N10; 88 white G10; 89 black Q3; 90 white Q2; 91 black R2; 92 white Q5; 93 black R5; 94 white P6; 95 black P4; 96 white O4; 97 black Q7; 98 white P7; 99 black O5.222017151352521269141112184297619162232480772827408781039383537888744868436838281854262799897334341696061947737257543470599992937558637432556453503047969513566866653148454652689716751499091
First 99 moves

Go board, 19 by 19. Black stones: P18, Q18, R18, E17, K17, M17, O17, Q17, M16, O16, R16, O15, Q15, B13, C12, E12, N10, G8, L8, M8, M7, Q7, D6, E6, F6, H6, M6, Q6, C5, G5, M5, O5, R5, B4, G4, J4, M4, P4, R4, C3, H3, J3, L3, Q3, F2, G2, K2, L2, R2. White stones: M18, N18, N17, P17, R17, S17, C16, N16, P16, Q16, S16, M15, P15, B14, D14, P14, R14, C13, G10, E9, K9, L9, C8, K8, E7, L7, P7, L6, P6, D5, H5, J5, K5, Q5, C4, E4, F4, H4, K4, L4, O4, D3, F3, G3, K3, M3, N3, P3, Q2. Moves: 0 white B5; 1 black D4; 2 white P5; 3 black Q4; 5 black C6; 6 white O8; 7 black M9; 8 white N5; 9 black Q8; 10 white O10; 11 black O11; 12 white P9; 13 black O14; 14 white N11; 15 black M11; 16 white N12; 17 black P13; 18 white Q14; 19 black L11; 20 white J10; 21 black M13; 22 white O12; 23 black P11; 24 white P12; 25 black Q10; 26 white Q12; 27 black Q9; 28 white B3; 30 white K13; 31 black L13; 33 black K6; 34 white J6; 36 white F5; 38 white G6; 39 black L15; 40 white N15; 41 black K14; 42 white K18; 43 black J17; 44 white J18; 45 black E2; 46 white H17; 47 black C17; 48 white B17; 49 black D16; 50 white C18; 51 black C15; 52 white D17; 53 black C14; 54 white D13; 55 black B15. Marks: triangle on white stone at C4.5044424847524643495551394053411318543031211716222426191514112320102507122706090538343300360802△01032845
Moves 100–155 (104/132/137 at, 129/135 at 101)

=== Game 3 ===
On 27 May, Ke Jie (white) resigned in game three, finishing the series with a 3–0 win for AlphaGo. At resignation, AlphaGo (black) had roughly an hour and a half of its time remaining, while Ke Jie had roughly 32 minutes left on the clock.

Go board, 19 by 19. Moves: 1 black Q4; 2 white D4; 3 black Q17; 4 white D16; 5 black F3; 6 white C6; 7 black R12; 8 white R6; 9 black R5; 10 white Q6; 11 black O4; 12 white Q9; 13 black R10; 14 white E3; 15 black F4; 16 white K3; 17 black M3; 18 white H3; 19 black F7; 20 white O2; 21 black D7; 22 white D6; 23 black E6; 24 white E8; 25 black E7; 26 white B8; 27 black C9; 28 white R3; 29 black Q3; 30 white Q2; 31 black O3; 32 white Q16; 33 black P17; 34 white P11; 35 black S3; 36 white Q13; 37 black R16; 38 white R13; 39 black F2; 40 white G5; 41 black C3; 42 white C8; 43 black D8; 44 white D9; 45 black C10; 46 white D10; 47 black D11; 48 white F10; 49 black C12; 50 white C4; 51 black D3; 52 white B11; 53 black C11; 54 white E4; 55 black E2; 56 white B3; 57 black B2; 58 white H7; 59 black G11; 60 white G10; 61 black H10; 62 white F11; 63 black E10; 64 white S2; 65 black S4; 66 white M2; 67 black L2; 68 white N2; 69 black L3; 70 white K2; 71 black K1; 72 white P2; 73 black L5; 74 white K6; 75 black L6; 76 white K7; 77 black M8; 78 white S7; 79 black P7; 80 white P6; 81 black O7; 82 white O6; 83 black N6; 84 white R15; 85 black Q15; 86 white S16; 87 black P16; 88 white S14; 89 black G9; 90 white F9; 91 black G8; 92 white L8; 93 black M9; 94 white L9; 95 black G12; 96 white M10; 97 black N10; 98 white L10; 99 black F17.993334873237868584883638499575253476259344546634860619896971327449089949312264243249192772125195876817978622237475838280108407395025415111655641511451816691731292835575539706766682072306471
First 99 moves

Go board, 19 by 19. Black stones: F17, P17, Q17, P16, R16, Q15, C12, G12, R12, C11, D11, G11, C10, E10, H10, N10, R10, C9, G9, M9, D8, G8, M8, D7, E7, F7, O7, P7, E6, L6, N6, L5, R5, F4, O4, Q4, S4, C3, D3, F3, L3, M3, O3, Q3, S3, B2, E2, F2, L2, K1. White stones: D16, S16, R15, S14, Q13, R13, B11, F11, P11, D10, F10, G10, L10, M10, D9, F9, L9, Q9, B8, C8, E8, L8, H7, K7, S7, C6, D6, K6, O6, P6, Q6, R6, G5, C4, D4, E4, B3, E3, H3, K3, R3, K2, M2, N2, O2, P2, Q2, S2. Moves: 0 white C14; 1 black D18; 2 white C17; 3 black F15; 4 white G16; 5 black F16; 6 white C18; 7 black D14; 8 white G13; 9 black F12; 10 white E14; 11 black D15; 12 white C15; 13 black K16; 14 white M17; 15 black M16; 16 white G17; 17 black F18; 18 white L16; 19 black L15; 20 white L17; 21 black J17; 22 white M15; 23 black N16; 24 white K15; 25 black L14; 26 white K14; 27 black K13; 28 white L13; 29 black M14; 30 white J13; 31 black K12; 32 white J12; 33 black G15; 34 white H15; 35 black H16; 36 white J15; 37 black K17; 38 white H17; 39 black H18; 40 white J16; 41 black G18; 42 white N5; 43 black M7; 44 white O5; 45 black M5; 46 white O9; 47 black J2; 48 white J3; 49 black H2; 50 white R18; 51 black R17; 52 white S18; 53 black R8; 54 white Q8; 55 black Q7; 56 white R7; 57 black S8; 58 white S11; 59 black R9; 60 white R11; 61 black S17; 62 white T17; 63 black C7; 64 white B7; 65 black E5; 66 white B4; 67 black S6; 68 white T7; 69 black T2; 70 white M1; 71 black L1; 72 white T6; 73 black S1; 74 white R2; 75 black S5; 76 white R1; 77 black B9; 78 white A2; 79 black C2; 80 white A6; 81 black N14; 82 white L12; 83 black C13; 84 white Q18; 85 black P18; 86 white B13; 87 black B12; 88 white B14; 89 black P12; 90 white Q12; 91 black O11; 92 white P10; 93 black J9; 94 white F13; 95 black K11; 96 white J11; 97 black K10; 98 white H11; 99 black J8.06011741398584505202163821372014516162050435401318152312110333343624192288000710262529818683940830272887093231828990989695916058979277934659995453576463435556688067726545424475664878794947746971707673
Moves 100–199

Go board, 19 by 19. Black stones: D18, F18, G18, H18, P18, F17, J17, K17, P17, Q17, R17, S17, F16, K16, M16, N16, P16, R16, D15, F15, G15, L15, Q15, D14, L14, M14, N14, C13, K13, B12, C12, F12, G12, K12, P12, R12, C11, D11, G11, K11, O11, C10, E10, H10, K10, N10, R10, B9, C9, G9, J9, M9, R9, D8, G8, J8, M8, R8, S8, C7, D7, E7, F7, M7, O7, P7, Q7, E6, L6, N6, S6, E5, L5, M5, R5, S5, F4, O4, Q4, S4, C3, D3, F3, L3, M3, O3, Q3, S3, B2, C2, E2, F2, H2, J2, L2, T2, K1, L1, S1. White stones: C18, Q18, R18, S18, C17, G17, H17, L17, M17, T17, D16, G16, J16, L16, S16, C15, H15, J15, K15, M15, R15, B14, C14, E14, K14, S14, B13, F13, G13, J13, L13, Q13, R13, J12, L12, Q12, B11, F11, H11, J11, P11, R11, S11, D10, F10, G10, L10, M10, P10, D9, F9, L9, O9, Q9, B8, C8, E8, L8, Q8, B7, H7, K7, R7, S7, T7, A6, C6, D6, K6, O6, P6, Q6, R6, T6, G5, N5, O5, B4, C4, D4, E4, B3, E3, H3, J3, K3, R3, A2, K2, M2, N2, O2, P2, Q2, R2, S2, M1, R1. Moves: 0 white E12; 1 black E9; 2 white N12; 3 black N11; 4 white J10; 5 black K9; 6 white O12; 7 black M11; 8 white H9; 9 black H8.00020607030401080509
Moves 200–209

== Coverage ==
The match was barred from being live-streamed in China. The game however has been covered in China both online and on national television via Zhejiang TV.

== See also ==
- AlphaGo versus Fan Hui
- AlphaGo versus Lee Sedol
