= Tygem =

Tygem (Korean: 타이젬바둑) is an internet go server owned by South Korean company TongYang Online. Popular in Asia, their website states that over 500 professional Go players use their service.

Tygem was founded as ICBL by Cho Hun-hyun in 2000, and renamed to Tygem in 2001, invested by Tongyang Group and JoongAng Ilbo.

In October 2015, AlphaGo from DeepMind beat the 2013, 2014, 2015 and 2016 European Go champion Fan Hui from France five to zero. Eight million positions from human games on the Tygem server were used to train AlphaGo.
