= AlphaGo versus Fan Hui =

Go match in 2015

AlphaGo versus Fan Hui was a five-game Go match between European champion Fan Hui, a 2-dan (out of 9 dan possible) professional, and AlphaGo, a computer Go program developed by DeepMind, held at DeepMind's headquarters in London in October 2015. AlphaGo won all five games. This was the first time a computer Go program had beaten a professional human player on a full-sized board without handicap. This match was not disclosed to the public until 27 January 2016 to coincide with the publication of a paper in the journal Nature describing the algorithms AlphaGo used.

Fan described the program as "very strong and stable, it seems like a wall. ... I know AlphaGo is a computer, but if no one told me, maybe I would think the player was a little strange, but a very strong player, a real person."

== Games ==
=== Summary ===
In this match, DeepMind used AlphaGo's distributed version with 1,202 CPUs and 176 GPUs with Elo rating 3,144. For each game there was a one-hour set time limit for each player followed by three 30-second byo-yomi overtime periods.

Game	Date	Black	White	Result	Moves
1	5 October 2015	Fan Hui	AlphaGo	White won 2.5 points	272
2	6 October 2015	AlphaGo	Fan Hui	Black won by resignation	183
3	7 October 2015	Fan Hui	AlphaGo	White won by resignation	166
4	8 October 2015	AlphaGo	Fan Hui	Black won by resignation	165
5	9 October 2015	Fan Hui	AlphaGo	White won by resignation	214
Result: AlphaGo 5 – 0 Fan Hui

During this match, AlphaGo and Fan Hui also played another five informal games with shorter time control (each player having just three 30-second byo-yomi) and AlphaGo defeated Fan by three to two.

=== Game 1 ===
Fan Hui (black) v. AlphaGo (white), 5 October 2015, AlphaGo won by 2.5 points.

First 99 moves

Moves 100–199

Moves 200–272 (234 at; 250 at)

=== Game 2 ===
AlphaGo (black) v. Fan Hui (white), 6 October 2015, AlphaGo won by resignation. Although the white stones at the lower-left corner could have been captured if black 135 had been placed at "a", AlphaGo's choice might be safer to win.

First 99 moves

Moves 100–183 (182 at 169)

=== Game 3 ===
Fan Hui (black) v. AlphaGo (white), 7 October 2015, AlphaGo won by resignation.

First 99 moves

Moves 100–166

=== Game 4 ===
AlphaGo (black) v. Fan Hui (white), 8 October 2015, AlphaGo won by resignation.

First 99 moves (96 at 10)

Moves 100-165

=== Game 5 ===
Fan Hui (black) v. AlphaGo (white), 9 October 2015, AlphaGo won by resignation. Black 75 should be placed at 83, and Fan Hui missed the opportunity.

First 99 moves (90 at 15)

Moves 100–199 (151/157/163 at 141, 154/160 at 148)

Moves 200–214

== Responses ==
AlphaGo's victory shocked the Go community. Lee Sedol commented that AlphaGo reached the top of the amateur level in this match, but had not yet reached the professional level, and he could give AlphaGo one or two stones. Ke Jie and Mi Yuting thought that the strength of AlphaGo in this match was equal to that of a candidate for Go professional, and extremely close to the professional level, while Shi Yue thought that it already reached the professional level. "It was terrifying," said Ke Jie, "that AlphaGo could learn and evolve although its power was still limited then."

Canadian AI specialist Jonathan Schaeffer, comparing AlphaGo with a "child prodigy" that lacked experience, considered this match "not yet a Deep Blue moment", and said that the real achievement would be "when the program plays a player in the true top echelon".

== See also ==
- AlphaGo versus Lee Sedol
- AlphaGo versus Ke Jie
