= Future of Go Summit =

2017 Google public event in China

The Future of Go Summit (Chinese: 中国乌镇围棋峰会) was a Go games summit held in May 2017 in Wuzhen, Zhejiang, China, by the Chinese Go Association, the Zhejiang Provincial Sort Bureau, and Google. It featured five Go games involving AlphaGo and top Chinese Go players, as well as a forum on the future of artificial intelligence.

This summit was Google’s biggest public event in partnership with the Chinese government since Google China's search engine was moved out of mainland China to Hong Kong due to the government censorship in 2010. It was seen as a charm offensive launched by Google toward Chinese officials, being part of effort to reopen China's market.

The version of AlphaGo used in this Summit was AlphaGo Master, using four TPUs on a single machine with an Elo rating of 4,858. DeepMind claimed that this version was 3 stones stronger in games of self-play than the version used in AlphaGo v. Lee Sedol.

After winning its three-game match against Chinese grandmaster Ke Jie, the world's top Go player, AlphaGo was awarded professional 9-duan by Chinese Weiqi Association. DeepMind announced that AlphaGo would retire, and DeepMind would disband the team that worked on Go and spend their time exploring new AI in other areas instead of Go. After the Summit, DeepMind released 50 games AlphaGo played against itself.

== Schedule ==
- Ke Jie vs. AlphaGo. 23, 25 and 27 May, all of them from 10:30 – 17:30 UTC+8.
- Pair Go: Gu Li and AlphaGo vs. Lian Xiao and AlphaGo. Friday 26 May, 8:30 – 12:30, UTC+8.
- Team Tournament: AlphaGo vs. Chinese team (Chen Yaoye, Mi Yuting, Shi Yue, Tang Weixing, Zhou Ruiyang). Friday 26 May, 13:30 – 18:30, UTC+8.

== Games ==
=== Ke Jie vs AlphaGo ===
Match	Date	Black	White	Time control	Result	Moves
1	23 May 2017	Ke Jie	AlphaGo	3 hours + five 60-second byo-yomi	W+0.5	289
2	25 May 2017	AlphaGo	Ke Jie	3 hours + five 60-second byo-yomi	B+Res	155
3	27 May 2017	AlphaGo	Ke Jie	3 hours + five 60-second byo-yomi	B+Res	209
Result: AlphaGo 3 – 0 Ke Jie

Google DeepMind offered 1.5 million dollars winner prizes for this match while the losing side took 300,000 dollars for participating in the three games. AlphaGo won all three games.

=== Pair Go ===
Match	Date	Black	White	Time control	Result	Moves
Pair Go	26 May 2017	AlphaGo + Gu Li	AlphaGo+ Lian Xiao	1 hour + one 60-second byo-yomi	W+Res	220

The pair Go game was played on 26 May morning. Gu Li, an eight-time world champion, and Lian Xiao, the current Chinese Mingren and Tianyuan titles holder, each had their own AlphaGo teammate, alternating moves in tag team style. The move sequence was Gu Li (black), Lian Xiao (white), AlphaGo (black), and AlphaGo (white).

Go board, 19 by 19. Moves: 1 black Q16; 2 white C17; 3 black R4; 4 white D3; 5 black C5; 6 white P3; 7 black Q3; 8 white P4; 9 black Q6; 10 white L4; 11 black E4; 12 white F3; 13 black E3; 14 white E2; 15 black D4; 16 white C3; 17 black D2; 18 white C2; 19 black F2; 20 white D1; 21 black G3; 22 white Q14; 23 black H6; 24 white O17; 25 black O16; 26 white N16; 27 black O15; 28 white P17; 29 black Q15; 30 white R10; 31 black N2; 32 white N3; 33 black M3; 34 white Q2; 35 black N4; 36 white N5; 37 black M4; 38 white Q4; 39 black R3; 40 white R5; 41 black Q5; 42 white R6; 43 black R7; 44 white S7; 45 black Q7; 46 white S4; 47 black S3; 48 white S5; 49 black R2; 50 white P2; 51 black S8; 52 white R1; 53 black T2; 54 white S1; 55 black T7; 56 white S2; 57 black S6; 58 white T3; 59 black M5; 60 white R18; 61 black R12; 62 white D11; 63 black D16; 64 white D17; 65 black F16; 66 white D15; 67 black R14; 68 white M10; 69 black L16; 70 white K10; 71 black M18; 72 white M17; 73 black L17; 74 white N18; 75 black N10; 76 white M11; 77 black N11; 78 white N9; 79 black N12; 80 white K7; 81 black L8; 82 white K8; 83 black N8; 84 white E16; 85 black F15; 86 white H17; 87 black G17; 88 white H16; 89 black H14; 90 white G14; 91 black E15; 92 white C16; 93 black G13; 94 white G15; 95 black F13; 96 white H13; 97 black E13; 98 white H12; 99 black J14.717460264878673722428926384658869262516691859427299089992267979593969879616276777068753078828183518045434455239425755936414048151110373583834616413122133326739475818171419315034495653205254
First 99 moves

Go board, 19 by 19. Black stones: M18, G17, L17, F16, L16, O16, Q16, E15, F15, O15, Q15, H14, J14, R14, E13, F13, G13, N12, R12, N11, N10, L8, N8, S8, Q7, R7, T7, H6, Q6, S6, C5, M5, Q5, D4, E4, M4, N4, E3, G3, M3, F2, N2, T2. White stones: N18, R18, C17, D17, H17, M17, O17, P17, C16, E16, H16, N16, D15, G15, G14, Q14, H13, H12, D11, M11, K10, M10, R10, N9, K8, K7, R6, N5, R5, S5, L4, P4, Q4, S4, C3, D3, F3, N3, P3, T3, C2, E2, P2, Q2, S2, D1, R1, S1. Moves: 0 white K15; 1 black K14; 2 white L15; 3 black H11; 4 white G12; 5 black E11; 6 white G11; 7 black G10; 8 white F10; 9 black E10; 10 white F9; 11 black C14; 12 white H18; 13 black K12; 14 white M15; 15 black M12; 16 white J11; 17 black E9; 18 white F8; 19 black H8; 20 white G5; 21 black G6; 22 white E8; 23 black D8; 24 white D7; 25 black C7; 26 white D14; 27 black D13; 28 white F5; 29 black F6; 30 white M8; 31 black M7; 32 white E6; 33 black D6; 34 white E7; 35 black E5; 36 white H5; 37 black J5; 38 white H4; 39 black J4; 40 white H3; 41 black F4; 42 white J6; 43 black H2; 44 white C8; 45 black D9; 46 white J3; 47 black K6; 48 white J7; 49 black K3; 50 white K5; 51 black K4; 52 white H7; 53 black J2; 54 white B11; 55 black B12; 56 white C12; 57 black C13; 58 white B7; 59 black C6; 60 white C9; 61 black B10; 62 white C10; 63 black A11; 64 white B9; 65 black C11; 66 white S14; 67 black D12; 68 white R13; 69 black R15; 70 white Q13; 71 black S12; 72 white S13; 73 black O13; 74 white S16; 75 black Q12; 76 white B4; 77 black S15; 78 white T15; 79 black E18; 80 white M9; 81 black O9; 82 white B6; 83 black B5; 84 white A5; 85 black C4; 86 white B3; 87 black D18; 88 white E17; 89 black G18; 90 white C18; 91 black C15; 92 white B15; 93 black B14; 94 white F17; 95 black G16; 96 white F18; 97 black F19; 98 white H19; 99 black G19.97999890877996891288949574929100021469777893112601665727737068725556670413157571635465050603166162090807646045171080814423221819305825243452483182593332292142478483352820363750768541383951864046494353
Moves 100–199

Go board, 19 by 19. Black stones: F19, G19, D18, E18, G18, M18, G17, L17, F16, G16, L16, O16, Q16, C15, E15, F15, O15, Q15, R15, S15, B14, C14, H14, J14, K14, R14, C13, D13, E13, F13, G13, O13, B12, D12, K12, M12, N12, Q12, R12, S12, A11, C11, E11, H11, N11, B10, E10, G10, N10, D9, E9, O9, D8, H8, L8, N8, S8, C7, M7, Q7, R7, T7, C6, D6, F6, G6, H6, K6, Q6, S6, B5, C5, E5, J5, M5, Q5, C4, D4, E4, F4, J4, K4, M4, N4, E3, G3, K3, M3, F2, H2, J2, N2, T2. White stones: H19, C18, F18, H18, N18, R18, C17, D17, E17, F17, H17, M17, O17, P17, C16, E16, H16, N16, S16, B15, D15, G15, K15, L15, M15, T15, D14, G14, Q14, S14, H13, Q13, R13, S13, G12, H12, D11, G11, J11, M11, C10, F10, K10, M10, R10, B9, C9, F9, M9, N9, C8, E8, F8, K8, M8, B7, D7, E7, H7, J7, K7, B6, E6, J6, R6, A5, F5, G5, H5, K5, N5, R5, S5, B4, H4, L4, P4, Q4, S4, B3, C3, D3, H3, J3, N3, P3, T3, C2, E2, P2, Q2, S2, D1, R1, S1. Moves: 0 white A15; 1 black J16; 2 white J15; 3 black H15; 4 white J17; 5 black L7; 6 white L6; 7 black L9; 8 white L10; 9 black N6; 10 white G7; 11 black G4; 12 white T14; 13 black K16; 14 white K18; 15 black H10; 16 white H9; 17 black M16; 18 white N17; 19 black J9; 20 white K9.140418011317000302121508161920071005060911
Moves 200–220

After move 198, the black AlphaGo proposed resignation, but got rejected by its teammate Gu Li. The white AlphaGo and Lian Xiao finally won by resignation after move 220.

This pair Go game provided a glimpse of how human players might be able to use AI tools in the future, benefiting from the computer's insights while also relying on their own intuition. After the match, David Silver, the lead researcher for AlphaGo said: "Pair Go was a beautiful game. All four players made some brilliant and creative moves. It felt like four painters working together on a shared canvas, all with different styles, all combining together to make something truly beautiful."

=== Team Go ===
Match	Date	Black	White	Time control	Result	Moves
Team Go	26 May 2017	Chen Yaoye/Zhou Ruiyang/Mi Yuting/ Shi Yue/Tang Weixing	AlphaGo	2.5 hours + three 60-second byo-yomi	W+Res	254

The team Go match was held on 26 May afternoon. In this five-on-one match, five world champion players, Chen Yaoye, Zhou Ruiyang, Mi Yuting, Shi Yue, and Tang Weixing (black), joined forces to play against AlphaGo (white). There was a two-and-a-half-hour set time limit for each side followed by three 60-second byo-yomi overtime periods. Consulting each other on every move, the human team approached the challenge in a light-hearted manner, obviously enjoying the experience of playing together. Chosen as the team leader, Zhou Ruiyang positioned the stones on the board during regular time. Tang Weixing put down the stones in overtime, almost working on his own, and finally resigned in the face of AlphaGo’s certain victory. Eric Schmidt, the Executive Chairman of DeepMind's parent company Alphabet, Inc. tweeted: "This speaks volumes about where AI is headed - human players are teaming up with AlphaGo to have even more fun with the game!".

Go board, 19 by 19. Moves: 1 black Q16; 2 white D16; 3 black R4; 4 white D4; 5 black F3; 6 white P3; 7 black C6; 8 white D6; 9 black D7; 10 white E6; 11 black C4; 12 white C3; 13 black C5; 14 white D3; 15 black G4; 16 white Q5; 17 black R5; 18 white Q6; 19 black R7; 20 white J3; 21 black J4; 22 white K4; 23 black K3; 24 white L3; 25 black K2; 26 white H3; 27 black J5; 28 white L2; 29 black G6; 30 white D5; 31 black D8; 32 white F7; 33 black C11; 34 white E10; 35 black D11; 36 white H8; 37 black J8; 38 white H9; 39 black J7; 40 white L4; 41 black K10; 42 white R17; 43 black Q17; 44 white R16; 45 black R14; 46 white R15; 47 black Q15; 48 white S14; 49 black F17; 50 white H17; 51 black F15; 52 white D18; 53 black K17; 54 white H12; 55 black E18; 56 white C15; 57 black H14; 58 white J14; 59 black J15; 60 white J16; 61 black J13; 62 white K16; 63 black K14; 64 white M17; 65 black S13; 66 white R13; 67 black Q14; 68 white S12; 69 black C18; 70 white D19; 71 black D17; 72 white C17; 73 black E17; 74 white B18; 75 black E19; 76 white C19; 77 black K18; 78 white O17; 79 black J19; 80 white N14; 81 black Q13; 82 white T13; 83 black N12; 84 white O13; 85 black R12; 86 white O12; 88 white R11; 89 black Q11; 91 black Q12; 92 white N11; 94 white L15; 95 black S15; 97 black B19; 98 white A19.98977670757974695255777271734950536478434226062144565159944746955758638067454861848166658254838691856833359289883441383136379323919781029181330271617114152122403121452620232462528
First 99 moves (87/93/99 at 65, 90/96 at 66)

Go board, 19 by 19. Black stones: E19, J19, E18, K18, D17, E17, F17, K17, Q17, Q16, F15, J15, Q15, S15, H14, K14, Q14, R14, J13, Q13, S13, N12, Q12, R12, C11, D11, Q11, K10, D8, J8, D7, J7, R7, C6, G6, C5, J5, R5, C4, G4, J4, R4, F3, K3, K2. White stones: A19, C19, D19, B18, D18, C17, H17, M17, O17, R17, D16, J16, K16, R16, C15, L15, R15, N14, S14, O13, T13, H12, O12, S12, N11, R11, E10, H9, H8, F7, D6, E6, Q6, D5, Q5, D4, K4, L4, C3, D3, H3, J3, L3, P3, L2. Moves: 0 white R6; 1 black S6; 2 white R13; 3 black O15; 4 white N15; 6 white S7; 7 black S8; 9 black Q3; 10 white Q2; 12 white Q7; 13 black T7; 15 black P4; 16 white Q4; 17 black R3; 18 white O3; 20 white Q18; 21 black P18; 23 black P2; 24 white O2; 26 white R18; 27 black P17; 29 black F8; 30 white G7; 32 white C7; 33 black T14; 34 white C8; 35 black C9; 36 white B6; 37 black B9; 38 white B7; 39 black Q8; 40 white L12; 41 black P7; 42 white K11; 43 black M11; 44 white M12; 45 black N10; 46 white O11; 47 black D14; 48 white C14; 49 black D13; 50 white P5; 51 black O10; 52 white S16; 53 black Q19; 54 white O18; 55 black P19; 56 white G18; 57 black M18; 58 white L17; 59 black E9; 60 white R2; 61 black S2; 62 white M7; 63 black L8; 64 white P10; 65 black P11; 66 white O8; 67 black N8; 68 white O7; 69 black O5; 70 white O4; 71 black P6; 73 black P8; 74 white O9; 75 black M10; 76 white O6; 77 black P9; 78 white H19; 79 black N18; 80 white L18; 81 black N17; 82 white N16; 83 black O16; 84 white M19; 85 black O19; 86 white S1; 87 black S3; 88 white B12; 89 black G10; 90 white G11; 91 black F11; 92 white F12; 93 black E11; 94 white H10; 95 black M6; 96 white L6; 97 black N7; 98 white N6; 99 black M5. Marks: triangle on black stone at S13.7884855553568057795421202658812782835204034847334902△88924044939190424346658994754551643735597477342963676673390738323062976841120613369695987671000199695070151618091787242310606186
Moves 100–199 (105/111/119/125/131 at,
108/114/122/128 at 102, 172 at 115)

Go board, 19 by 19. Black stones: E19, J19, O19, P19, Q19, E18, K18, M18, N18, P18, D17, E17, F17, K17, N17, P17, Q17, O16, Q16, F15, J15, O15, Q15, S15, D14, H14, K14, Q14, R14, T14, D13, J13, Q13, S13, N12, Q12, R12, C11, D11, E11, F11, M11, P11, Q11, G10, K10, M10, N10, O10, B9, C9, E9, P9, D8, F8, J8, L8, N8, P8, Q8, S8, D7, J7, N7, P7, R7, T7, C6, G6, M6, P6, S6, C5, J5, M5, O5, R5, C4, G4, J4, R4, F3, K3, Q3, R3, S3, K2, P2, S2. White stones: A19, C19, D19, H19, M19, B18, D18, G18, L18, Q18, R18, C17, H17, L17, M17, R17, D16, J16, K16, N16, R16, S16, C15, L15, N15, R15, C14, N14, O13, T13, B12, F12, H12, L12, M12, O12, S12, G11, K11, N11, O11, R11, E10, H10, P10, H9, O9, C8, H8, O8, B7, C7, F7, G7, M7, O7, Q7, B6, D6, E6, L6, N6, O6, Q6, R6, D5, P5, Q5, D4, K4, L4, O4, P4, Q4, C3, D3, H3, J3, L3, O3, P3, L2, O2, Q2, R2, S1. Moves: 0 white N5; 1 black L7; 2 white E2; 3 black F2; 4 white M4; 5 black M8; 6 white K6; 7 black H7; 8 white B11; 9 black F13; 10 white G9; 11 black F10; 12 white B10; 13 black L19; 14 white K19; 15 black E12; 16 white C10; 17 black D10; 18 white A8; 20 white J18; 21 black N19; 22 white J17; 23 black G12; 24 white H11; 25 black A9; 26 white A10; 27 black L11; 28 white K12; 29 black L14; 30 white M14; 31 black F5; 32 white J6; 33 black H6; 34 white H13; 35 black G13; 36 white J2; 37 black D9; 38 white B8; 39 black F1; 40 white N9; 41 black M9; 42 white H4; 43 black H5; 44 white G16; 45 black D15; 46 white E16; 47 black F16; 48 white G15; 49 black G14; 50 white E15; 51 black E14; 52 white C16; 53 black B2; 54 white B4.141321202252464744455048514929300935341523280824272612161711253710414018380507013332063143005442045302033639
Moves 200–254 (219 at 213)

White 54 is a surprising move to human players. After move 58, Ke Jie pointed out that White could play 60, but was teased by other professional players in the research room until AlphaGo actually played this move. Tan Xiao commented that it's difficult for Black to win after move 64.

== Chinese media coverage ==
The game was widely reported by Chinese media and became one of the hottest topics on social networks. However, due to the instruction of the Chinese authorities, the state owned China Central Television cancelled the plan to live telecast the game, and live streaming on a number of Chinese websites was cut off. The only official live broadcast was on YouTube, which is blocked in China. The restrictions caused widespread complaints among Chinese netizens on the social platform Sina Weibo. Chinese media was instructed to play down the mention of Google or Google's products in their reports, as its services are blocked in China.
