= Fan Hui =

Chinese-born French Go player (born 1981)

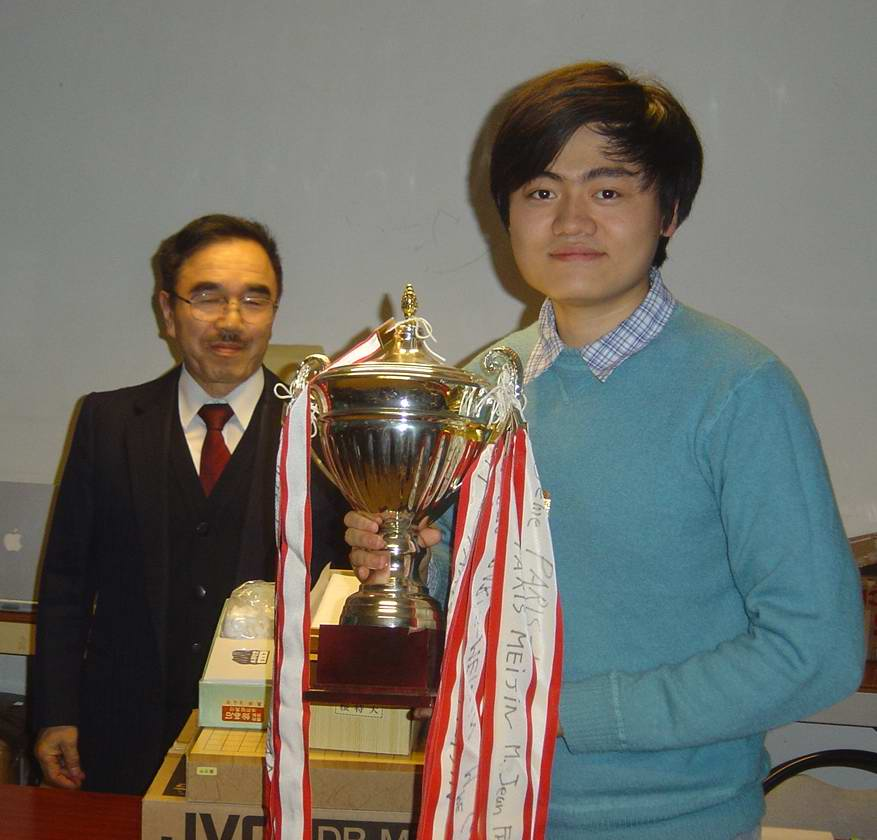
- Fan Hui winning for the 5th time at the Paris Meijin in 2005

Personal information
- Native name: 樊麾 (Chinese); Fán Huī (Pinyin)
- Born: 27 December 1981 (age 44) Xi'an, Shaanxi, China

Sport
- Turned pro: 1996
- Rank: professional 2 dan

Fan Hui (Chinese: 樊麾; pinyin: Fán Huī; born 27 December 1981) is a Chinese-born French Go player. Becoming a professional Go player in 1996, Fan moved to France in 2000 and became the coach of the French national Go team in 2005. He was the winner of the European Go Championship in 2013, 2014 and 2015. As of 2015, he is ranked as a 2 dan professional. He additionally won the 2016 European Professional Go Championship.

== AlphaGo vs Fan Hui ==
In October 2015, Fan was defeated by the Google DeepMind AI program AlphaGo 5–0, the first time an AI has beaten a human professional player at the game without a handicap. Fan described the program as "very strong and stable, it seems like a wall. ... I know AlphaGo is a computer, but if no one told me, maybe I would think the player was a little strange, but a very strong player, a real person."

After his defeat, Fan Hui was hired to advise the AlphaGo team and provided a "sanity check" on Go theory. He served as a judge for the AlphaGo versus Lee Sedol match and observed it in person. He later helped compile commentaries on the matches on AlphaGo's website.

Fan is one of the authors of DeepMind's paper on AlphaGo Zero published in the journal Nature on 19 October 2017.

== Books ==
In 2007, he published his first book in French: The Soul of Go: Shapes and Their Aesthetics, (L'Âme du go. Les formes et leur esthétique) in which he introduces the "fundamentals of Go" as well as the forms and aesthetics unique to the game.

== Publications ==
- L'Âme du go. Les formes et leur esthétique, Éditions Chiron, Paris, 2007, (ISBN 978-2702712030)
- Le go pas à pas. Les premiers pas, livre du maître et de l'élève, volume 1, Chiron, 2010, (ISBN 978-2702713419)
- Le go pas à pas. Deux yeux, volume 2, Chiron, 2010, (ISBN 978-2702713143)
- Le go pas à pas. Les coins, les bords, le centre, volume 3, Chiron, 2010, (ISBN 978-2702713150).
- Le go pas à pas. Quatre formes, volume 4, Chiron, November 2011, (ISBN 978-2702712962)
- Le go pas à pas. Cinq proverbes, volume 5, Chiron, 2013, (ISBN 978-2-7027-1410-2)
