= AlphaGo versus Lee Sedol =

2016 Go match between AI and human

Coordinates: 37.5706°N 126.9754°E

AlphaGo versus Lee Sedol 4–1
Seoul, South Korea, 9–15 March 2016
- Game one: AlphaGo W+R
- Game two: AlphaGo B+R
- Game three: AlphaGo W+R
- Game four: Lee Sedol W+R
- Game five: AlphaGo W+R

AlphaGo versus Lee Sedol, also known as the DeepMind Challenge Match, was a five-game Go match between top Go player Lee Sedol and AlphaGo, a computer Go program developed by DeepMind, played in Seoul, South Korea between the 9th and 15th of March 2016. AlphaGo won all but the fourth game; all games were won by resignation. The match has been compared with the historic chess match between Deep Blue and Garry Kasparov in 1997.

The winner of the match was slated to win $1 million. Since AlphaGo won, Google DeepMind stated that the prize would be donated to charities, including UNICEF, and Go organisations. Lee received $170,000 ($150,000 for participating in the five games and an additional $20,000 for winning one game).

After the match, the Korea Baduk Association awarded AlphaGo the highest Go grandmaster rank – an "honorary 9 dan". It was given in recognition of AlphaGo's "sincere efforts" to master Go. This match was chosen by Science as one of the runners-up for Breakthrough of the Year, on 22 December 2016.

== Background ==
=== Difficult challenge in artificial intelligence ===
External videos
- Machine trains self to beat humans at world's hardest game, Retro Report, 2:51, Retro Report

Go is a complex board game that requires intuition, creative and strategic thinking. It has long been considered a difficult challenge in the field of artificial intelligence (AI). It is considerably more difficult to design strong computer players for than chess. Many in artificial intelligence consider Go to require more elements that mimic human thought than chess. Mathematician I. J. Good wrote in 1965:

Go on a computer? – In order to program a computer to play a reasonable game of Go, rather than merely a legal game – it is necessary to formalise the principles of good strategy, or to design a learning program. The principles are more qualitative and mysterious than in chess, and depend more on judgement. So, I think it will be even more difficult to program a computer to play a reasonable game of Go than of chess.

Prior to 2015, the best Go programs only managed to reach amateur dan level. On the small 9×9 board, the computer fared better, and some programs managed to win a fraction of their 9×9 games against professional players. Before AlphaGo, some researchers had claimed that computers would never defeat top humans at Go. Elon Musk, an early investor of DeepMind, said in 2016 that experts in the field thought AI was 10 years away from achieving a victory against a top professional Go player.

The match AlphaGo versus Lee Sedol is comparable to the 1997 chess match when Garry Kasparov lost to IBM computer Deep Blue. Kasparov's loss to Deep Blue is considered the moment a computer became better than humans at chess.

AlphaGo is significantly different from previous AI efforts. Instead of using probability algorithms hard-coded by human programmers, AlphaGo uses neural networks to estimate its probability of winning. AlphaGo accesses and analyses the entire online library of Go, including all matches, players, analytics, literature, and games played by AlphaGo against itself and other players. Once set up, AlphaGo is independent of the developer team and evaluates the best pathway to solving Go (i.e., winning the game). By using neural networks and Monte Carlo tree search, AlphaGo calculates colossal numbers of likely and unlikely probabilities many moves into the future.

Related research results are being applied to fields such as cognitive science, pattern recognition and machine learning.

=== Previous victory against Fan Hui ===
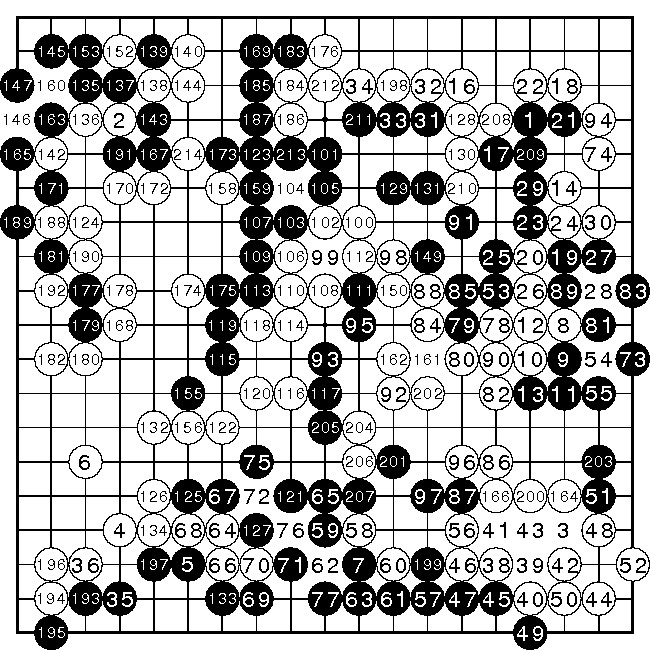
Fan Hui vs AlphaGo – Game 5

AlphaGo defeated European champion Fan Hui, a 2 dan professional, 5–0 in October 2015, the first time an AI had beaten a human professional player at the game on a full-sized board without a handicap. Some commentators stressed the gulf between Fan and the much higher-ranked Lee, a 9 dan professional. Computer programs Zen and Crazy Stone had previously defeated 9 dan professional players only with large handicaps of four or five stones. Canadian AI specialist Jonathan Schaeffer, commenting after the win against Fan, compared AlphaGo with a "child prodigy" that lacked experience, and judged that "the real achievement will be when the program plays a player in the true top echelon." He believed that Lee would win the match in March 2016.

In the aftermath of his match against AlphaGo, Fan Hui noted that the game had taught him to be a better player and to see things he had not previously seen. By March 2016, Wired reported that his ranking had risen from 633 in the world to around 300.

=== Preparation ===
Go experts found errors in AlphaGo's play against Fan, particularly relating to a lack of awareness of the entire board. Before the game against Lee, it was unknown how much the program had improved its game since its October match. AlphaGo's original training dataset started with games of strong amateur players from internet Go servers, after which AlphaGo trained by playing against itself for tens of millions of games.

Hajin Lee, a professional Go player and the International Go Federation's secretary-general, commented that she was "very excited" at the prospect of an AI challenging Lee, and thought the two players had an equal chance of winning.

== Players ==
=== AlphaGo ===
AlphaGo logo

AlphaGo is a computer program developed by Google DeepMind to play the board game Go. AlphaGo's algorithm uses a combination of machine learning and tree search techniques, combined with extensive training, both from human and computer play. The system's neural networks were initially bootstrapped from human game-play expertise. AlphaGo was initially trained to mimic human play by attempting to match the moves of expert players from recorded historical games, using a KGS Go Server database of around 30 million moves from 160,000 games by KGS 6 to 9 dan human players. Once it had reached a certain degree of proficiency, it was trained further by being set to play large numbers of games against other instances of itself, using reinforcement learning to improve its play. The system does not use a "database" of moves to play. As one of the creators of AlphaGo explained:

Although we have programmed this machine to play, we have no idea what moves it will come up with. Its moves are an emergent phenomenon from the training. We just create the data sets and the training algorithms. But the moves it then comes up with are out of our hands—and much better than we, as Go players, could come up with.

In the match against Lee, AlphaGo used about the same computing power as it had in the match against Fan Hui, where it used 1,202 CPUs and 176 GPUs. The Economist reported that it used 1,920 CPUs and 280 GPUs. Google has also stated that its proprietary tensor processing units were used in the match against Lee Sedol.

=== Lee Sedol ===
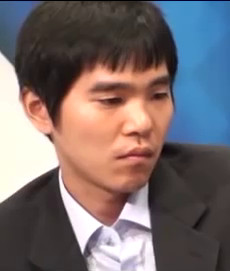
Lee Sedol in 2012

Lee Sedol is a professional Go player of 9 dan rank and is one of the strongest players in the history of Go. He started his career in 1996 (promoted to professional dan rank at the age of 12), winning 18 international titles since then. He is a "national hero" in his native South Korea, known for his unconventional and creative play. Lee Sedol initially predicted he would defeat AlphaGo in a "landslide". Some weeks before the match he won the Korean Myungin title, a major championship, and he celebrated his 33rd birthday shortly before the match.

== Games ==
The match was to have five games, with a grand prize of one million US dollars, using Chinese rules with a 7.5-point komi. For each game there was a two-hour set time limit for each player, followed by three 60-second byo-yomi overtime periods. Each game started at 13:00 KST (04:00 GMT).

The match was played at the Four Seasons Hotel in Seoul, South Korea in March 2016 and was video-streamed live with commentary; the English language commentary was done by Michael Redmond (9-dan professional) and Chris Garlock. Aja Huang, a DeepMind team member and amateur 6-dan Go player, placed stones on the Go board for AlphaGo, which ran through the Google Cloud Platform with its server located in the United States.

=== Summary ===
Game	Date	Black	White	Result	Moves
1	9 March 2016	Lee Sedol	AlphaGo	Lee Sedol resigned	186 Game 1
2	10 March 2016	AlphaGo	Lee Sedol	Lee Sedol resigned	211 Game 2
3	12 March 2016	Lee Sedol	AlphaGo	Lee Sedol resigned	176 Game 3
4	13 March 2016	AlphaGo	Lee Sedol	AlphaGo resigned	180 Game 4
5	15 March 2016	Lee Sedol^{[note 1]}	AlphaGo	Lee Sedol resigned	280 Game 5
Result: AlphaGo 4 – 1 Lee Sedol
note 1: For Game Five, under the official rules, it was intended that the colour assignments would be done at random. However, during the press conference after the fourth match, Lee requested "... since I won with white, I really do hope that in the fifth match I could win with black because winning with black is much more valuable." Hassabis agreed to allow Sedol to play with black.

=== Game 1 ===
AlphaGo (white) won the first game. Lee appeared to be in control throughout the match, but AlphaGo gained the advantage in the final 20 minutes, and Lee resigned. Lee stated afterwards that he had made a critical error at the beginning of the match; he said that the computer's strategy in the early part of the game was "excellent" and that the AI had made one unusual move that no human Go player would have made. David Ormerod, commenting on the game at Go Game Guru, described Lee's seventh stone as "a strange move to test AlphaGo's strength in the opening", characterising the move as a mistake and AlphaGo's response as "accurate and efficient". He described AlphaGo's position as favourable in the first part of the game, considering that Lee started to come back with move 81 before making "questionable" moves at 119 and 123, followed by a "losing" move at 129. Professional Go player Cho Hanseung commented that AlphaGo's game had greatly improved from when it beat Fan Hui in October 2015. Michael Redmond described the computer's game as being more aggressive than against Fan.

According to 9-dan Go grandmaster Kim Seong-ryong, Lee seemed stunned by AlphaGo's strong play on the 102nd stone. After watching AlphaGo make the game's 102nd move, Lee mulled over his options for more than 10 minutes.

Go board, 19 by 19. Moves: 1 black R16; 2 white D16; 3 black Q3; 4 white D4; 5 black F17; 6 white C14; 7 black R8; 8 white P16; 9 black M16; 10 white R17; 11 black S17; 12 white Q17; 13 black S15; 14 white P14; 15 black Q13; 16 white P13; 17 black Q12; 18 white J16; 19 black M14; 20 white P12; 21 black Q11; 22 white M12; 23 black L12; 24 white L15; 25 black M15; 26 white M13; 27 black L13; 28 white L14; 29 black O15; 30 white P15; 31 black K17; 32 white J17; 33 black K16; 34 white J15; 35 black K15; 36 white K14; 37 black J14; 38 white K13; 39 black M11; 40 white N11; 41 black H14; 42 white J12; 43 black N18; 44 white G16; 45 black L11; 46 white N10; 47 black L9; 48 white J18; 49 black P18; 50 white N8; 51 black M7; 52 white O17; 53 black O18; 54 white L18; 55 black M17; 56 white N7; 57 black M6; 58 white L8; 59 black M8; 60 white M9; 61 black K10; 62 white K8; 63 black H10; 64 white H11; 65 black G10; 66 white G14; 67 black J11; 68 white K12; 69 black J10; 70 white N6; 71 black M5; 72 white N5; 73 black M4; 74 white N4; 75 black M3; 76 white N3; 77 black J7; 78 white R5; 79 black F3; 80 white G13; 81 black C6; 82 white D6; 83 black D7; 84 white F4; 85 black G4; 86 white G3; 87 black F2; 88 white C5; 89 black E6; 90 white D5; 91 black E4; 92 white C7; 93 black D8; 94 white M2; 95 black L2; 96 white S18; 97 black K18; 98 white K19; 99 black N14.984897544353499653231555212101124418339813435242529301366641373628199914803827261615426823222017646745394021656369614647609362585950792837751568182895770889071727849184857374798675763879594
First 99 moves

Go board, 19 by 19. Black stones: K18, N18, O18, P18, F17, K17, M17, S17, K16, M16, R16, K15, M15, O15, S15, H14, J14, M14, N14, L13, Q13, L12, Q12, J11, L11, M11, Q11, G10, H10, J10, K10, L9, D8, M8, R8, D7, J7, M7, C6, E6, M6, M5, E4, G4, M4, F3, M3, Q3, F2, L2. White stones: K19, J18, L18, S18, J17, O17, Q17, R17, D16, G16, J16, P16, J15, L15, P15, C14, G14, K14, L14, P14, G13, K13, M13, P13, J12, K12, M12, P12, H11, N11, N10, M9, K8, L8, N8, C7, N7, D6, N6, C5, D5, N5, R5, D4, F4, N4, G3, N3, M2. Moves: 0 white N12; 1 black O16; 2 white R10; 3 black Q10; 4 white R9; 5 black Q8; 6 white Q9; 7 black P9; 8 white S12; 9 black S8; 10 white R14; 11 black S11; 12 white S14; 13 black Q14; 14 white R15; 15 black R12; 16 white C17; 17 black B6; 18 white B7; 19 black B8; 20 white B5; 21 black S13; 22 white N2; 23 black Q5; 24 white K2; 25 black L3; 26 white Q6; 27 black P5; 28 white R4; 29 black P6; 30 white Q4; 31 black P4; 32 white R3; 33 black P2; 34 white Q2; 35 black P3; 36 white Q16; 37 black R2; 38 white S2; 39 black Q1; 40 white S1; 41 black S6; 42 white S5; 43 black R6; 44 white T5; 45 black C8; 46 white A6; 47 black L1; 48 white P7; 49 black P8; 50 white C11; 51 black H12; 52 white H13; 53 black D2; 54 white D10; 55 black B3; 56 white C3; 57 black C2; 58 white B4; 59 black D3; 60 white B2; 61 black C4; 62 white A4; 63 black E9; 64 white F11; 65 black B10; 66 white B11; 67 black Q18; 68 white R18; 69 black T14; 70 white S16; 71 black A11; 72 white A12; 73 black A10; 74 white B12; 75 black G11; 76 white F10; 77 black F9; 78 white P17; 79 black N17; 80 white O7; 81 black Q7; 82 white C10; 83 black A8; 84 white A3; 85 black G12; 86 white F12.676816797801367014131012695221727486855100150871665064751173658254760302637707060483194549050918804881461729264341202723424462586131302884555659253532605753242233343738473940
Moves 100–186

=== Game 2 ===
AlphaGo (black) won the second game. Lee stated afterwards that "AlphaGo played a nearly perfect game", "from very beginning of the game I did not feel like there was a point that I was leading". One of the creators of AlphaGo, Demis Hassabis, said that the system was confident of victory from the midway point of the game, even though the professional commentators could not tell which player was ahead.

Michael Redmond (9p) noted that AlphaGo's 19th stone (move 37) was "creative" and "unique". It was a move that most professional players would not have considered. Lee took an unusually long time to respond. An Younggil (8p) called AlphaGo's move 37 "a rare and intriguing shoulder hit" but said Lee's counter was "exquisite". He stated that control passed between the players several times before the endgame, and especially praised AlphaGo's moves 151, 157, and 159, calling them "brilliant".

AlphaGo showed anomalies and moves from a broader perspective, which professional Go players described as looking like mistakes at first sight but an intentional strategy in hindsight. As one of the creators of the system explained, AlphaGo does not attempt to maximize its points or its margin of victory, but tries to maximize its probability of winning. If AlphaGo must choose between a scenario where it will win by 20 points with 80 percent probability and another where it will win by 1½ points with 99 percent probability, it will choose the latter, pursuing overall victory over points. In particular, move 167 by AlphaGo seemed to give Lee a fighting chance and was declared to look like a blatant mistake by commentators. An Younggil said, "So when AlphaGo plays a slack looking move, we may regard it as a mistake, but perhaps it should more accurately be viewed as a declaration of victory?"

Go board, 19 by 19. Moves: 1 black Q16; 2 white D4; 3 black C16; 4 white R4; 5 black P4; 6 white P3; 7 black O3; 8 white Q3; 9 black C6; 10 white F3; 11 black N4; 12 white R6; 13 black J17; 14 white D10; 15 black Q5; 16 white R5; 17 black C4; 18 white C3; 19 black B3; 20 white C5; 21 black B4; 22 white B5; 23 black D5; 24 white B6; 25 black D3; 26 white E4; 27 black D2; 28 white C7; 29 black K4; 30 white C13; 31 black E16; 32 white R14; 33 black R15; 34 white Q14; 35 black O16; 36 white Q11; 37 black P10; 38 white P11; 39 black O10; 40 white N12; 41 black G4; 42 white G3; 43 black D6; 44 white D7; 45 black F5; 46 white H4; 47 black H5; 48 white E5; 49 black E6; 50 white F6; 51 black E7; 52 white E8; 53 black F7; 54 white G6; 55 black F8; 56 white G5; 57 black E9; 58 white D9; 59 black D8; 60 white C8; 61 black E12; 62 white D11; 63 black Q10; 64 white R11; 65 black S14; 66 white S13; 67 black L16; 68 white H6; 69 black P7; 70 white S15; 71 black S16; 72 white T14; 73 black F11; 74 white G9; 75 black H7; 76 white J6; 77 black H8; 78 white L5; 79 black L4; 80 white G17; 81 black D14; 82 white J16; 83 black K17; 84 white G15; 85 black D13; 86 white C14; 87 black C12; 88 white B12; 89 black D12; 90 white B11; 91 black H16; 92 white H15; 93 black G16; 94 white F16; 95 black H17; 96 white F15; 97 black E17; 98 white G12; 99 black F17.979980951383331949391826735171968492337086813432657230856688878961984090627338366414393763585774605952557728445153756924943495054687612222023484556477815162117226414629791154191825104276827
First 99 moves

Go board, 19 by 19. Black stones: E17, F17, H17, J17, K17, C16, E16, G16, H16, L16, O16, Q16, S16, R15, D14, D13, C12, D12, E12, F11, O10, P10, Q10, E9, D8, F8, H8, E7, F7, H7, P7, C6, D6, E6, D5, F5, H5, Q5, B4, C4, G4, K4, L4, N4, P4, B3, D3, O3, D2. White stones: G17, F16, J16, F15, G15, H15, S15, C14, Q14, R14, T14, C13, S13, B12, G12, N12, B11, D11, P11, Q11, R11, D10, D9, G9, C8, C7, D7, B6, F6, G6, H6, J6, R6, B5, C5, E5, G5, L5, R5, D4, E4, H4, R4, C3, F3, G3, P3, Q3. Moves: 0 white G11; 1 black J11; 2 white H9; 3 black J9; 4 white J8; 5 black J7; 6 white J10; 7 black K8; 8 white K10; 9 black J14; 10 white L7; 11 black L8; 12 white M10; 13 black M9; 14 white M5; 15 black M11; 16 white L10; 17 black C11; 18 white C10; 19 black N10; 20 white O2; 21 black N2; 22 white M3; 23 black M4; 24 white N3; 25 black O4; 26 white M2; 27 black M7; 28 white L12; 29 black H13; 30 white R17; 31 black R16; 32 white S17; 33 black Q17; 34 white T16; 35 black G13; 36 white C15; 37 black B16; 38 white R18; 39 black H11; 40 white K13; 41 black H10; 42 white P18; 43 black Q18; 44 white Q19; 45 black O18; 46 white D15; 47 black E15; 48 white G10; 49 black H12; 50 white E10; 51 black O14; 52 white N14; 53 black N15; 54 white S9; 55 black F12; 56 white E8; 57 black O12; 58 white O13; 59 black M13; 60 white M12; 61 black N13; 62 white P13; 63 black L13; 64 white O11; 65 black K12; 66 white O19; 67 black L11; 68 white N11; 69 black K11; 70 white O17; 71 black N18; 72 white P16; 73 black N17; 74 white P17; 75 black L2; 76 white N1; 77 black J5; 78 white J4; 79 black K5; 80 white K6; 81 black J2; 82 white H2; 83 black R8; 84 white S8; 85 black R7; 86 white S7; 87 black A5; 88 white B7; 89 black M6; 90 white L6; 91 black N5; 92 white B15; 93 black A15; 94 white A14; 95 black A16; 96 white N19; 97 black M19; 98 white P19; 99 black D16.97966698447145424338737074333032953799723134939236464753940952513529406359615862554965286057170039016967156864185048410608161219020313545604071183848805102785868090898777791491782325222482817526212076
Moves 100–199

Go board, 19 by 19. Black stones: M19, N18, O18, Q18, E17, F17, H17, J17, K17, N17, Q17, A16, B16, C16, D16, E16, G16, H16, L16, O16, Q16, R16, S16, A15, E15, N15, R15, D14, J14, O14, D13, G13, H13, L13, M13, N13, C12, D12, E12, F12, H12, K12, O12, C11, F11, H11, J11, K11, L11, M11, H10, N10, O10, P10, Q10, E9, J9, M9, F8, H8, K8, L8, R8, E7, F7, H7, J7, M7, P7, R7, C6, D6, E6, M6, A5, D5, F5, H5, J5, K5, N5, Q5, B4, C4, G4, K4, L4, M4, N4, O4, P4, B3, D3, O3, D2, J2, L2. White stones: N19, O19, P19, Q19, P18, R18, G17, O17, P17, R17, S17, F16, J16, P16, T16, B15, C15, D15, F15, G15, H15, S15, A14, C14, N14, Q14, R14, T14, C13, K13, O13, P13, S13, B12, G12, L12, M12, N12, B11, D11, G11, N11, O11, P11, Q11, R11, C10, D10, E10, G10, J10, K10, L10, M10, D9, G9, H9, S9, C8, E8, S8, B7, C7, D7, L7, S7, B6, F6, G6, H6, J6, K6, L6, R6, B5, C5, E5, G5, L5, M5, R5, D4, E4, H4, J4, R4, C3, F3, G3, M3, N3, P3, Q3, H2, M2, O2, N1. Moves: 0 white B13; 1 black M18; 2 white Q6; 3 black P6; 4 white E2; 5 black C2; 6 white F4; 7 black J3; 8 white H3; 9 black R10; 10 white S10; 11 black L1.010009100302060807050411
Moves 200–211

=== Game 3 ===
AlphaGo (white) won the third game.

After the second game, players still had doubts about whether AlphaGo was truly a strong player in the sense that a human might be. The third game was described as removing that doubt, with analysts commenting that:

AlphaGo won so convincingly as to remove all doubt about its strength from the minds of experienced players. In fact, it played so well that it was almost scary ... In forcing AlphaGo to withstand a very severe, one-sided attack, Lee revealed its hitherto undetected power ... Lee wasn't gaining enough profit from his attack ... One of the greatest virtuosos of the middle game had just been upstaged in black and white clarity.

According to An Younggil (8p) and David Ormerod, the game showed that "AlphaGo is simply stronger than any known human Go player." AlphaGo was seen to capably navigate tricky situations known as ko that did not come up in the previous two matches. An and Ormerod consider move 148 to be particularly notable: in the middle of a complex ko fight, AlphaGo displayed sufficient "confidence" that it was winning the game to play a significant move elsewhere.

Lee, playing black, opened with a High Chinese formation and generated a large area of black influence, which AlphaGo invaded at move 12. This required the program to defend a weak group, which it did successfully. An Younggil described Lee's move 31 as possibly the "losing move" and Andy Jackson of the American Go Association considered that the outcome had already been decided by move 35. AlphaGo had gained control of the game by move 48, and forced Lee onto the defensive. Lee counterattacked at moves 77/79, but AlphaGo's response was effective, and its move 90 succeeded in simplifying the position. It then gained a large area of control at the bottom of the board, strengthening its position with moves from 102 to 112 described by An as "sophisticated". Lee attacked again at moves 115 and 125, but AlphaGo's responses were again effective. Lee eventually attempted a complex ko from move 131 without forcing an error from the program, and he resigned at move 176.

Go board, 19 by 19. Moves: 1 black Q16; 2 white Q4; 3 black C16; 4 white D4; 5 black C6; 6 white F3; 7 black J16; 8 white R14; 9 black O17; 10 white R7; 11 black D10; 12 white E16; 13 black D17; 14 white E13; 15 black E14; 16 white D15; 17 black D14; 18 white C15; 19 black E17; 20 white F16; 21 black F14; 22 white F17; 23 black B16; 24 white H15; 25 black J15; 26 white H16; 27 black J17; 28 white H13; 29 black J14; 30 white G13; 31 black K12; 32 white C11; 33 black D13; 34 white D11; 35 black E11; 36 white B13; 37 black B12; 38 white B15; 39 black B11; 40 white C10; 41 black D12; 42 white D9; 43 black E10; 44 white C9; 45 black C12; 46 white G11; 47 black F12; 48 white D7; 49 black D6; 50 white F13; 51 black E12; 52 white F7; 53 black E9; 54 white E8; 55 black G9; 56 white J11; 57 black C7; 58 white F5; 59 black E6; 60 white F8; 61 black B9; 62 white B10; 63 black A10; 64 white H7; 65 black H10; 66 white H11; 67 black G10; 68 white K11; 69 black J8; 70 white K6; 71 black C4; 72 white C3; 73 black D3; 74 white D2; 75 black B3; 76 white E3; 77 black Q7; 78 white Q8; 79 black R6; 80 white P7; 81 black Q6; 82 white R8; 83 black P8; 84 white P6; 85 black S6; 86 white P5; 87 black P9; 88 white R11; 89 black M8; 90 white H17; 91 black R3; 92 white R4; 93 black S4; 94 white Q3; 95 black S3; 96 white R2; 97 black S2; 98 white M6; 99 black R15.131922902792331220267138181624259917152129836331450302837454151473139323435466656688863624011436765614442535587546069898378825748526480771054959709884817985588671429293757273766949195749697
First 99 moves

Go board, 19 by 19. Black stones: D17, E17, J17, O17, B16, C16, J16, Q16, J15, R15, D14, E14, F14, J14, D13, B12, C12, D12, E12, F12, K12, B11, E11, A10, D10, E10, G10, H10, B9, E9, G9, P9, J8, M8, P8, C7, Q7, C6, D6, E6, Q6, R6, S6, C4, S4, B3, R3, S3, S2. White stones: F17, H17, E16, F16, H16, B15, C15, D15, H15, R14, B13, E13, F13, G13, H13, C11, D11, G11, H11, J11, K11, R11, B10, C10, C9, D9, E8, F8, Q8, R8, D7, F7, H7, P7, R7, K6, M6, P6, F5, P5, D4, Q4, R4, C3, E3, F3, Q3, D2, R2. Moves: 0 white S15; 1 black S16; 2 white Q15; 3 black R16; 4 white B18; 5 black D16; 6 white E15; 7 black C18; 8 white B17; 9 black A16; 10 white E18; 11 black B19; 12 white G18; 13 black R9; 14 white Q9; 15 black M5; 16 white N6; 17 black Q10; 18 white R10; 19 black S8; 20 white S9; 21 black S7; 23 black C2; 24 white Q14; 25 black J3; 26 white L3; 27 black M3; 28 white K3; 29 black K5; 30 white L6; 31 black H2; 32 white J4; 33 black H4; 34 white J5; 35 black K2; 36 white L2; 37 black H5; 38 white G3; 39 black H3; 40 white J6; 41 black F6; 42 white G6; 43 black G5; 44 white G2; 45 black G1; 46 white F1; 47 black J1; 48 white J18; 49 black L1; 50 white M2; 51 black D3; 52 white H6; 53 black D1; 55 black F4; 56 white E5; 57 black D5; 58 white E4; 59 black E2; 60 white H1; 61 black R12; 62 white Q12; 65 black B2; 67 black Q11; 68 white P12; 70 white B4; 72 white C5; 73 black B5; 74 white B6; 76 white C1. Marks: triangle on black stone at C4; triangle on white stone at C3.11040710124808090503010602002468626167171814132019217441425240301673725756433734291570△58553332△51383925282627652359443135365076534645604749
Moves 100–176 (122 at 113,
154 at, 163 at 145, 164 at 151,
166 and 171 at 160, 169 at 145, 175 at)

=== Game 4 ===
After losing the previous three games, Lee (white) won the fourth. Lee played a type of bold strategy known as amashi, in response to AlphaGo's apparent preference for Souba Go, which attempts to win by many small gains when the opportunity arises and by taking territory at the perimeter rather than the center. Lee's apparent aim was to force an "all or nothing" situation which might neutralize AlphaGo's virtuosity in negotiating slim back-and-forth advantages.

The first 11 moves were identical to the second game, where Lee also played white. In the early game, Lee concentrated on taking territory in the edges and corners of the board, allowing AlphaGo to gain influence in the top and centre. Lee then invaded AlphaGo's region of influence at the top with moves 40 to 48, following the amashi strategy. AlphaGo responded with a shoulder hit at move 47, sacrificing four stones elsewhere and gaining the initiative with moves 47 to 53 and 69. Lee tested AlphaGo with moves 72 to 76 without provoking an error, and by this point in the game, commentators had begun to feel Lee's play was a lost cause. However, an unexpected play at white 78, described as "a brilliant tesuji", turned the game around. The move developed a white wedge at the centre, and increased the game's complexity. Gu Li (9p) described it as a "divine move" and stated that the move had been completely unforeseen by him. Move 78 broke new ground as a radical change to playing convention.

AlphaGo responded poorly on move 79, at which time it estimated it had a 70% chance to win the game. Lee followed up with a strong move at white 82. AlphaGo's initial response in moves 83 to 85 was appropriate, but at move 87, its estimate of its chances to win suddenly plummeted, provoking it to make a series of very bad moves from black 87 to 101. David Ormerod characterised moves 87 to 101 as typical of Monte Carlo-based program mistakes. Lee took the lead by white 92, and An Younggil described black 105 as the final losing move. Despite good tactics during moves 131 to 141, AlphaGo could not recover during the endgame and resigned. AlphaGo's resignation was triggered when it evaluated its chance of winning to be less than 20%; this is intended to match the decision of professionals who resign rather than play to the end when their position is felt to be irrecoverable.

An Younggil at Go Game Guru concluded that the game was "a masterpiece for Lee Sedol and will almost certainly become a famous game in the history of Go". Lee commented after the match that he considered AlphaGo was strongest when playing white (second). For this reason, he requested that he play black in the fifth game, which is considered more risky.

David Ormerod of Go Game Guru stated that although an analysis of AlphaGo's play around 79–87 was not yet available, he believed it resulted from a known weakness in play algorithms that use Monte Carlo tree search. In essence, the search attempts to prune less relevant sequences. In some cases, a play can lead to a particular line of play which is significant but which is overlooked when the tree is pruned, and this outcome is therefore "off the search radar".

Go board, 19 by 19. Moves: 1 black Q16; 2 white D4; 3 black C16; 4 white R4; 5 black P4; 6 white P3; 7 black O3; 8 white Q3; 9 black C6; 10 white F3; 11 black N4; 12 white Q5; 13 black J3; 14 white E17; 15 black H16; 16 white C13; 17 black E16; 18 white C10; 19 black D17; 20 white B4; 21 black O17; 22 white R11; 23 black E4; 24 white E5; 25 black D9; 26 white F4; 27 black C9; 28 white D10; 29 black E10; 30 white E11; 31 black F11; 32 white E12; 33 black F12; 34 white B10; 35 black F9; 36 white F13; 37 black G13; 38 white F14; 39 black G14; 40 white N17; 41 black N16; 42 white M17; 43 black O18; 44 white J16; 45 black H17; 46 white K13; 47 black Q10; 48 white Q11; 49 black P10; 50 white P11; 51 black O11; 52 white O12; 53 black N12; 54 white O13; 55 black N13; 56 white N11; 57 black O10; 58 white N14; 59 black M11; 60 white O15; 61 black O16; 62 white N10; 63 black M14; 64 white N9; 65 black N15; 66 white O14; 67 black M12; 68 white R10; 69 black L9; 70 white J9; 71 black K11; 72 white G12; 73 black H10; 74 white G15; 75 black H15; 76 white F16; 77 black F17; 78 white L11; 79 black K10; 80 white M10; 81 black L12; 82 white K12; 83 black N8; 84 white O9; 85 black P8; 86 white P9; 87 black Q9; 88 white Q8; 89 black R9; 90 white O8; 91 black L10; 92 white J11; 93 black S9; 94 white P7; 95 black Q13; 96 white R8; 97 black C4; 98 white C5; 99 black P15.431914774542402131776154441611747565609938396358661636374655549532337282816753523031927178595651504822341828297379918062574947682725357069648486878993839085889694998241220972232611541013768
First 99 moves

Go board, 19 by 19. Black stones: O18, D17, F17, H17, O17, C16, E16, H16, N16, O16, Q16, H15, N15, P15, G14, M14, G13, N13, Q13, F12, L12, M12, N12, F11, K11, M11, O11, E10, H10, K10, L10, O10, P10, Q10, C9, D9, F9, L9, Q9, R9, S9, N8, C6, C4, E4, N4, P4, J3, O3. White stones: E17, M17, N17, F16, J16, G15, O15, F14, N14, O14, C13, F13, K13, O13, E12, G12, K12, O12, E11, J11, N11, P11, Q11, R11, B10, C10, D10, M10, N10, R10, J9, N9, O9, P9, O8, Q8, R8, P7, C5, E5, Q5, B4, D4, F4, R4, F3, P3, Q3. Moves: 0 white S8; 1 black T9; 2 white S10; 3 black H13; 4 white J10; 5 black L7; 6 white G11; 7 black F10; 8 white K8; 9 black L8; 10 white G8; 11 black F8; 12 white G7; 13 black C12; 14 white E15; 15 black E18; 16 white B13; 17 black D13; 18 white E13; 19 black E6; 20 white F5; 21 black D14; 22 white D12; 23 black J7; 24 white H9; 25 black B6; 26 white J14; 27 black G16; 28 white F15; 29 black H14; 30 white J12; 31 black B12; 32 white C11; 33 black H5; 34 white G5; 35 black P2; 36 white S13; 37 black D6; 38 white C3; 39 black Q2; 40 white R2; 41 black S14; 42 white R13; 43 black R14; 44 white K17; 45 black G2; 46 white T14; 47 black T15; 48 white T13; 49 black S16; 50 white B8; 51 black B9; 52 white A9; 53 black C8; 54 white H6; 55 black J6; 56 white H4; 57 black F2; 58 white E2; 59 black E1; 60 white D1; 61 black A12; 62 white A11; 63 black L16; 64 white J15; 65 black L17; 66 white L18; 67 black G9; 68 white J18; 69 black R12; 70 white S12; 71 black R1; 72 white S1; 73 black P12; 74 white T8; 75 black P14; 76 white T10; 79 black P5; 80 white K4. Marks: square on black stone at O11; triangle on black stone at O10.156866446527634914286447212926754341461617180342364861311322307369706232060704△02765251672401505311100809007412230525371954552034337956803858574535394060597172
Moves 100–180 (177 at, 178 at)

=== Game 5 ===
AlphaGo (white) won the fifth game. The game was described as being close. Hassabis stated that the result came after the program made a "bad mistake" early in the game.

Lee, playing black, opened similarly to the first game and began to stake out territory in the right and top left corners – a similar strategy to the one he employed successfully in game 4 – while AlphaGo gained influence in the centre of the board. The game remained even until white moves 48 to 58, which AlphaGo played in the bottom right. These moves unnecessarily lost ko threats and aji, allowing Lee to take the lead. Michael Redmond (9p) speculated that perhaps AlphaGo had missed black's "tombstone squeeze" tesuji. Humans are taught to recognize the specific pattern, but it is a long sequence of moves, made difficult if computed from scratch.

AlphaGo then started to develop the top of the board and the centre and defended successfully against an attack by Lee in moves 69 to 81 that David Ormerod characterised as over-cautious. By white 90, AlphaGo had regained equality and then played a series of moves described by Ormerod as "unusual... but subtly impressive", which gained a slight advantage. Lee tried a Hail Mary pass with moves 167 and 169, but AlphaGo's defence was successful. An Younggil noted white moves 154, 186, and 194 as being particularly strong, and the program played an impeccable endgame, maintaining its lead until Lee resigned.

Go board, 19 by 19. Moves: 1 black R16; 2 white D16; 3 black Q3; 4 white D4; 5 black P17; 6 white Q5; 7 black R5; 8 white R6; 9 black R4; 10 white Q7; 11 black O3; 12 white R15; 13 black Q15; 14 white R14; 15 black S16; 16 white Q14; 17 black R8; 18 white P15; 19 black Q8; 20 white P8; 21 black P7; 22 white P9; 23 black O7; 24 white R10; 25 black S6; 26 white G3; 27 black C14; 28 white F17; 29 black B16; 30 white C12; 31 black D12; 32 white D11; 33 black D13; 34 white C17; 35 black C11; 36 white C10; 37 black B11; 38 white D10; 39 black B12; 40 white N8; 41 black N7; 42 white M7; 43 black O8; 44 white O9; 45 black M6; 46 white M8; 47 black L6; 48 white N6; 49 black N5; 50 white S7; 51 black S8; 52 white S5; 53 black T6; 54 white Q6; 55 black P5; 56 white P4; 57 black O5; 58 white T7; 59 black Q4; 60 white O17; 61 black O18; 62 white P18; 63 black Q18; 64 white P16; 65 black Q17; 66 white N18; 67 black P19; 68 white N17; 69 black G16; 70 white G14; 71 black G17; 72 white F16; 73 black G15; 74 white F14; 75 black H14; 76 white H13; 77 black J14; 78 white J13; 79 black J16; 80 white K14; 81 black K18; 82 white K16; 83 black K17; 84 white K15; 85 black G12; 86 white F18; 87 black G13; 88 white F15; 89 black H17; 90 white H11; 91 black K8; 92 white H18; 93 black G18; 94 white G19; 95 black J18; 96 white H19; 97 black J19; 98 white F19; 99 black L19.989496979967869392958166616263342871898368605652927269798264115887384181312277470757780161433877678393031853735329036382444229146404320191751424123211050584745485482553495755675245659926113
First 99 moves

Go board, 19 by 19. Black stones: J19, L19, P19, G18, J18, K18, O18, Q18, G17, H17, K17, P17, Q17, B16, G16, J16, R16, S16, G15, Q15, C14, H14, J14, D13, G13, B12, D12, G12, B11, C11, K8, O8, Q8, R8, S8, N7, O7, P7, L6, M6, S6, T6, N5, O5, P5, R5, Q4, R4, O3, Q3. White stones: F19, G19, H19, F18, H18, N18, C17, F17, N17, O17, D16, F16, K16, P16, F15, K15, P15, R15, F14, G14, K14, Q14, R14, H13, J13, C12, D11, H11, C10, D10, R10, O9, P9, M8, N8, P8, M7, Q7, S7, T7, N6, Q6, R6, Q5, S5, D4, P4, G3. Moves: 0 white J3; 1 black J11; 2 white H12; 3 black H10; 4 white G11; 5 black G10; 6 white C6; 7 black D3; 8 white C3; 9 black F3; 10 white E3; 11 black F4; 12 white G4; 13 black D5; 14 white C5; 15 black E4; 16 white D2; 17 black E2; 19 black G2; 20 white F5; 21 black E5; 22 white F6; 23 black H2; 24 white J6; 25 black J2; 26 white K3; 27 black L2; 28 white K2; 29 black K1; 30 white L3; 31 black M2; 32 white M3; 33 black N3; 34 white N2; 35 black O2; 36 white J9; 37 black F11; 38 white F12; 39 black K9; 40 white J10; 41 black K10; 42 white J8; 43 black K7; 44 white J7; 45 black E12; 46 white F13; 47 black N10; 48 white M10; 49 black M11; 50 white N11; 51 black M9; 52 white O10; 53 black L10; 54 white E11; 55 black B9; 56 white B10; 57 black A10; 58 white J1; 59 black H1; 60 white T5; 62 white S9; 63 black T8; 64 white A11; 65 black A12; 66 white C8; 67 black B8; 68 white B7; 69 black D7; 70 white D6; 71 black C7; 72 white D8; 73 black E7; 74 white E6; 75 black F8; 76 white F10; 77 black B6; 78 white A9; 79 black A8; 80 white F2; 81 black N12; 82 white O11; 83 black M13; 84 white L1; 85 black M1; 86 white B17; 87 black B5; 88 white B4; 89 black P13; 90 white N14; 91 black O12; 92 white Q12; 93 black C15; 94 white N9; 95 black T13; 96 white S13; 97 black G8; 98 white S15; 99 black T15. Marks: square on black stone at S6.8693989990468389969565453802819192645437040149508257567605034041534847527855363951946279676672759742636871697344437706707422248714132120608815111208071009002630323316178019232528273134355958298485
Moves 100–199 (118 at 107, 161 at)

Go board, 19 by 19. Black stones: J19, L19, P19, G18, J18, K18, O18, Q18, G17, H17, K17, P17, Q17, B16, G16, J16, R16, S16, C15, G15, Q15, T15, C14, H14, J14, D13, M13, P13, T13, A12, B12, D12, E12, N12, O12, B11, C11, J11, M11, A10, G10, H10, K10, L10, N10, B9, K9, M9, A8, B8, F8, G8, K8, O8, Q8, R8, S8, T8, C7, D7, E7, K7, N7, O7, P7, B6, L6, M6, S6, B5, N5, O5, P5, R5, Q4, R4, N3, O3, Q3, E2, G2, H2, J2, L2, M2, O2, H1, K1, M1. White stones: F19, G19, H19, F18, H18, N18, B17, C17, F17, N17, O17, D16, F16, K16, P16, F15, K15, P15, R15, S15, F14, G14, K14, N14, Q14, R14, F13, H13, J13, S13, C12, F12, H12, Q12, D11, E11, G11, H11, N11, O11, B10, C10, D10, F10, J10, O10, R10, J9, N9, O9, P9, S9, C8, D8, J8, M8, N8, P8, B7, J7, M7, Q7, S7, T7, C6, D6, E6, F6, J6, N6, Q6, R6, C5, F5, Q5, S5, T5, B4, D4, G4, P4, C3, D3, E3, G3, J3, K3, L3, M3, D2, F2, K2, N2. Moves: 0 white T14; 1 black S14; 2 white T12; 3 black M16; 4 white N15; 5 black A17; 6 white A18; 7 black A16; 8 white C16; 9 black B14; 10 white L17; 11 black L18; 12 white P12; 13 black O14; 14 white M17; 15 black B18; 16 white C18; 17 black A19; 18 white G9; 19 black H8; 20 white H9; 21 black K12; 22 white L13; 23 black M14; 24 white L12; 25 black M12; 26 white M15; 27 black L14; 28 white K13; 29 black A5; 30 white M10; 31 black L11; 32 white K6; 33 black L7; 34 white T6; 35 black P6; 36 white S4; 37 black S3; 38 white Q9; 39 black R7; 41 black T16; 42 white N19; 43 black O19; 44 white J15; 45 black H15; 46 white H3; 47 black N1; 48 white L5; 49 black M4; 50 white L4; 51 black M5; 52 white F1; 53 black L1; 54 white E8; 55 black F7; 56 white H7; 57 black A7; 58 white L9; 59 black O15; 60 white P14; 61 black D15; 62 white A4; 63 black E15; 64 white E16; 65 black L15; 66 white L16; 67 black Q16; 68 white Q13; 69 black O13; 70 white T9; 72 white F9; 73 black L8; 74 white G7; 77 black C9; 78 white D9; 79 black R9; 80 white S10. Marks: triangle on black stone at M9; square on white stone at B7; square on black stone at S6.1742430615161105101407086466036741616345446526045909272313600100282269682124251202313080777872182058△387970541973575574563339323534294851625049364637525347
Moves 200–280 (240 at 200, 271 at,
275 at, 276 at)

== Coverage ==
Live video of the games and associated commentary was broadcast in Korean, Chinese, Japanese, and English. Korean-language coverage was made available through Baduk TV. Chinese-language coverage of game 1 with commentary by 9-dan players Gu Li and Ke Jie was provided by Tencent and LeTV respectively, reaching about 60 million viewers. Online English-language coverage presented by US 9-dan Michael Redmond and Chris Garlock, a vice-president of the American Go Association, reached an average 80 thousand viewers with a peak of 100 thousand viewers near the end of game 1.

== Responses ==
=== AI community ===
AlphaGo's victory was a major milestone in artificial intelligence research. Go had previously been regarded as a hard problem in machine learning that was expected to be out of reach for the technology of the time. Most experts thought a Go program as powerful as AlphaGo was at least five years away; some experts thought that it would take at least another decade before computers would beat Go champions. Most observers at the beginning of the 2016 matches expected Lee to beat AlphaGo.

With games such as checkers, chess, and now Go dominated by computer players, victories at popular board games can no longer serve as significant new milestones for artificial intelligence, as they had for decades. Deep Blue's Murray Campbell called AlphaGo's victory "the end of an era... board games are more or less done and it's time to move on."

When compared with Deep Blue or with Watson, AlphaGo's underlying algorithms are potentially more general-purpose and may be evidence that the scientific community is making progress toward artificial general intelligence. Some commentators believe AlphaGo's victory makes for a good opportunity for society to start discussing preparations for the possible future impact of machines with general purpose intelligence. In March 2016, AI researcher Stuart Russell stated that "AI methods are progressing much faster than expected, (which) makes the question of the long-term outcome more urgent," adding that "to ensure that increasingly powerful AI systems remain completely under human control... there is a lot of work to do." Some scholars, such as physicist Stephen Hawking, warn that some future self-improving AI could gain actual general intelligence, leading to an unexpected AI takeover; other scholars disagree: AI expert Jean-Gabriel Ganascia believes that "Things like 'common sense'... may never be reproducible", and says "I don't see why we would speak about fears. On the contrary, this raises hopes in many domains such as health and space exploration." Richard Sutton said, "I don't think people should be scared... but I do think people should be paying attention."

The DeepMind AlphaGo Team received the Inaugural IJCAI Marvin Minsky Medal for Outstanding Achievements in AI. "AlphaGo is a wonderful achievement, and a perfect example of what the Minsky Medal was initiated to recognise", said Professor Michael Wooldridge, Chair of the IJCAI Awards Committee. "What particularly impressed IJCAI was that AlphaGo achieves what it does through a brilliant combination of classic AI techniques as well as the state-of-the-art machine learning techniques that DeepMind is so closely associated with. It's a breathtaking demonstration of contemporary AI, and we are delighted to be able to recognise it with this award".

=== Go community ===
Go is a popular game in South Korea, China, and Japan. This match was watched and analyzed by millions of people worldwide. Many top Go players characterized AlphaGo's unorthodox plays as seemingly-questionable moves that initially befuddled onlookers but made sense in hindsight: "All but the very best Go players craft their style by imitating top players. AlphaGo seems to have totally original moves it creates itself." AlphaGo appeared to have unexpectedly become much stronger, even when compared with its October 2015 match against Fan Hui where a computer had beaten a Go professional for the first time without the advantage of a handicap.

China's number one player, Ke Jie, who was at the time the top-ranked player worldwide, initially claimed that he would be able to beat AlphaGo, but declined to play against it for fear that it would "copy my style". As the matches progressed, Ke Jie went back and forth, stating that "it is highly likely that I (could) lose" after analyzing the first three matches, but regaining confidence after the fourth match. In the end, Ke Jie played Alpha Go the next year and was defeated in three games.

Toby Manning, the referee of AlphaGo's match against Fan Hui, and Hajin Lee, secretary general of the International Go Federation, both reason that in the future, Go players will get help from computers to learn what they have done wrong in games and improve their skills.

After game three, Lee apologized for his losses and stated, "I misjudged the capabilities of AlphaGo and felt powerless." He emphasized that the defeat was "Lee Se-dol's defeat" and "not a defeat of mankind". Lee said his eventual loss to a machine was "inevitable" but stated that "robots will never understand the beauty of the game the same way that we humans do." Lee called his game four victory a "priceless win that I (would) not exchange for anything."

Three years later, on 19 November 2019, Lee announced his retirement from professional play, arguing that he could never be the top overall player of Go due to the increasing dominance of AI. Lee referred to them as being "an entity that cannot be defeated".

=== Government ===
In response to the match the South Korean government announced on 17 March 2016 that it would invest 1 trillion won (US$863 million) in artificial intelligence (AI) research over the next five years.

=== Other human vs AI competitors ===
Ken Jennings, who was famously defeated in 2011 by IBM Watson in a two-game Jeopardy! The IBM Challenge between the AI supercomputer and two of the game show's legendary champions, wrote in Slate magazine after the event. He stated, "The nightmarish robot dystopias of science-fiction movies just got one benchmark closer."

There’s a disorienting, airless vibe to facing an artificial challenger. You feel unexpectedly alone in the spotlight, but at the same time you’re hyperaware of the millions of tech dollars and labs full of anonymous nerds arrayed against you. Your new opponent, unlike everyone you’ve ever played in the past, can never become overconfident or intimidated. There’s no way to play it psychologically at all, because it has no psychology.

Jennings compared AlphaGo to Kurt Vonnegut's 1952 novel Player Piano, where artificial intelligence eliminates almost all careers, and a those whose jobs were replaced by AI, in Vonnegut's novel, are placed into a government Works Progress Administration-style organisation that revolts because of people lost self-respect to AI. He stated it was "charmingly retrofuturistic as Walt Disney's Tomorrowland."

Jennings, who was eventually named interim host on October 29, 2020 and permanent full-time host of Jeopardy! on December 15, 2023, concluded his article with the following:

I assume that Lee, like (Garry) Kasparov and me before him, will eventually make it through the five stages of automation obsolescence and accept his pioneering role in the early history of "thinking" machines. But what about all those newly replaceable souls who come after us, in a seismic shift that seems about to reshape our entire economy? For now, it’s just a handful of chess and Go and Jeopardy! champions who no longer feel needed and useful. But what happens to society when it’s tens of millions of us?

== In media ==
An award-winning documentary film about the matches, AlphaGo, was made in 2017. On 13 March 2020, the film was made free online on the DeepMind YouTube channel.

The matches were featured in Benjamin Labatut's 2023 novel, The MANIAC.

== See also ==
- AlphaGo versus Ke Jie
