= Go centers =

Venue to play the game of Go

As part of the effort to spread the game of Go throughout the world, several Go centers were founded in the United States, Europe and South America. A large part of the required funds was contributed by the Iwamoto Foundation. This foundation was founded by Iwamoto Kaoru (1902–1999), donating 530 million yen from his own means.

Recently a Korean project established a Go Centre in Budapest, Hungary.
