= Sensei's Library =

Internet site dedicated to the game of Go

- Website type: Wiki
- Available in: English
- Creators: Morten Pahle and Arno Hollosi
- Website: senseis.xmp.net
- Launched: September 2000; 26 years ago

Sensei's Library (commonly referred to as SL among Go-players) is an Internet website and wiki, dedicated to articles about, and discussion of, the game of Go. It was started in September 2000, by the Go players Morten Pahle and Arno Hollosi. Hollosi is also known for designing version 4 of Anders Kierulf's popular SGF file format and for his work with the Austrian Citizen Card project.

Sensei's Library is used for a number of purposes, and contains over 26,000 pages on a wide range of topics, such as the culture and history of Go, Go theory, strategy, and community information. It is highly regarded in the Go community. One reviewer noted that as "a collaborative resource written by contributors, Sensei's Library may be the most extensive Go resource on the web. Articles cover a variety of topics, including possibly the best discussion of endgame theory published anywhere." Among its contributors are some published Go authors, such as Charles Matthews and John Fairbairn.
