= Go (game) =

Abstract strategy board game

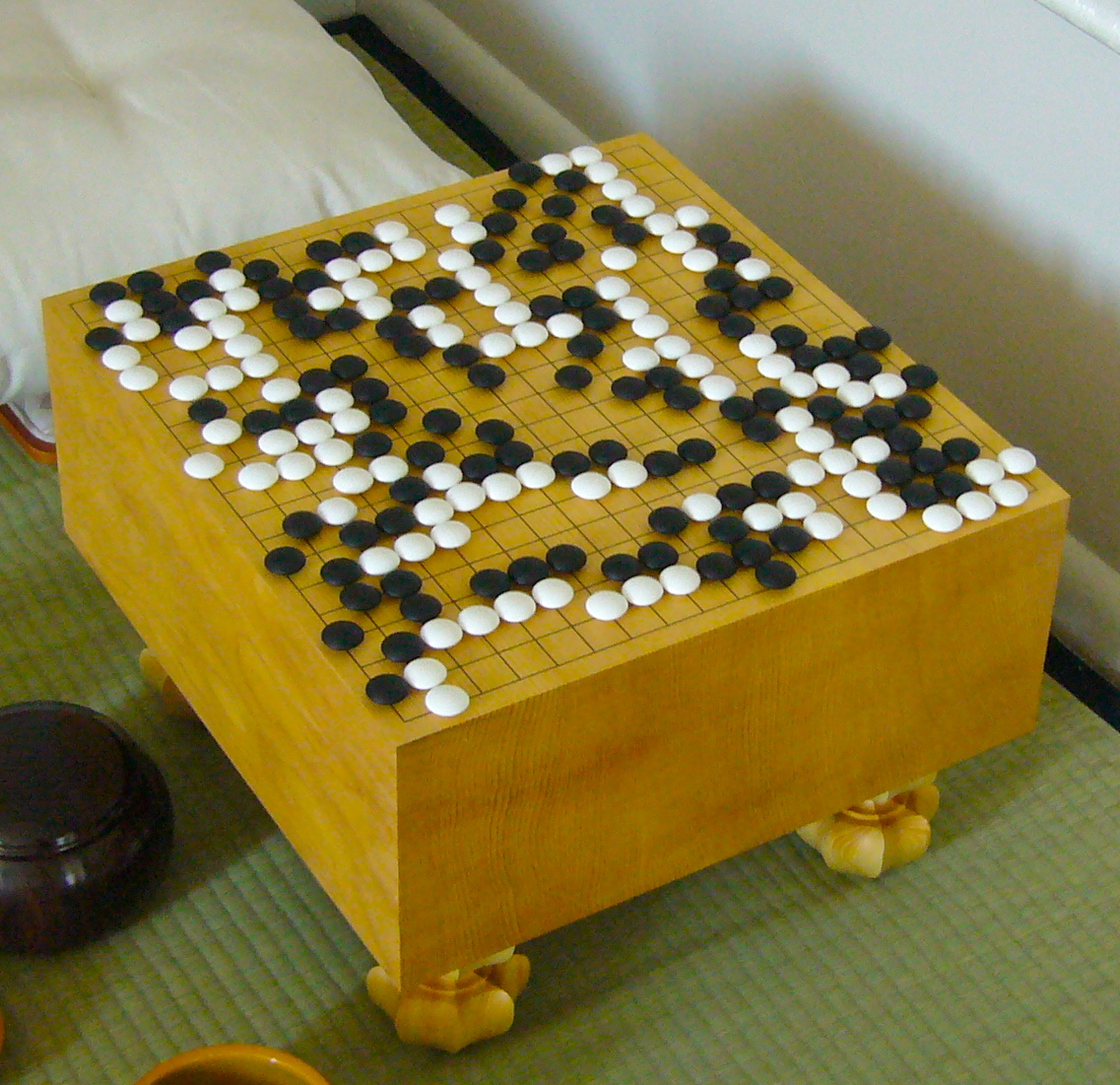
- Go is played on a grid (usually 19×19). Game pieces (stones) are placed on the grid line intersections.
- Years active: 548 BCE (earliest record) to present
- Genres: Board game; Abstract strategy game; Mind sport
- Players: 2
- Setup time: Minimal
- Playing time: Casual: 20–90 minutes; Professional: 1–6 hours or more^{[a]}
- Chance: None
- Skills: Strategy, tactics, elementary arithmetic
- Synonyms: Weiqi; Igo; Paduk / Baduk
- ^{a} Some professional games exceed 16 hours and are played over two days.

Go

Chinese name
- Traditional Chinese: 圍棋
- Simplified Chinese: 围棋
- Literal meaning: 'encirclement board game'
Transcriptions
Standard Mandarin
- Hanyu Pinyin: wéiqí
- Bopomofo: ㄨㄟˊ ㄑㄧˊ
- Wade–Giles: wei^{2}-chʻi^{2}
- Tongyong Pinyin: wéi-cí
- IPA: [wěɪ.tɕʰǐ]
Wu
- Suzhounese: we^{2}-ji^{2}
Yue: Cantonese
- Yale Romanization: wàih-kèih
- Jyutping: wai4 kei4
- IPA: [wɐj˩ kʰej˩]
Southern Min
- Hokkien POJ: uî-kî
Middle Chinese
- Middle Chinese: hwigi
Old Chinese
- Baxter–Sagart (2014): *[ɢ]ʷə[j] [ɡ](r)ə
- Zhengzhang: *ɢʷɯl ɡɯ

Korean name
- Hangul: 바둑
Transcriptions
- Revised Romanization: baduk
- McCune–Reischauer: paduk

Japanese name
- Kanji: 囲碁 or 碁
- Hiragana: いご or ご
- Katakana: イゴ or ゴ
Transcriptions
- Romanization: igo or go

Go, weiqi, or baduk is an abstract strategy board game for two players in which the aim is to fence off more territory than the opponent. The game was invented in China more than 2,500 years ago and is believed to be the oldest board game continuously played to the present. A 2016 survey by the International Go Federation's 75 member nations found that over 46 million people worldwide know how to play Go, with over 20 million current players, the majority of whom live in East Asia.

The playing pieces are called stones. One player uses the white stones and the other black stones. The players take turns placing their stones on the vacant intersections (points) on the board. Once placed, stones may not be moved, but captured stones are removed from the board. A single stone (or connected group of stones) is captured when surrounded by the opponent's stones on all orthogonally adjacent points. The game proceeds until neither player wishes to make another move.

When a game concludes, the winner is determined by counting each player's surrounded territory along with captured stones and komi (points added to the score of the player with the white stones as compensation for playing second). Games may also end by resignation.

The standard Go board has a 19×19 grid of lines, containing 361 points. Beginners often play on 9×9 or 13×13 boards, and archaeological evidence shows that the game was played in earlier centuries on a 17×17 board. The 19×19 board had become standard by the time the game reached Korea in the 5th century CE and Japan in the 7th century CE.

Go was considered one of the four arts of cultured aristocratic Chinese scholars in antiquity. The earliest written reference to the game is generally recognized as the historical annal Zuo Zhuan (c. 4th century BCE).

Despite its relatively simple rules, Go is extremely complex. Compared to chess, Go has a larger board with more scope for play, longer games, and, on average, many more possible moves to consider. The number of legal board positions in Go is about 2.1×10^{170}, (Note: Game complexity can be difficult to estimate. The number of legal positions (state-space complexity) in chess has been estimated at anywhere between 10^{43} and 10^{50}; in 2016 the number of legal positions for 19x19 Go was calculated by Tromp and Farneback at ~2.08×10^{170}. Alternately, a measure of all the alternatives to be considered at each stage of the game (game-tree complexity) can be estimated with b^{d}, where b is the game's breadth (number of legal moves per position) and d is its depth (number of moves or plies per game). For chess and Go the comparison is very rough, ~35^{80} ≪ ~250^{150}, or ~10^{123} ≪ ~10^{360}) which is far greater than the number of atoms in the observable universe, estimated to be on the order of 10^{80}.

== Names of the game ==
The name Go is a short form of the Japanese word igo (囲碁; いご), which derives from earlier wigo (ゐご), in turn from Middle Chinese ɦʉi gi (圍棋, Mandarin: wéiqí, lit. 'encirclement board game' or 'board game of surrounding'). In English, the name Go is often capitalized to differentiate it from the common word go. In events sponsored by the Ing Chang-ki Foundation, it is spelled goe.

The Korean name baduk (바둑) is a native derived term, most likely originally consisting of 밭 (Yale: pàth, 'cultivated field') + *돍〯 (Yale: twǒlk, "stone", presumed dialectal variant of Seoul 돓〯 twǒlh, 'stone'). Less plausible etymologies include a derivation of Badukdok, referring to the playing pieces of the game, or a derivation from Chinese páizi (排子), meaning 'to arrange pieces'.

== Overview ==
The first 150 moves of a Go game animated.

Go is an adversarial game between two players with the objective of capturing territory: that is, occupying and surrounding a larger total empty area of the board with one's stones than the opponent. As the game progresses, the players place stones on the board, creating stone "formations" and enclosing spaces. Once placed, stones are never moved, but they are removed from the board when "captured". Stones are linked together into formations by being adjacent along the black lines, not on diagonals (of which there are none). Contests between opposing formations are often extremely complex and may result in the expansion, reduction, or wholesale capture and loss of formations and their enclosed empty spaces (or "eyes"). One essential aspect of the game is control of the sente (that is, controlling the offense, so that one's opponent is forced into defensive moves); this usually changes several times during play.

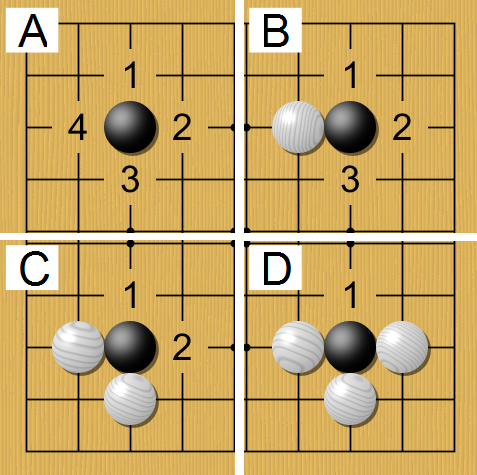
The illustration [A] displays the four "liberties" (adjacent empty points) of a single black stone. Illustrations [B], [C], and [D] show White reducing those liberties progressively by one. In [D], when Black has only one liberty left, that stone is under attack and about to be captured and eliminated (a state called atari). White may capture that stone (remove it from the board) with a play on its last liberty (at D-1).

Initially, the board is bare. Players take turns, placing one stone per turn. As the game proceeds, players try to link their stones together into "living" formations (meaning that they are permanently safe from capture), while threatening to capture their opponent's stones and formations. Thus, stones have both offensive and defensive characteristics, depending on the situation.

An essential aspect of the game is that any formation of stones must have, or be able to make, at least two enclosed open points, known as eyes, to preserve itself from being captured. A formation of two or more eyes cannot be captured, even after it is surrounded by the opponent on the outside, because each eye constitutes a liberty that must be filled by the opponent as the final step in capture. Once surrounded, a formation with a single eye can be captured on the next move if one's opponent fills the eye and surrounds all stones in the formation, but with two eyes, surrounding the formation is impossible, as filling one eye does not capture the formation, instead simply sacrificing the stone filling that eye. Thus, a formation having two or more eyes is said to be unconditionally alive, meaning it can never be captured, while a group that cannot form two eyes is said to be dead and can be captured unless it is later connected to a formation with a second eye.

The general strategy is to place stones to fence off territory, attack the opponent's weak groups (trying to kill them so they will be removed), and stay mindful of the life status of one's groups. Situations where mutually opposing groups must capture each other or die are called capturing races, or semeai. In a capturing race, the group with more liberties will be able to capture the opponent's stones. (Note: Eyes and other complications may need to be considered when counting liberties) Capturing races and the elements of life or death are the primary challenges of Go.

In the endgame, players may pass rather than place a stone if they think there is no profitable move. The game ends when both players pass or when one resigns. In general, to score the game, each player counts the unoccupied points surrounded by their stones and then subtracts the number of stones the opponent captured. The player with the higher score (after adjusting for handicapping, called komi) wins.

In the game's opening stages, players typically establish groups of stones (or bases) near the board's corners and around its sides, usually starting on the third or fourth line from the edge. The edges and corners make it easier to develop groups with better options for life (viability that prevents capture) and establish formations for territory. Players usually start near the corners, because establishing territory is easier with the aid of two edges. Established corner opening sequences are called joseki and are often studied independently. In the midgame, stone groups must also reach in toward the large central area to capture more territory.

Dame are points in between the boundary walls of black and white, and as such are considered to be of no value to either side. Seki are mutually alive pairs of white and black groups where neither has two eyes.

Ko (Chinese and Japanese: 劫) is a potentially indefinitely repeated stone-capture position. The rules prohibit repetition of a position. Therefore, any move that would restore the previous position is prohibited. If the play requires a strategic response by the first player, further changing the board, then the second player may "retake the ko", and the first player is in the same situation: needing to change the board before trying to retake the ko. And so on. Some of these ko fights are important and decide the life of a large group, while others are worth just one or two points. Ko fights in which only one side has a lot to lose are called picnic kos—in Japanese, hanami ko.

Playing with others usually requires knowledge of each player's strength, indicated by the player's rank (increasing from 30 kyu to 1 kyu, then 1 dan to 7 dan, then 1 dan pro to 9 dan pro). A difference in rank may be compensated by a handicap—e.g., Black may be allowed to place two or more stones on the board to compensate for White's greater strength. There are different rule sets (Korean, Japanese, Chinese, AGA, etc.), which are almost entirely equivalent, except for certain special-case positions and the method of scoring at the end.

=== Basic concepts ===
Basic strategic aspects include:

- Connection: Keeping one's own stones connected means that fewer groups need to make living shapes and the player has fewer groups to defend.
- Cut: Keeping opposing stones disconnected means that the opponent needs to defend and make living shape for more groups.
- Stay alive: The simplest way to stay alive is to establish a foothold in the corner or along one of the sides. At a minimum, a group must have two eyes (separate open points) to be alive. An opponent cannot fill in either of two (or more) eyes in their opponent's formation, as any such move is suicidal, and suicidal plays are prohibited.
- Mutual life (seki) is better than dying: A situation in which neither player can play on a particular point without then allowing the other player to play at another point to capture. The most common example is that of adjacent groups that share their last few liberties—if either player plays in the shared liberties, they can reduce their own group to a single liberty (putting themselves in atari), allowing their opponent to capture it on the next move.
- Death: A group that lacks living shape is eventually removed from the board as captured.
- Invasion: Establishing a new living formation in an area where one's opponent had dominance reduces one's opponent's score in proportion to the area one occupies.
- Reduction: Placing a stone far enough into the opponent's area of influence to reduce the amount of territory they eventually get, but not so far that it can be cut off from friendly stones outside.
- Sente: A play that forces one's opponent to respond (gote). A player who can regularly play sente has the initiative and can control the flow of the game.
- Sacrifice: Allowing a group to die in order to carry out a play, or plan, in a more important area.

Strategy can become very abstract and complex. High-level players spend years improving their understanding of strategy, and a novice may play many hundreds of games against opponents before being able to win regularly.

One fundamental strategy, and learning technique, is to play one's stones where one's opponent would wish to play theirs. Relatedly, switching positions (white changing to play black, and vice versa) is a useful way to learn to see one's opponent's opportunities and strategy.

== Strategy ==
Strategy deals with global influence, the interaction between distant stones, keeping the whole board in mind during local fights, and other issues that involve the overall game. It is therefore possible to allow a tactical loss when it confers a strategic advantage.

Novices often place stones randomly, as if it were a game of chance. An understanding of how stones connect for greater power develops, and then a few basic common opening sequences may be understood. Learning the ways of life and death helps develop one's strategic understanding of weak groups. (Note: Whether a group is weak or strong refers to the ease with which it can be killed or made to live. See this article by Benjamin Teuber, amateur 6 dan, for some views on how important this is felt to be.) A player who both plays aggressively and can handle adversity is said to display kiai, or fighting spirit.

=== Opening strategy ===
In the opening, players usually play and gain territory in the corners first, as the presence of two edges makes it easier to surround territory and establish eyes. From a secure position in a corner, one can lay claim to more territory by extending along the side of the board. The opening is the most theoretically difficult part of the game and takes a large proportion of professional players' thinking time. The first stone played at a corner of the board is generally placed on the third or fourth line from the edge. Players tend to play on or near the 4–4 star point during the opening. Playing nearer to the edge does not produce enough territory to be efficient, and playing farther from the edge does not secure the territory.

In the opening, players often play established sequences called joseki, which are locally balanced exchanges, but the joseki should also produce a satisfactory result on a global scale. It is generally advisable to keep a balance between territory and influence. Which of these gets precedence is often a matter of individual taste.

=== Middlegame and endgame ===
The middle phase of the game is the most combative, and usually lasts more than 100 moves. During the middlegame, the players invade each other's territories and attack formations that lack the necessary two eyes for viability. Such groups may be saved or sacrificed for something more significant. A player may succeed in capturing a large weak group of the opponent's, which often proves decisive and ends the game by resignation. But matters may be more complex, with major tradeoffs, apparently dead groups reviving, and skillful play so as to construct territories rather than kill.

The end of the middlegame and transition to the endgame is marked by a few features. Near the end of a game, play becomes divided into localized fights that do not affect each other, with the exception of ko fights. No large weak groups are still in serious danger. Moves can reasonably be given a definite value, such as 20 points or fewer, rather than simply being necessary to compete. Both players set limited objectives, making or destroying territory, capturing or saving stones. These changing aspects of the game usually occur at much the same time for strong players. In brief, the middlegame switches into the endgame when the concepts of strategy and influence need reassessment in terms of concrete final result.

== Rules ==
Aside from the order of play (alternating moves, Black moves first or takes a handicap) and scoring rules, Go has essentially only two rules:

- Liberty rule: every stone remaining on the board must have at least one open point (a "liberty") directly orthogonally adjacent (up, down, left, or right), or must be part of a connected group that has at least one such open point (liberty) next to it. Stones or groups of stones that lose their last liberty are removed from the board.
- Repetition Rule (the ko rule): a stone on the board must never immediately repeat a previous position of a captured stone, so only a move elsewhere on the board is permitted that turn. Since without this rule two players could repeat their moves (capturing stones in the same places) indefinitely, this rule prevents a stalemate.

Almost all other information about how the game is played is heuristic, meaning it is learned information about how the patterns of the stones function, rather than a rule. Other rules are specialized, as they come about through different rule sets, but the above two cover almost all of any game.

There are minor differences between different countries' rule sets, most notably in Chinese and Japanese scoring rules, but they do not greatly affect tactics or strategy.

Except where noted, the basic rules presented here are valid independent of the scoring rules used. The scoring rules are explained separately. Go terms for which there is no ready English equivalent are commonly called by their Japanese names.

=== Basic rules ===
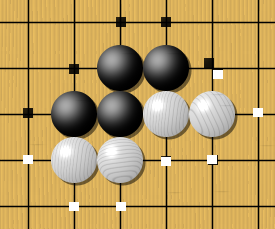
One black chain and two white chains, with their liberties marked with dots. Liberties are shared among all stones of a chain and can be counted. Here the black group has 5 liberties, while the two white chains have 4 liberties each.

The two players, Black and White, take turns placing stones of their color on the intersections of the board, one stone at a time. The standard board size is 19×19, but for beginners or for quick games, 13×13 and 9×9 boards are popular. The board is empty at the start. Black plays first unless given a handicap of two or more stones, in which case White plays first. A stone may be placed on any unoccupied intersection except those forbidden by the ko and suicide rules (see below). Once played, a stone cannot be moved and may be taken off the board only if captured. A player may pass their turn, declining to place a stone, though this is usually done only in the endgame, when both players believe nothing can be accomplished by further play. When both players pass consecutively, the game ends and is scored.

=== Liberties and capture ===
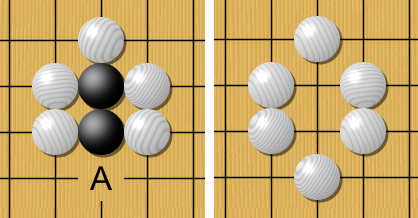
The Black stone group has only one liberty (at point A), so it is very vulnerable to capture. If Black plays at A, the chain will have 3 liberties and so be much safer. But if White plays at A first, the Black chain loses its last liberty and is thus captured and removed from the board, leaving White's stones as shown to the right.

Vertically and horizontally adjacent stones of the same color form a chain (also called a string or group), forming a discrete unit that cannot then be divided. Only stones connected to one another by the lines on the board create a chain; stones that are diagonally adjacent are not connected. Chains may be expanded by placing additional stones on adjacent intersections, and they can be connected together by placing a stone on an intersection adjacent to two or more chains of the same color.

A vacant point adjacent to a stone, along one of the grid lines, is called a liberty for that stone. Stones in a chain share their liberties. A chain of stones must have at least one liberty to remain on the board. When a chain is surrounded by opposing stones so that it has no liberties, it is captured and removed from the board.

=== Ko rule ===
Go board, 5 by 5. Black stones: B4, A3, B2. White stones: C4, D3, C2. Moves: 1 black C3. Marks: circle at B3.1

An example of a situation in which the ko rule applies

Players may not make a move that returns the game to the immediately prior position. This rule, called the ko rule, prevents endless repetition (stalemate). As shown in the example pictured: White had a stone, indicated by the red circle, captured by Black placing a stone at point 1. Black's stone at point 1 is now at risk of capture by the three adjacent White stones. If White were allowed to place its next stone on the point marked by the red circle, the board would return to its previous position. The ko rule forbids this: White must make a different move or pass. To capture Black's stone at point 1, White must attack Black elsewhere so that Black moves to counter. If this attempt is successful, it is considered "gaining the sente"; after Black responds elsewhere, White can take Black's stone at point 1, and the ko continues, but now Black must make a move elsewhere. A repetition of such exchanges is called a "ko fight". To stop the potential for ko fights, two stones of the same color must be added to the group, making a group of either five Black or five White stones.

While the various rule sets all prohibit returning the board to the immediately previous position, they deal differently with the relatively uncommon situation in which a player might recreate an earlier past position. See Rules of Go § Repetition for further information.

=== Suicide ===
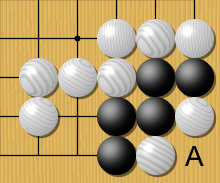
Under normal rules, White cannot play at A because that point has no liberties. Under the Ing and New Zealand rules, White may play A, a suicide stone that kills itself and the two neighboring white stones, leaving an empty three-space eye. Black naturally answers by playing at A, creating two eyes to live.

A player may not place a stone such that it or its group immediately has no liberties unless doing so immediately deprives an enemy group of its final liberty. In the second case, the enemy group is captured, leaving the new stone with at least one liberty, so the new stone can be placed. This rule is responsible for the all-important difference between one and two eyes: if a group with only one eye is fully surrounded, it can be killed with a stone placed in its single eye. (An eye is an empty point or group of points surrounded by a group of stones.)

The Ing and New Zealand rules lack this rule, permitting a player to destroy one of their groups (commit suicide). This play would be useful only in situations involving a small interior space or planning. In the example at right, it may be useful as a ko threat.

=== Komi ===
Because Black has the advantage of playing first, the idea of awarding White compensation arose during the 20th century. This is called komi, which gives white a 6.5-point compensation under Japanese rules, 6.5 points under Korean rules, and 15/4 stones, or 7.5 points, under Chinese rules (the number of points varies by rule set). Under handicap play, White receives only a 0.5-point komi, to break a possible tie (jigo).

=== Scoring rules ===
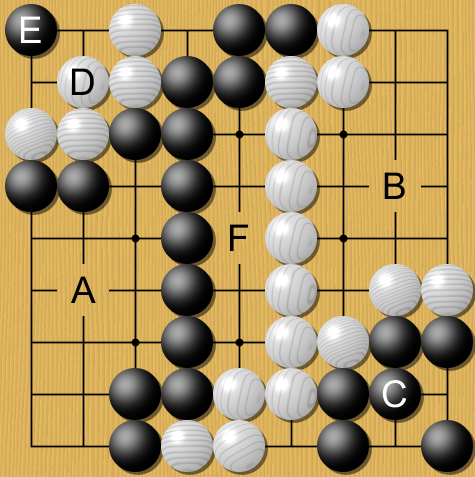
A simplified game at its end. Black's territory (A) + (C) and prisoners (D) are counted and compared to White's territory (B) only (no prisoners). In this example, both Black and White attempted to invade and live (C and D groups) to reduce the other's total territory. Only Black's invading group (C) was successful in living, as White's group (D) was killed with a black stone at (E). The points in the middle (F) are dame, meaning they belong to neither player.

Two general types of scoring procedures are used, and players determine which to use before play. Both procedures almost always give the same winner.

- The area scoring procedure (including Chinese) counts the points a player's stones occupy and surround. It is associated with contemporary Chinese play and was probably established there during the Ming dynasty in the 15th or 16th century. It is beginner-friendly but takes longer. A player's score is the number of stones the player has on the board plus the number of empty intersections surrounded by that player's stones. If there is disagreement about which stones are dead, then under area scoring rules, the players resume play to resolve the matter. The score is computed using the position after the next time the players pass consecutively.
- The territory scoring procedure (including Japanese and Korean) counts the number of empty points a player's stones surround, together with the number of stones the player captured. During a game, each player retains the stones they capture, termed prisoners. Any dead stones removed at the end of the game become prisoners. The score is the number of empty points enclosed by a player's stones plus the number of prisoners that player captured. (Note: Exceptionally, in Japanese and Korean rules, empty points, even those surrounded by stones of a single color, may count as neutral territory if some of them are alive by seki. See the section below on seki.) Under territory scoring there can be an extra penalty for playing inside one's territory, so if there is a disagreement extra play to resolve it happens, in tournament settings, on a separate board, where the player claiming a group is dead plays first and demonstrates how to capture those stones. For further information, see Rules of Go.

Both counting procedures occur after both players have passed consecutively. Stones still on the board but unable to avoid capture, called dead stones, are removed. Given that the number of stones a player has on the board is directly related to the number of prisoners their opponent has, the resulting net score, that is, the difference between Black's and White's scores, is identical under both rule sets (unless the players have passed different numbers of times during the game). Thus the result given by the two scoring systems rarely differs by more than a point.

=== Life and death ===
While not mentioned in the rules of Go (at least in simpler rule sets, such as those of New Zealand and the U.S.), the concept of a living group of stones is necessary for a practical understanding of the game.

Go board, 9 by 9. Black stones: B9, C9, G9, J9, A8, C8, G8, H8, A7, B7, H7, J7, H6, H5, J5, A3, H3, J3, B2, C2, D2, H2, A1, B1, D1, H1, J1. White stones: D9, F9, D8, F8, C7, D7, F7, G7, A6, B6, C6, G6, G5, A4, B4, G4, H4, J4, B3, C3, D3, E3, G3, E2, G2, E1, G1. Marks: circle at A9; circle at H9; circle at B8; circle at J8; circle at J6; lA tile at A2; circle at J2; circle at C1.lA

Examples of eyes (marked). The black groups at the top of the board are alive, as they have at least two eyes. The black groups at the bottom are dead as they only have one eye. The point marked a is a false eye, thus the black group with false eye a can be killed by white in two turns.

When a group of stones is mostly surrounded and has no options to connect with friendly stones elsewhere, its status is either alive, dead, or unsettled. A group of stones is said to be alive if it cannot be captured, even if the opponent is allowed to move first. A group is said to be dead if it cannot avoid capture, even if its owner is allowed the first move. Otherwise, the group is said to be unsettled: the defending player can make it alive or the opponent can kill it, depending on who plays first.

An eye is an empty point or group of points surrounded by a group of stones. If the eye is surrounded by Black stones, White cannot play there unless such a play would take Black's last liberty and capture the Black stones. (Such a move is forbidden according to the suicide rule in most rule sets, but even if not forbidden, such a move is a useless suicide of a White stone.)

If a Black group has two eyes, White can never capture it, because White cannot remove both liberties simultaneously. If Black has only one eye, White can capture the Black group by playing in the single eye, removing Black's last liberty. Such a move is not suicide because the Black stones are removed first. In the "Examples of eyes" diagram, all the circled points are eyes. The two black groups in the upper corners are alive, as both have at least two eyes. The groups in the lower corners are dead, as each has only one eye. The group in the lower left may seem to have two eyes, but the surrounded empty point marked a is not actually an eye. White can play there and take a black stone. Such a point is often called a false eye.

=== Seki (mutual life) ===
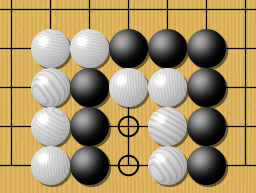
Example of seki (mutual life). Neither Black nor White can play on the marked points without reducing their own liberties for those groups to one (self-atari).

There is an exception to the requirement that a group must have two eyes to be alive, a situation called seki (or mutual life). When different-colored groups are adjacent and share liberties, a position may arise in which neither player wants to move first because doing so would allow their opponent to capture; in such situations, both players' stones therefore remain on the board (in seki). Neither player receives points for those groups, but the groups remain living, as opposed to being captured. (Note: In game-theoretical terms, seki positions are an example of a Nash equilibrium.)

Seki can occur in many ways. The simplest are:

1. each player has a group without eyes and they share two liberties, and
2. each player has a group with one eye and they share one more liberty.

In the "Example of seki (mutual life)" diagram, the two circled points are liberties shared by both a black and a white group. Both of these interior groups are at risk, and neither player wants to play on a circled point, because doing so would allow the opponent to capture their group on the next move. The outer groups in this example, both black and white, are alive. Seki can arise when a player attempts to invade and kill a nearly settled group of the other player.

== Tactics ==
Tactics deal with immediate fighting between stones, capturing and saving stones, life, death, and other issues localized to a specific part of the board. Issues that encompass the territory of the entire board and planning stone-group connections are called strategy and are covered in the Strategy section above.

=== Capturing tactics ===
There are several tactical constructs aimed at capturing stones. These are among the first things a player learns after the rules. Recognizing that stones can be captured using these techniques is an important step.

Go board, 9 by 9. Black stones: C7. White stones: C8, B7, D7, B6. Moves: 1 black C6; 2 white C5; 3 black D6; 4 white E6; 5 black D5; 6 white D4; 7 black E5; 8 white F5; 9 black E4; 10 white E3.13425786910

A ladder. Black cannot escape unless the ladder connects to black stones farther down the board that will intercept with the ladder or if one of white's pieces has only one liberty.

The most basic technique is the ladder. This is also sometimes called a "running attack", since it unfolds as a player tries to outrun the other's attack. To capture stones in a ladder, a player uses a constant series of capture threats (atari), giving the opponent only one place to place their stone to keep their group alive. This forces the opponent to move in a zigzag pattern (surrounding the ladder) as shown in the adjacent diagram to keep the attack coming. Unless the pattern runs into friendly stones along the way, the stones in the ladder cannot avoid capture. But if the ladder runs into other black stones, thus saving them, experienced players recognize the futility of continuing the attack. These stones can also be saved if a suitably strong threat can be forced elsewhere on the board, so that two Black stones can be placed here to save the group.

Go board, 9 by 9. Black stones: C8, A7, C7, B6, D6, D5, D4. White stones: D7, E7, C6, E6, C5, C4, C3. Moves: 1 white E3. Marks: triangle on black stone at D6; triangle on black stone at D5; circle at E5; triangle on black stone at D4; circle at E4; circle at D3.△△△1

A net. The chain of three marked Black stones cannot escape, since each Black stone attempting to extend the chain outward (on the red circles) can be blocked by a White stone.

Another technique to capture stones is the so-called net, also known by its Japanese name, geta. This is a move that loosely surrounds some stones, preventing their escape. An example is in the adjacent diagram. It is often better to capture stones in a net than in a ladder, because a net does not require that there be no opposing stones in the way or allow the opponent to play a strategic ladder breaker. However, the ladder requires only one turn to kill all the opponent's stones, whereas a net requires more turns.

Go board, 9 by 9. Black stones: D8, E8, C7, C6, D5, D4, F4, G4, E3, E2, E1. White stones: D6, E6, C5, F5, C4, D3, D2. Moves: 1 white E4. Marks: circle at E5.1

A snapback. Black can capture the white stone by playing at the circled point, but the resulting shape for Black has only one liberty (at 1), so White can then capture the three black stones by playing at 1 again (snapback).

A third technique to capture stones is the snapback. In a snapback, a player allows a single stone to be captured, then immediately plays on the point that stone formerly occupied and captures a larger group of their opponent's stones, in effect snapping back at those stones. An example can be seen on the right. As with the ladder, an experienced player does not play out such a sequence, recognizing the futility of capturing only to be captured back immediately.

=== Reading ahead ===
One of the most important skills required for strong tactical play is the ability to read ahead. Reading ahead includes considering available moves, the possible responses to each, and the possibilities after each of those responses. Some of the strongest players can read up to 40 moves ahead even in complicated positions.

As explained in the scoring rules, some stone formations can never be captured and are said to be alive, while other stones may be in a position where they cannot avoid being captured and are said to be dead. Much practice material is in the form of life-and-death problems, also known as tsumego. In such problems, players are challenged to find the move sequence that kills a group of the opponent or saves a group of their own. Tsumego are considered an excellent way to learn to read ahead, and are available for all skill levels, some posing a challenge even to top players.

=== Ko fighting ===
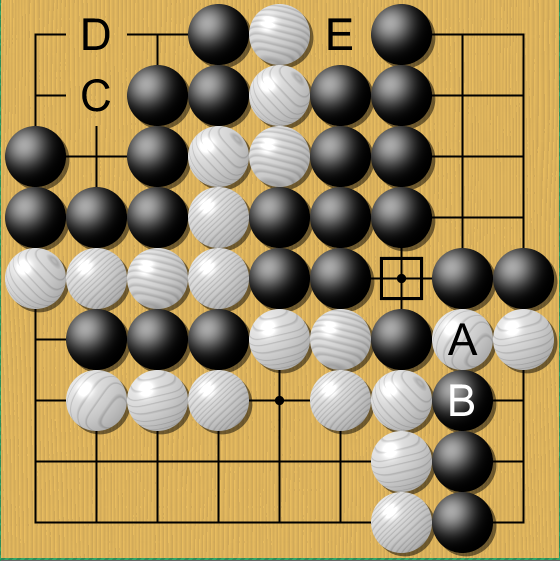
A simplified ko fight on a 9×9 board. The ko is at the point marked with a square—Black has "taken the ko" first. The ko fight determines the life of the A and B groups—only one survives and the other is captured. White may play C as a ko threat, and Black properly answers at D. White can then take the ko by playing at the square-marked point (capturing the one black stone). E is a possible ko threat for Black.

In situations when the Ko rule applies, a ko fight may occur. If the player who is prohibited from capture is of the opinion that the capture is important because it prevents a large group of stones from being captured for instance, the player may play a ko threat. This is a move elsewhere on the board that threatens to make a large profit if the opponent does not respond. If the opponent does respond to the ko threat, the situation on the board has changed, and the prohibition on capturing the ko no longer applies. Thus the player who made the ko threat may now recapture the ko. Their opponent is then in the same situation and can either play a ko threat as well or concede the ko by simply playing elsewhere. If a player concedes the ko, either because they do not think it important or because there are no moves left that could function as a ko threat, they have lost the ko, and their opponent may connect the ko.

Instead of responding to a ko threat, a player may also choose to ignore the threat and connect the ko. They thereby win the ko, but at a cost. The choice of when to respond to a threat and when to ignore it is a subtle one, which requires a player to consider many factors, including how much is gained by connecting, how much is lost by not responding, how many possible ko threats both players have remaining, what the optimal order of playing them is, and what the size—points lost or gained—of each of the remaining threats is.

Frequently, the winner of the ko fight does not connect the ko but instead captures one of the chains that constituted their opponent's side of the ko. In some cases, this leads to another ko fight at a neighboring location.

== History ==
=== Origin in China ===
The earliest written reference to the game is generally recognized as the historical annal Zuo Zhuan (c. 4th century BCE), referring to a historical event of 548 BCE. It is also mentioned in Book XVII of the Analects of Confucius and in two books written by Mencius (c. 3rd century BCE). In all of these works, the game is referred to as yì (弈). Today, in China, it is known as weiqi (simplified Chinese: 围棋; traditional Chinese: 圍棋; pinyin: wéiqí; Wade–Giles: wei ch'i), lit. 'encirclement board game'.

Go was originally played on a 17×17 line grid, but a 19×19 grid became standard by the time of the Tang dynasty (618–907 CE). Legends trace the origin of the game to the mythical Chinese emperor Yao (2337–2258 BCE), who was said to have had his counselor Shun design it for his unruly son, Danzhu, to favorably influence him. Other theories suggest that the game was derived from Chinese tribal warlords and generals, who used pieces of stone to map out attacking positions.

In China, Go had an important status among elites and was associated with ideas of self-cultivation, wisdom, and gentlemanly ideals. It was considered one of the four cultivated arts of the Chinese scholar gentleman, along with calligraphy, painting and playing the musical instrument guqin. In ancient times the rules of Go were passed on verbally, rather than being written down.

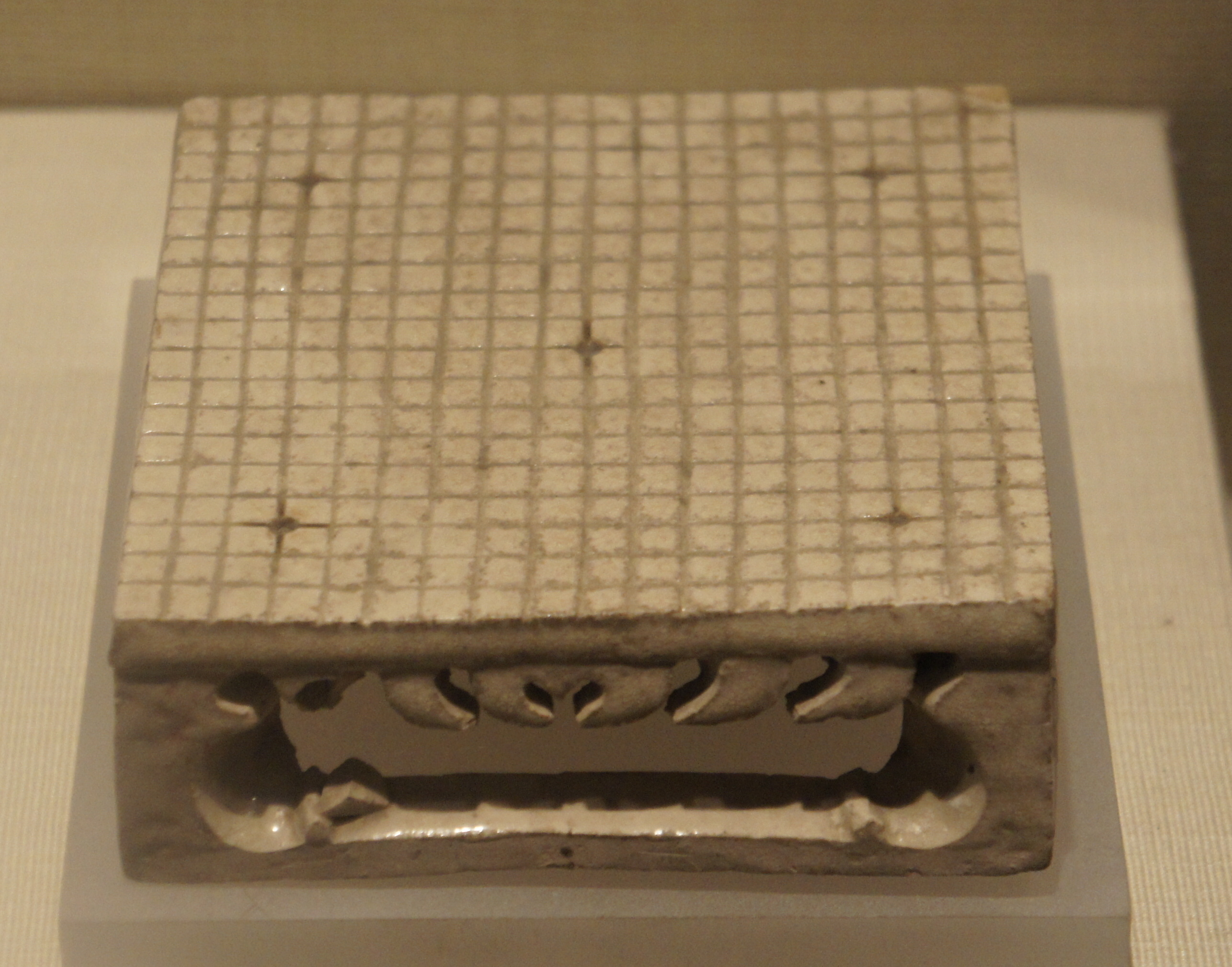
Model of a 19×19 Go board, from a tomb of the Sui dynasty (581–618 CE)

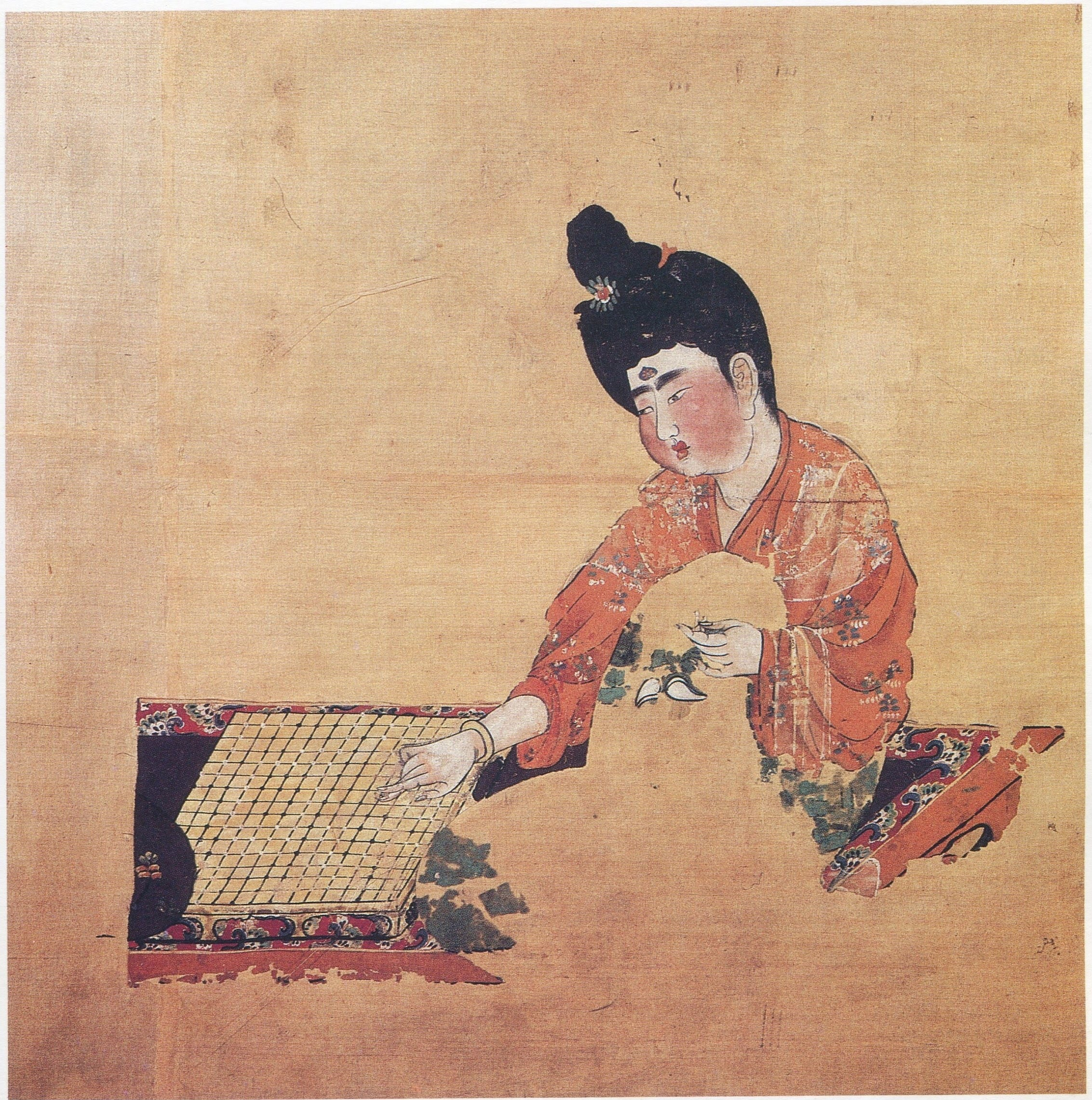
Painting of a woman playing Go, from the Astana Graves. Tang dynasty, c. 744 CE.

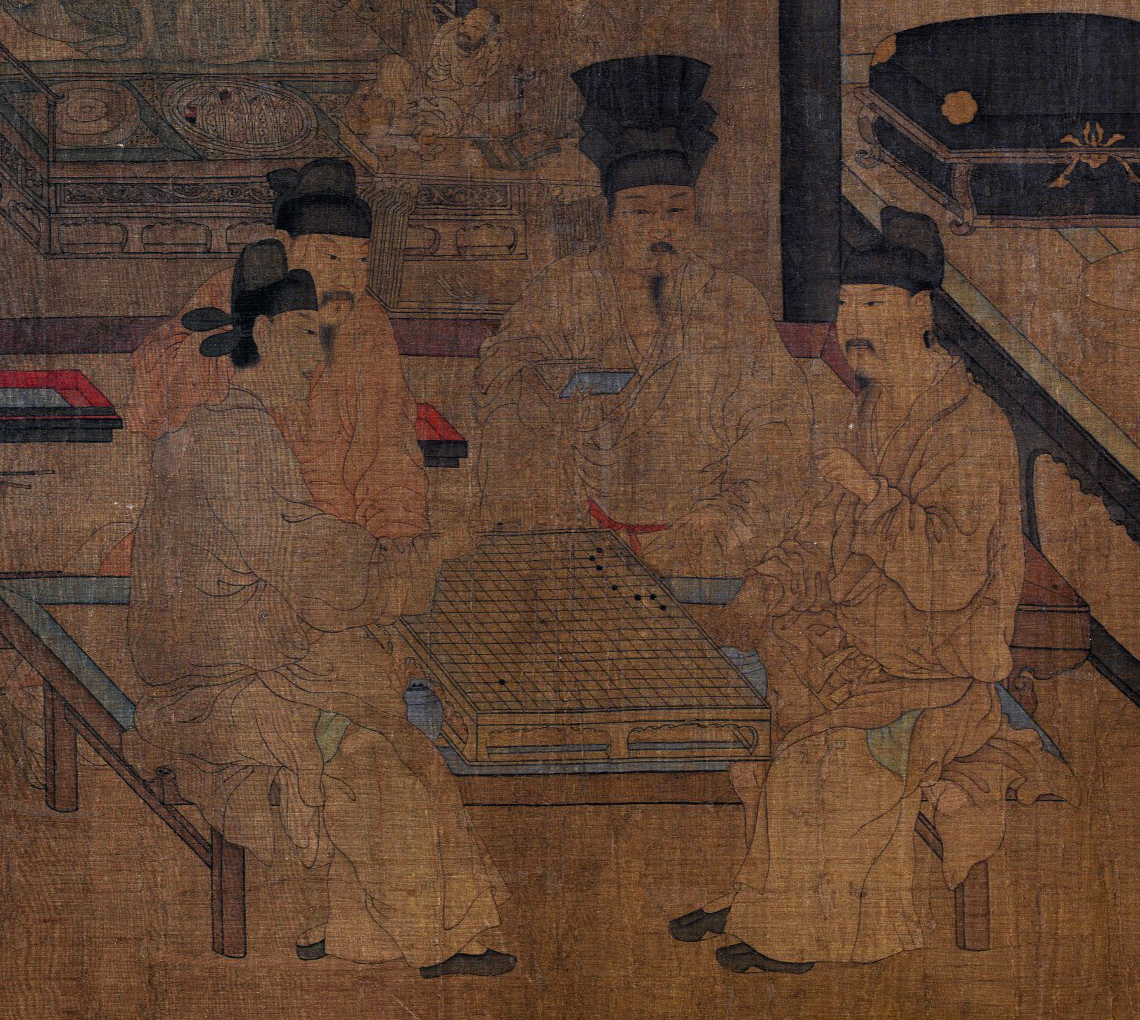
Li Jing playing Go with his brothers. Detail from a painting by Zhou Wenju (fl. 942–961 CE), Southern Tang dynasty.

=== Spread to Korea and Japan ===
Go was introduced to Korea sometime between the 5th and 7th centuries CE, and was popular among the higher classes. In Korea, the game is called baduk (Korean: 바둑), and a variant of the game called Sunjang baduk was developed by the 16th century. Sunjang baduk became the main variant played in Korea until the end of the 19th century, when the current version was reintroduced from Japan.

The game reached Japan in the 7th century CE—where it is called go (碁) or igo (囲碁). It became popular at the Japanese imperial court in the 8th century, and among the general public by the 13th century. The game was further formalized in the 15th century. In 1603, Tokugawa Ieyasu re-established Japan's unified national government. In the same year, he assigned the then-best player in Japan, a Buddhist monk named Nikkai (né Kanō Yosaburo, 1559), to the post of Godokoro (Minister of Go).

Nikkai took the name Hon'inbō Sansa and founded the Hon'inbō Go school. Several competing schools were founded soon after. These officially recognized and subsidized Go schools greatly developed the level of play and introduced the dan/kyu style system of ranking players. Players from the four schools (Hon'inbō, Yasui, Inoue and Hayashi) competed in the annual castle games, played in the presence of the shōgun.

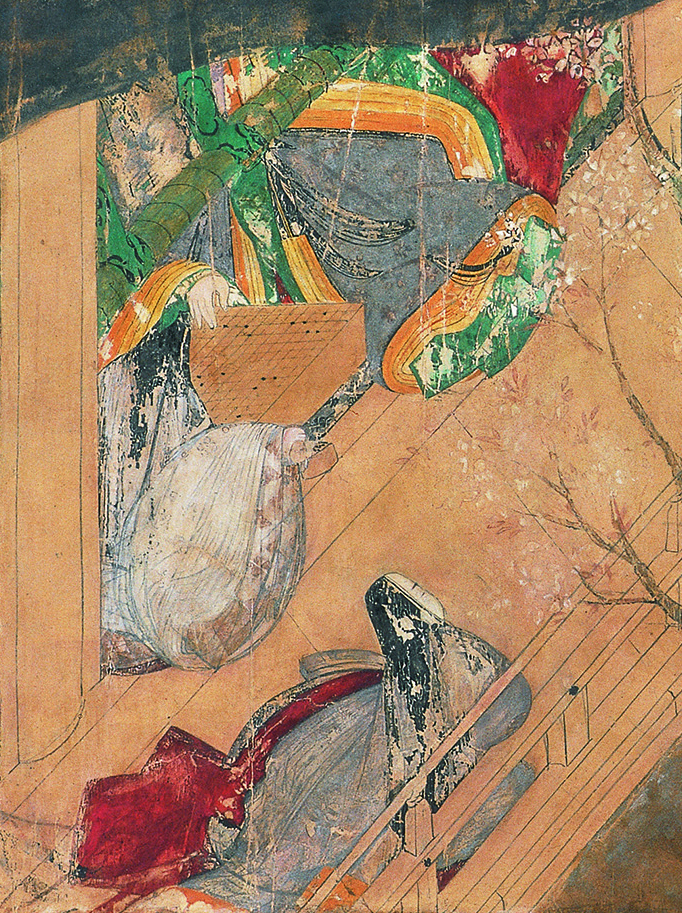
Detail from a Japanese illustrated handscroll of The Tale of Genji. Heian period, 12th century CE.

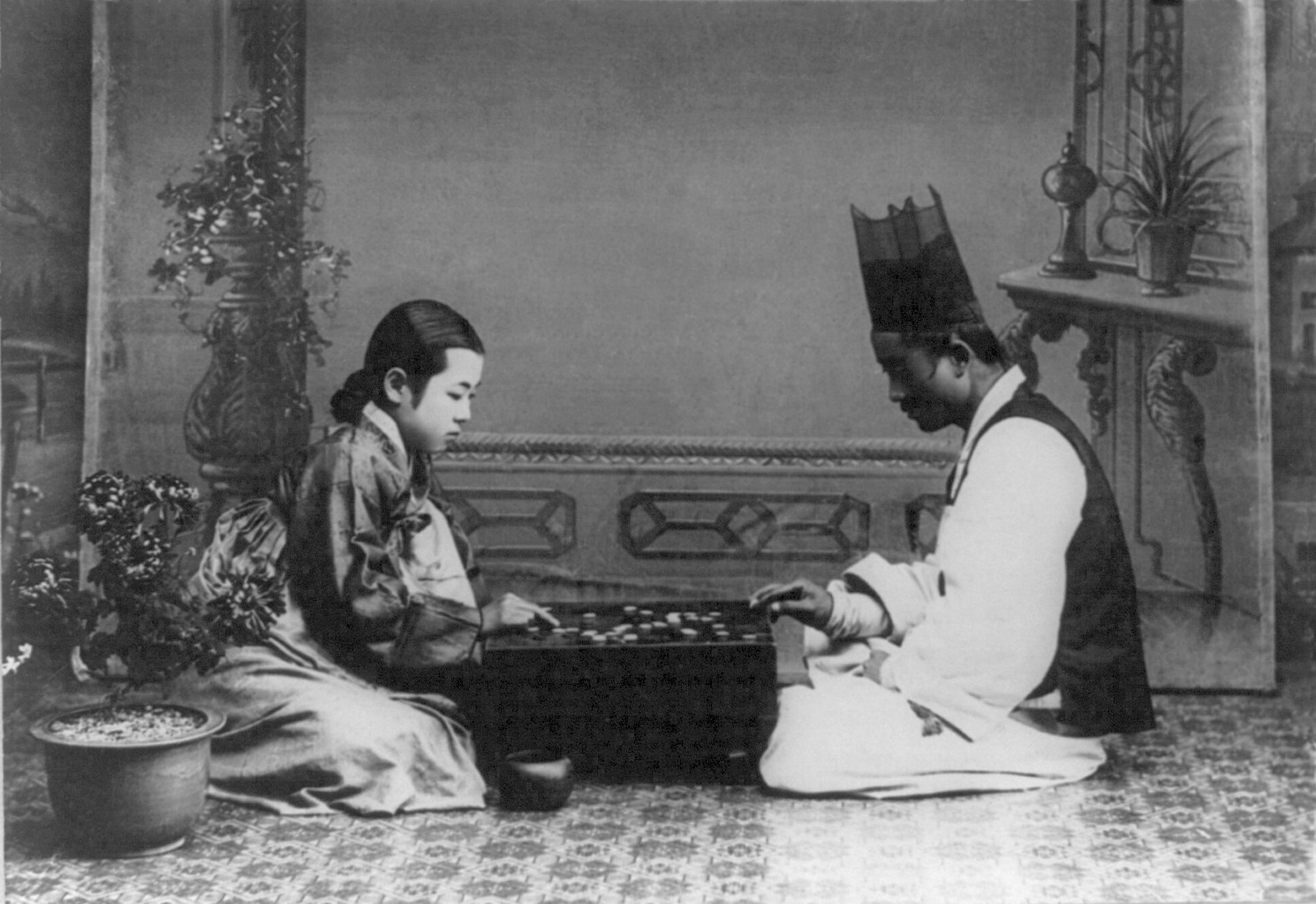
A Korean couple playing Go in traditional dress. Photographed between 1910 and 1920.

=== Internationalization ===
Despite its widespread popularity in East Asia, Go has been slow to spread to the rest of the world. Although there are some mentions of the game in western literature from the 16th century forward, Go did not start to become popular in the West until the end of the 19th century, when German scientist Oskar Korschelt wrote a treatise on the game. By the early 20th century, Go had spread throughout the German and Austro-Hungarian empires. In 1905, Edward Lasker learned the game while in Berlin. When he moved to New York, Lasker founded the New York Go Club together with (amongst others) Arthur Smith, who had learned of the game in Japan while touring the East and had published the book The Game of Go in 1908. Lasker's book Go and Go-moku (1934) helped spread the game throughout the U.S., and in 1935, the American Go Association was formed. Two years later, in 1937, the German Go Association was founded.

World War II put a stop to most Go activity, since it was a popular game in Japan, but after the war, Go continued to spread. For most of the 20th century, the Japan Go Association (Nihon Ki-in) played a leading role in spreading Go outside East Asia by publishing the English-language magazine Go Review in the 1960s, establishing Go centers in the U.S., Europe and South America, and often sending professional teachers on tour to Western nations. Internationally, the game had been commonly known since the start of the twentieth century by its shortened Japanese name, and terms for common Go concepts are derived from their Japanese pronunciation.

In 1996, NASA astronaut Daniel Barry and Japanese astronaut Koichi Wakata became the first people to play Go in space. They used a special Go set, which was named Go Space, designed by Wai-Cheung Willson Chow. Both astronauts were awarded honorary dan ranks by the Nihon Ki-in.

As of December 2015, the International Go Federation has 75 member countries, with 67 member countries outside East Asia. Chinese cultural centres across the world are promoting Go, and cooperating with local Go associations, for example the seminars held by the Chinese cultural centre in Tel Aviv, Israel, together with the Israeli Go association.

== Competitive play ==
=== Ranks and ratings ===
Three Japanese professional Go players observe some younger amateurs as they dissect a life and death problem in the corner of the board, at the US Go Congress in Houston, Texas, 2003.

In Go, rank indicates a player's skill in the game. Traditionally, ranks are measured using kyu and dan grades, a system also adopted by many martial arts. More recently, mathematical rating systems similar to the Elo rating system have been introduced. Such rating systems often provide a mechanism for converting a rating to a kyu or dan grade. Kyu grades (abbreviated k) are considered student grades and decrease as playing level increases, meaning 1st kyu is the strongest available kyu grade. Dan grades (abbreviated d) are considered master grades, and increase from 1st dan to 7th dan. First dan equals a black belt in eastern martial arts using this system. The difference among each amateur rank is one handicap stone. For example, if a 5k plays a game with a 1k, the 5k would need a handicap of four stones to even the odds. Top-level amateur players sometimes defeat professionals in tournament play. Professional players have professional dan ranks (abbreviated p). These ranks are separate from amateur ranks.

The rank system comprises, from the lowest to highest ranks:

Rank Type	Range	Stage
Double-digit kyu	30–21k	Beginner
Double-digit kyu	20–10k	Casual player
Single-digit kyu	9–1k	Intermediate/club player
Amateur dan	1–7d (where 8d is a special title)	Advanced player
Professional dan	1–9p (where 10p is a special title)	Professionals

=== Tournament and match rules ===
Tournament and match rules deal with factors that may influence the game but are not part of the actual rules of play. Such rules may differ between events. Rules that influence the game include: the setting of compensation points (komi), handicap, and time control parameters. Rules that do not generally influence the game are the tournament system, pairing strategies, and placement criteria.

Common tournament systems used in Go include the McMahon system, Swiss system, league systems and the knockout system. Tournaments may combine multiple systems; many professional Go tournaments use a combination of the league and knockout systems.

Tournament rules may also set the following:

- compensation points, called komi, which compensate the second player for the first move advantage of their opponent; tournaments commonly use a compensation in the range of 5–8 points, generally including a half-point to prevent draws;
- handicap stones placed on the board before alternate play, allowing players of different strengths to play competitively (see Go handicap for more information); and
- superko: Although the basic ko rule described above covers more than 95% of all cycles occurring in games, there are some complex situations—triple ko, eternal life, (Note: A full explanation of the eternal life position can be found on Sensei's Library, it also appears in the official text for Japanese Rules, see translation.) etc.—that are not covered by it but would allow the game to cycle indefinitely. To prevent this, the ko rule is sometimes extended to forbid the repetition of any previous position. This extension is called superko.

=== Time control ===
A game of Go may be timed using a game clock. Formal time controls were introduced into the professional game during the 1920s and were controversial. Adjournments and sealed moves began to be regulated in the 1930s. Go tournaments use a number of different time control systems. All common systems envisage a single main period of time for each player for the game, but they vary on the protocols for continuation (in overtime) after a player has finished that time allowance. (Note: Roughly, one has the time to play the game and then a little time to finish it off. Time-wasting tactics are possible in Go, so that sudden death systems, in which time runs out at a predetermined point however many plays are in the game, are relatively unpopular (in the West).) The most widely used time control system is the so-called byoyomi (Note: Literally in Japanese byōyomi means 'reading of seconds'.) system. The top professional Go matches have timekeepers so that the players do not have to press their own clocks.

Two widely used variants of the byoyomi system are:

- Standard byoyomi: After the main time is depleted, a player has a certain number of time periods (typically around thirty seconds). After each move, the number of full-time periods that the player took (often zero) is subtracted. For example, if a player has three thirty-second time periods and takes thirty or more (but less than sixty) seconds to make a move, they lose one time period. With 60–89 seconds, they lose two time periods, and so on. If, however, they take less than thirty seconds, the timer simply resets without subtracting any periods. Using up the last period means that the player has lost on time.
- Canadian byoyomi: After using all of their main time, a player must make a certain number of moves within a certain period of time, such as twenty moves within five minutes. (Note: Typically, players stop the clock, and the player in overtime sets his/her clock for the desired interval, counts out the required number of stones and sets the remaining stones out of reach, so as not to become confused. If twenty moves are made in time, the timer is reset to five minutes again.) If the time period expires without the required number of stones having been played, then the player has lost on time. (Note: In other words, Canadian byoyomi is essentially a standard chess-style time control, based on N moves in a time period T, imposed after a main period is used up. It is possible to decrease T, or increase N, as each overtime period expires; but systems with constant T and N, for example 20 plays in 5 minutes, are widely used.)

=== Notation and recording games ===
Go games are recorded with a simple coordinate system. This is comparable to algebraic chess notation, except that Go stones do not move and thus require only one coordinate per turn. Coordinate systems include purely numerical (4–4 point), hybrid (K3), and purely alphabetical. The Smart Game Format uses alphabetical coordinates internally, but most editors represent the board with hybrid coordinates as this reduces confusion.

Alternatively, the game record can also be noted by writing the successive moves on a diagram, where odd numbers mean black stones, even numbers mean white stones (or conversely when playing with a handicap), and a notation like "25=22" in the margin means that the 25th stone was played at the same location as the 22nd one, which had been captured in the meantime.

The Japanese word kifu is sometimes used to refer to a game record.

In Unicode, Go stones can be represented with black and white circles from the block Geometric Shapes:

- U+25CB ○ WHITE CIRCLE (&cir;)
- U+25CF ● BLACK CIRCLE

The block Miscellaneous Symbols includes "Go markers" that were likely meant for mathematical research of Go:

- U+2686 ⚆ WHITE CIRCLE WITH DOT RIGHT
- U+2687 ⚇ WHITE CIRCLE WITH TWO DOTS
- U+2688 ⚈ BLACK CIRCLE WITH WHITE DOT RIGHT
- U+2689 ⚉ BLACK CIRCLE WITH TWO WHITE DOTS

=== Top players and professional Go ===
A Go professional is a professional player of the game of Go. There are six areas with professional go associations, these are: China (Chinese Weiqi Association), Japan (Nihon Ki-in, Kansai Ki-in), South Korea (Korea Baduk Association), Taiwan (Taiwan Chi Yuan Culture Foundation), the United States (AGA Professional System) and Europe (European Professional System).

Although the game was developed in China, the establishment of the Four Go houses by Tokugawa Ieyasu at the start of the 17th century shifted the focus of the Go world to Japan. State sponsorship, allowing players to dedicate themselves full-time to study of the game, and fierce competition between individual houses resulted in a significant increase in the level of play. During this period, the best player of his generation was given the prestigious title Meijin (master) and the post of Godokoro (minister of Go). Of special note are the players who were dubbed Kisei (Go Sage). The only three players to receive this honor were Dōsaku, Jōwa and Shūsaku, all of the house Hon'inbō.

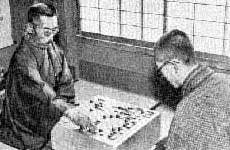
Hon'inbō Shūsai (left), last head of house Hon'inbō, plays against then-up-and-coming Go Seigen in the game of the century.

After the end of the Tokugawa shogunate and the Meiji Restoration period, the Go houses slowly disappeared, and in 1924, the Nihon Ki-in (Japanese Go Association) was formed. Top players from this period often played newspaper-sponsored matches of 2–10 games. Of special note are the (Chinese-born) player Go Seigen (Chinese: Wu Qingyuan), who scored 80% in these matches and beat down most of his opponents to inferior handicaps, and Minoru Kitani, who dominated matches in the early 1930s. These two players are also recognized for their groundbreaking work on new opening theory (Shinfuseki).

For much of the 20th century, Go continued to be dominated by players trained in Japan. Notable names included Eio Sakata, Rin Kaiho (born in Taiwan), Masao Kato, Koichi Kobayashi and Cho Chikun (born Cho Ch'i-hun, from South Korea). Top Chinese and Korean talents often moved to Japan, because the level of play there was high and funding was more lavish. One of the first Korean players to do so was Cho Namchul, who studied in the Kitani Dojo 1937–1944. After his return to Korea, the Hanguk Kiwon (Korea Baduk Association) was formed and caused the level of play in South Korea to rise significantly in the second half of the 20th century. In China, the game declined during the Cultural Revolution (1966–1976) but quickly recovered in the last quarter of the 20th century, bringing Chinese players, such as Nie Weiping and Ma Xiaochun, on par with their Japanese and South Korean counterparts. The Chinese Weiqi Association (today part of the China Qiyuan) was established in 1962, and professional dan grades started being issued in 1982. Western professional Go began in 2012 with the American Go Association's Professional System. In 2014, the European Go Federation followed suit and started their professional system.

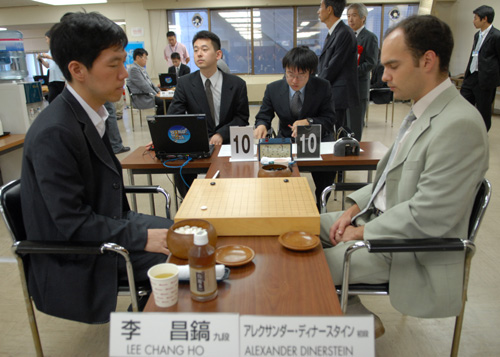
South Korean player Lee Chang-ho plays against Russian player Alexandre Dinerchtein, seven-time European Champion and one of the few non-East Asian players to reach professional status.

With the advent of major international titles from 1989 onward, it became possible to compare the level of players from different countries more accurately. Cho Hunhyun of South Korea won the first edition of the Quadrennial Ing Cup in 1989. His disciple Lee Chang-ho was the dominant player in international Go competitions for more than a decade spanning much of 1990s and early 2000s; he is also credited with groundbreaking works on the endgame. Cho, Lee and other South Korean players such as Seo Bong-soo, Yoo Changhyuk and Lee Sedol between them won the majority of international titles in this period. Several Chinese players also rose to the top in international Go from 2000s, most notably Ma Xiaochun, Chang Hao, Gu Li and Ke Jie. As of 2016, Japan lags behind in the international Go scene.

Historically, more men than women have played Go. Special tournaments for women exist, but until recently, men and women did not compete together at the highest levels; however, the creation of new, open tournaments and the rise of strong female players, most notably Rui Naiwei, have in recent years highlighted the strength and competitiveness of emerging female players.

The level in other countries has traditionally been much lower, except for some players who had preparatory professional training in East Asia. (Note: Kaku Takagawa toured Europe around 1970, and reported (Go Review) a general standard of amateur 4 dan. This is a good amateur level but no more than might be found in ordinary East Asian clubs. Published current European ratings would suggest around 100 players stronger than that, with very few European 7 dans.) Knowledge of the game has been scant elsewhere up until the 20th century. A famous player of the 1920s was Edward Lasker. (Note: European Go has been documented by Franco Pratesi, Eurogo (Florence 2003) in three volumes, up to 1920, 1920–1950, and 1950 and later.) It was not until the 1950s that more than a few Western players took up the game as other than a passing interest. In 1978, Manfred Wimmer became the first Westerner to receive a professional player's certificate from an East Asian professional Go association. In 2000, American Michael Redmond became the first Western player to achieve a 9 dan rank.

== Equipment ==
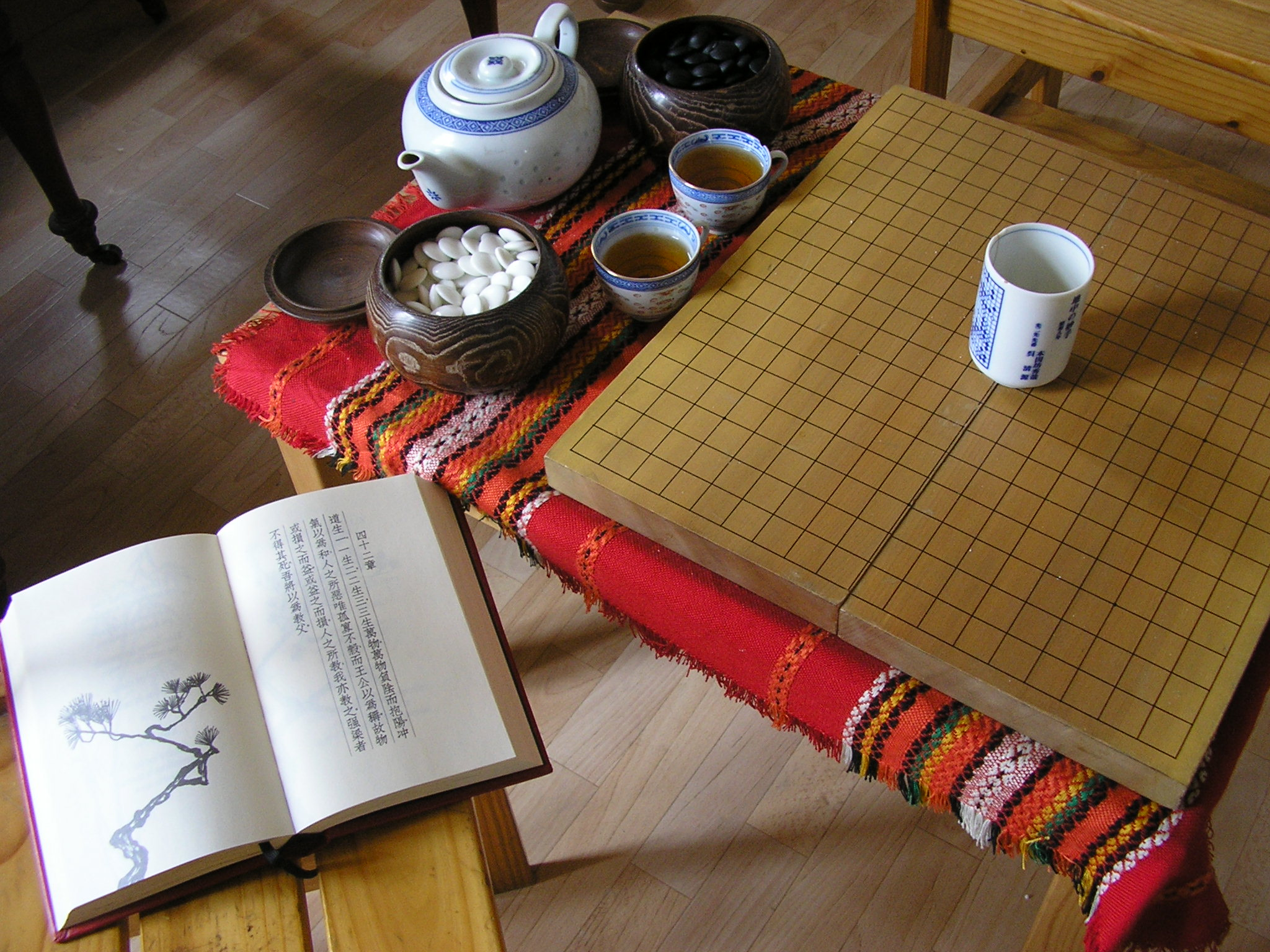
Go portrayed as part of East-Asian culture. (The goblet in the middle is from the Nihon Ki-in.)

It is possible to play Go with a simple paper board and coins, plastic tokens, or white beans and coffee beans for the stones; or even by drawing the stones on the board and erasing them when captured. More popular midrange equipment includes cardstock, a laminated particle board, or wood boards with stones of plastic or glass. More expensive traditional materials are still used by many players. The most expensive Go sets have black stones carved from slate and white stones carved from translucent white shells (traditionally Meretrix lamarckii), played on boards carved in a single piece from the trunk of a tree.

=== Traditional equipment ===
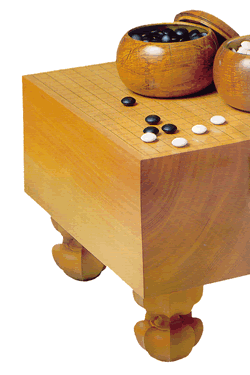
A traditional Japanese set, with a solid wooden floor board (碁盤 goban), 2 bowls (碁笥 goke) and 361 stones (碁石 goishi)

==== Boards ====
The Go board (generally referred to by its Japanese name goban 碁盤) typically measures between 45 and 48 cm (18 and 19 in) in length (from one player's side to the other) and 42 to 44 cm (16 1/2 to 17 1/4 in) in width. Chinese boards are slightly larger, as a traditional Chinese Go stone is slightly larger to match. The board is not square; there is a 15:14 ratio in length to width, because with a perfectly square board, from the player's viewing angle the perspective creates a foreshortening of the board. The added length compensates for this. There are two main types of boards: a table board similar in most respects to other gameboards like that used for chess, and a floor board, which is its own free-standing table and at which the players sit.

The traditional Japanese goban is between 10 and 18 cm (3.9 and 7.1 in) thick and has legs; it sits on the floor (see picture). It is preferably made from the rare golden-tinged Kaya tree (Torreya nucifera), with the very best made from Kaya trees up to 700 years old. More recently, the related California Torreya (Torreya californica) has been prized for its light color and pale rings as well as its reduced expense and more readily available stock. The natural resources of Japan have been unable to keep up with the enormous demand for the slow-growing Kaya trees; both T. nucifera and T. californica take many hundreds of years to grow to the necessary size, and they are now extremely rare, raising the price of such equipment tremendously. As Kaya trees are a protected species in Japan, they cannot be harvested until they have died. Thus, an old-growth, floor-standing Kaya goban can easily cost in excess of $10,000 with the highest-quality examples costing more than $60,000.

Other, less expensive woods often used to make quality table boards in both Chinese and Japanese dimensions include Hiba (Thujopsis dolabrata), Katsura (Cercidiphyllum japonicum), kauri (Agathis), and Shin Kaya (various varieties of spruce, commonly from Alaska, Siberia and China's Yunnan Province). So-called Shin Kaya is a potentially confusing merchant's term: shin means 'new', and thus shin kaya is best translated 'faux kaya', because the woods so described are biologically unrelated to Kaya. Table boards can be one-piece or two-piece; two-piece boards can be hinged to fold for easier storage, but properly spacing the hinge can cause gaps in the center of the board affecting appearance and play. Alternately, pegs, biscuits or mortise and tenon joints allow the board's halves to be more precisely joined while still able to be separated.

For tournament and casual play, goban are also commonly made of leather/suede, vinyl, neoprene-backed cloth (similar to mousepads), silicone or other flexible materials. These boards are much less expensive than their wood counterparts, and also allow the board to be easily rolled or folded for storage and transport, with some materials also affording some resistance to the board being jostled during play. The primary tradeoff is the difference in feel and sound when placing a stone on the softer material; the satisfying "clack" of a punctuated move is absent.

==== Stones ====
A full set of Go stones (goishi) usually contains 181 black stones and 180 white ones; a 19×19 grid has 361 points, so there are enough stones to cover the board, and Black gets the extra odd stone because that player goes first. However it may happen, especially in beginners' games, that many back-and-forth captures empty the bowls before the end of the game: in that case an exchange of prisoners allows the game to continue.

Traditional Japanese stones are double-convex, and made of clamshell (white) and slate (black). The classic slate is nachiguro stone mined in Wakayama Prefecture and the clamshell from the Hamaguri clam (Meretrix lusoria) or the Korean hard clam; however, due to a scarcity in the Japanese supply of these clams, the stones are most often made of shells harvested from Mexico. Historically, the most prized stones were made of jade, often given to the reigning emperor as a gift.

In China, the game is traditionally played with single-convex stones made of a composite called Yunzi. The material comes from Yunnan Province and is made by sintering a proprietary and trade-secret mixture of mineral compounds derived from the local stone. This process dates to the Tang dynasty and, after the knowledge was lost in the 1920s during the Chinese Civil War, was rediscovered in the 1960s by the now state-run Yunzi company. The material is praised for its colors, its pleasing sound as compared to glass or to synthetics such as melamine, and its lower cost as opposed to other materials such as slate/shell. The term yunzi can also refer to a single-convex stone made of any material; however, most English-language Go suppliers specify Yunzi as a material and single-convex as a shape to avoid confusion, as stones made of Yunzi are also available in double-convex while synthetic stones can be either shape.

Traditional stones are made so that black stones are slightly larger in diameter than white; this is to compensate for the optical illusion created by contrasting colors that would make equal-sized white stones appear larger on the board than black stones. (Note: See Overshoot in Western typography for similar subtle adjustment to create a uniform appearance.)

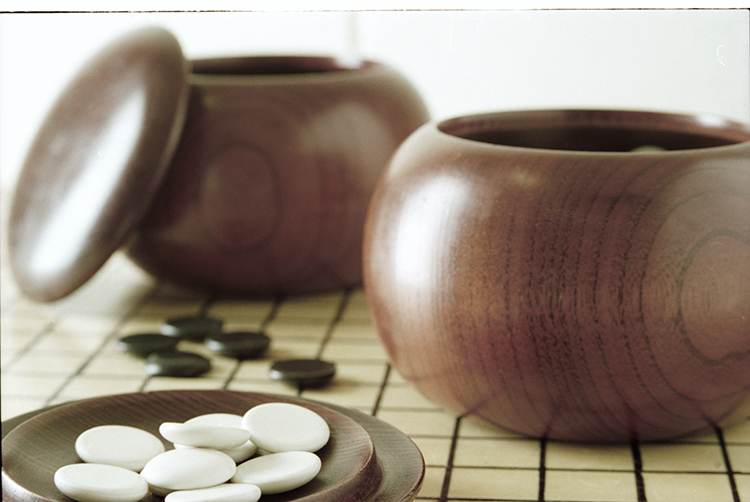
An example of single-convex stones and Go Seigen bowls. These particular stones are made of Yunzi material, and the bowls of jujube wood.

==== Bowls ====
The bowls for the stones are shaped like a flattened sphere with a level underside. The lid is loose fitting and upturned before play to receive stones captured during the game. Chinese bowls are slightly larger, and a little more rounded, a style known generally as Go Seigen; Japanese Kitani bowls tend to have a shape closer to that of the bowl of a snifter glass, such as for brandy. The bowls are usually made of turned wood. Mulberry is the traditional material for Japanese bowls, but is very expensive; wood from the Chinese jujube date tree, which has a lighter color (it is often stained) and slightly more visible grain pattern, is a common substitute for rosewood, and traditional for Go Seigen-style bowls. Other traditional materials used for making Chinese bowls include lacquered wood, ceramics, stone and woven straw or rattan. The names of the bowl shapes, Go Seigen and Kitani, were introduced in the last quarter of the 20th century by the professional player Janice Kim as homage to two 20th-century professional Go players by the same names, of Chinese and Japanese nationality, respectively, who are referred to as the "Fathers of modern Go".

=== Playing technique and etiquette ===
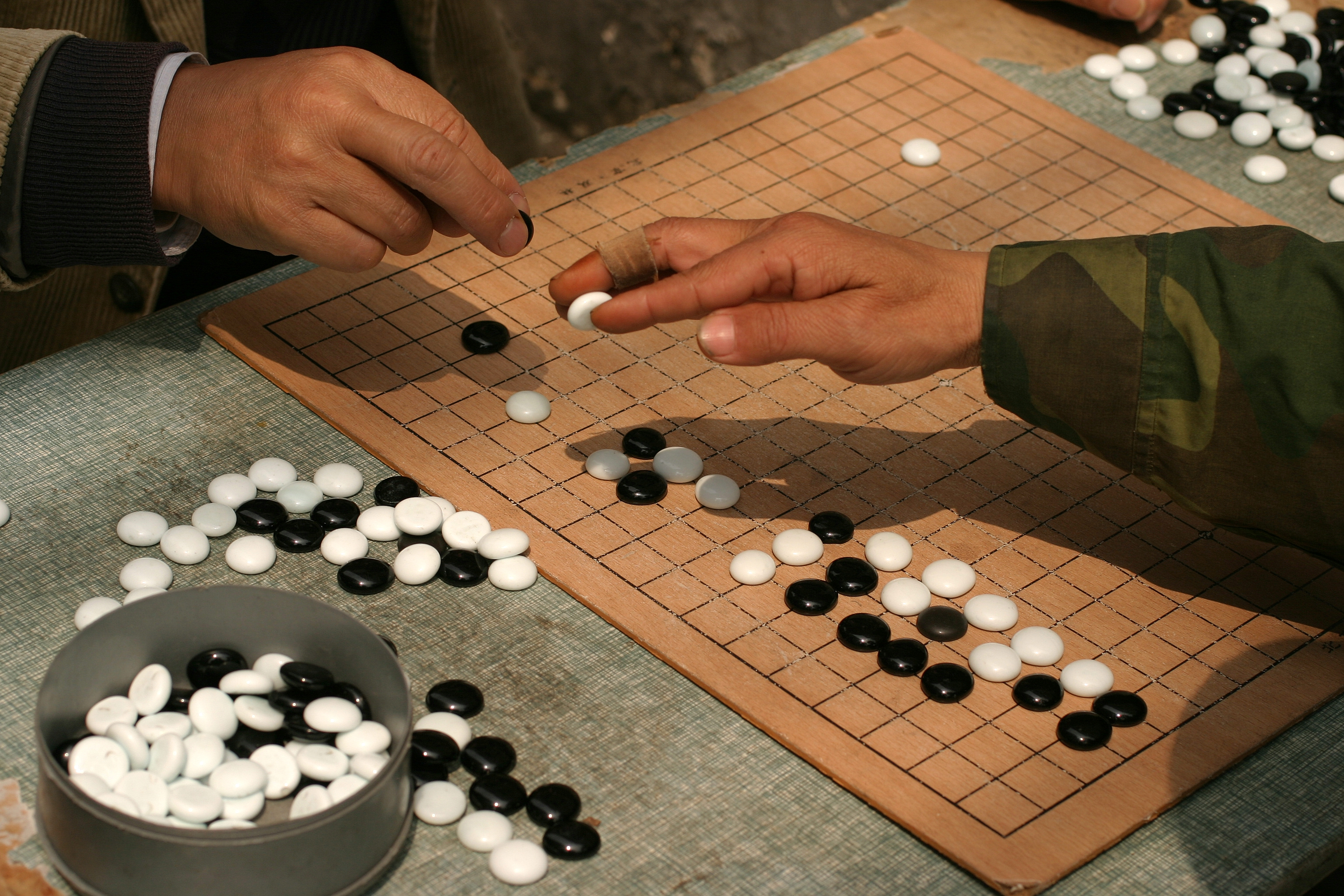
Go players demonstrating the traditional technique of holding a stone

The traditional way to place a Go stone is to first take one from the bowl, gripping it between the index and middle fingers, with the middle finger on top, and then placing it directly on the desired intersection. One can also place a stone on the board and then slide it into position under appropriate circumstances (where it does not move any other stones). It is considered respectful towards White for Black to place the first stone of the game in the upper right-hand corner. (Because of symmetry, this has no effect on the game's outcome.)

It is considered poor manners to run one's fingers through one's bowl of unplayed stones, as the sound, however soothing to the player doing this, can be disturbing to one's opponent. Similarly, clacking a stone against another stone, the board, or the table or floor is also discouraged. However, it is permissible to emphasize select moves by striking the board more firmly than normal, thus producing a sharp clack. Additionally, hovering one's arm over the board (usually when deciding where to play) is also considered rude as it obstructs the opponent's view of the board.

Manners and etiquette are extensively discussed in 'The Classic of WeiQi in Thirteen Chapters', a Song dynasty manual to the game. Apart from the points above it also points to the need to remain calm and honorable, in maintaining posture, and knowing the key specialised terms, such as titles of common formations. Generally speaking, much attention is paid to the etiquette of playing, as much as to winning or actual game technique.

== Computers and Go ==
=== Software players ===
Go long posed a daunting challenge to computer programmers, putting forward "difficult decision-making tasks, an intractable search space, and an optimal solution so complex it appears infeasible to directly approximate using a policy or value function". Prior to 2015, the best Go programs only managed to reach amateur dan level. On smaller 9×9 and 13x13 boards, computer programs fared better, and were able to compare to professional players. Many in the field of artificial intelligence consider Go to require more elements that mimic human thought than chess.

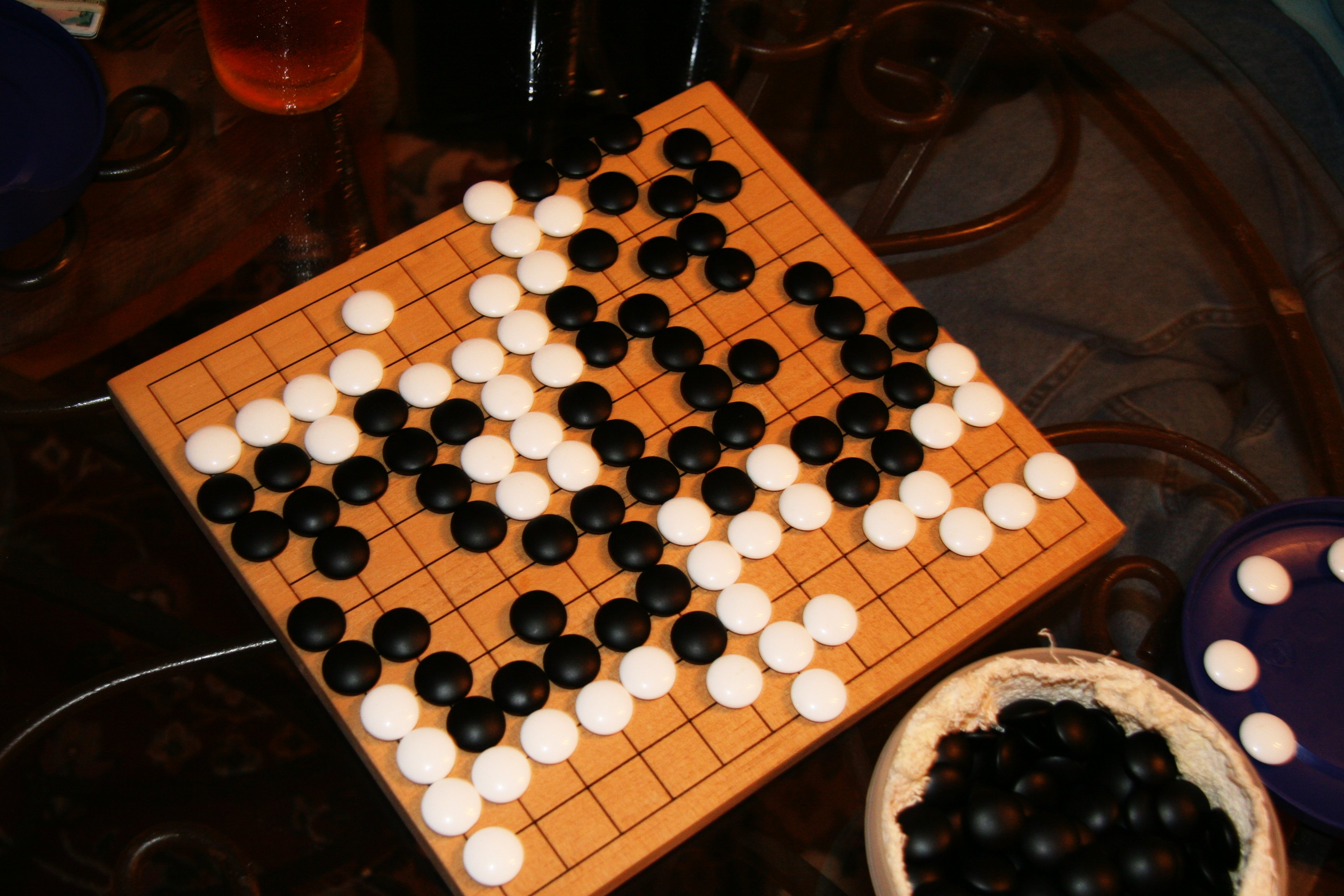
A finished beginner's game on a 13×13 board

The reasons why computer programs had not played Go at the professional dan level prior to 2016 include:

- The number of spaces on the board is much larger (over five times the number of spaces on a chess board—361 vs. 64). On most turns there are many more possible moves in Go than in chess. Throughout most of the game, the number of legal moves stays at around 150–250 per turn, and rarely falls below 100 (in chess, the average number of moves is 37). Because an exhaustive computer program for Go must calculate and compare every possible legal move in each ply (player turn), its ability to calculate the best plays is sharply reduced when there are a large number of possible moves. Most computer game algorithms, such as those for chess, compute several moves in advance. Given an average of 200 available moves through most of the game, for a computer to calculate its next move by exhaustively anticipating the next four moves of each possible play (two of its own and two of its opponent's), it would have to consider more than 320 billion (3.2×10^{11}) possible combinations. To exhaustively calculate the next eight moves, would require computing 512 quintillion (5.12×10^{20}) possible combinations. As of March 2014, the most powerful supercomputer in the world, NUDT's "Tianhe-2", can sustain 33.86 petaflops. At this rate, even given an exceedingly low estimate of 10 operations required to assess the value of one play of a stone, Tianhe-2 would require four hours to assess all possible combinations of the next eight moves in order to make a single play.
- The placement of a single stone in the initial phase can affect the play of the game a hundred or more moves later. A computer would have to predict this influence, and it would be unworkable to attempt to exhaustively analyze the next hundred moves.
- In capture-based games (such as chess), a position can often be evaluated relatively easily, such as by calculating who has a material advantage or more active pieces. (Note: While chess position evaluation is simpler than Go position evaluation, it is still more complicated than simply calculating material advantage or piece activity; pawn structure and king safety matter, as do the possibilities in further play. The complexity of the algorithm differs per engine.) In Go, there is often no easy way to evaluate a position. However a 6-kyu human can evaluate a position at a glance, to see which player has more territory, and even beginners can estimate the score within 10 points, given time to count it. The number of stones on the board (material advantage) is only a weak indicator of the strength of a position, and a territorial advantage (more empty points surrounded) for one player might be compensated by the opponent's strong positions and influence all over the board. Normally a 3-dan can easily judge most of these positions.

It was not until August 2008 that a computer won a game against a professional level player at a handicap of 9 stones, the greatest handicap normally given to a weaker opponent. It was the Mogo program, which scored this first victory in an exhibition game played during the US Go Congress. By 2013, a win at the professional level of play was accomplished with a four-stone advantage. In October 2015, Google DeepMind's program AlphaGo beat Fan Hui, the European Go champion and a 2 dan (out of 9 dan possible) professional, five times out of five with no handicap on a full size 19×19 board. AlphaGo used a fundamentally different paradigm than earlier Go programs; it included very little direct instruction, and mostly used deep learning where AlphaGo played itself in hundreds of millions of games such that it could measure positions more intuitively. In March 2016, Google next challenged Lee Sedol, a 9 dan considered the top player in the world in the early 21st century, to a five-game match. Leading up to the game, Lee Sedol and other top professionals were confident that he would win; however, AlphaGo defeated Lee in four of the five games. After having already lost the series by the third game, Lee won the fourth game, describing his win as "invaluable". In May 2017, AlphaGo beat Ke Jie, who at the time continuously held the world No. 1 ranking for two years, winning each game in a three-game match during the Future of Go Summit. In October 2017, DeepMind announced a significantly stronger version called AlphaGo Zero which beat the previous version by 100 games to 0.

In February 2023, Kellin Pelrine, an amateur American Go player, won 14 out of 15 games against a top-ranked AI system in a significant victory over artificial intelligence. Pelrine took advantage of a previously unknown flaw in the Go computer program, which had been identified by another computer. He exploited this weakness by slowly encircling the opponent's stones and distracting the AI with moves in other parts of the board.

=== Software assistance ===
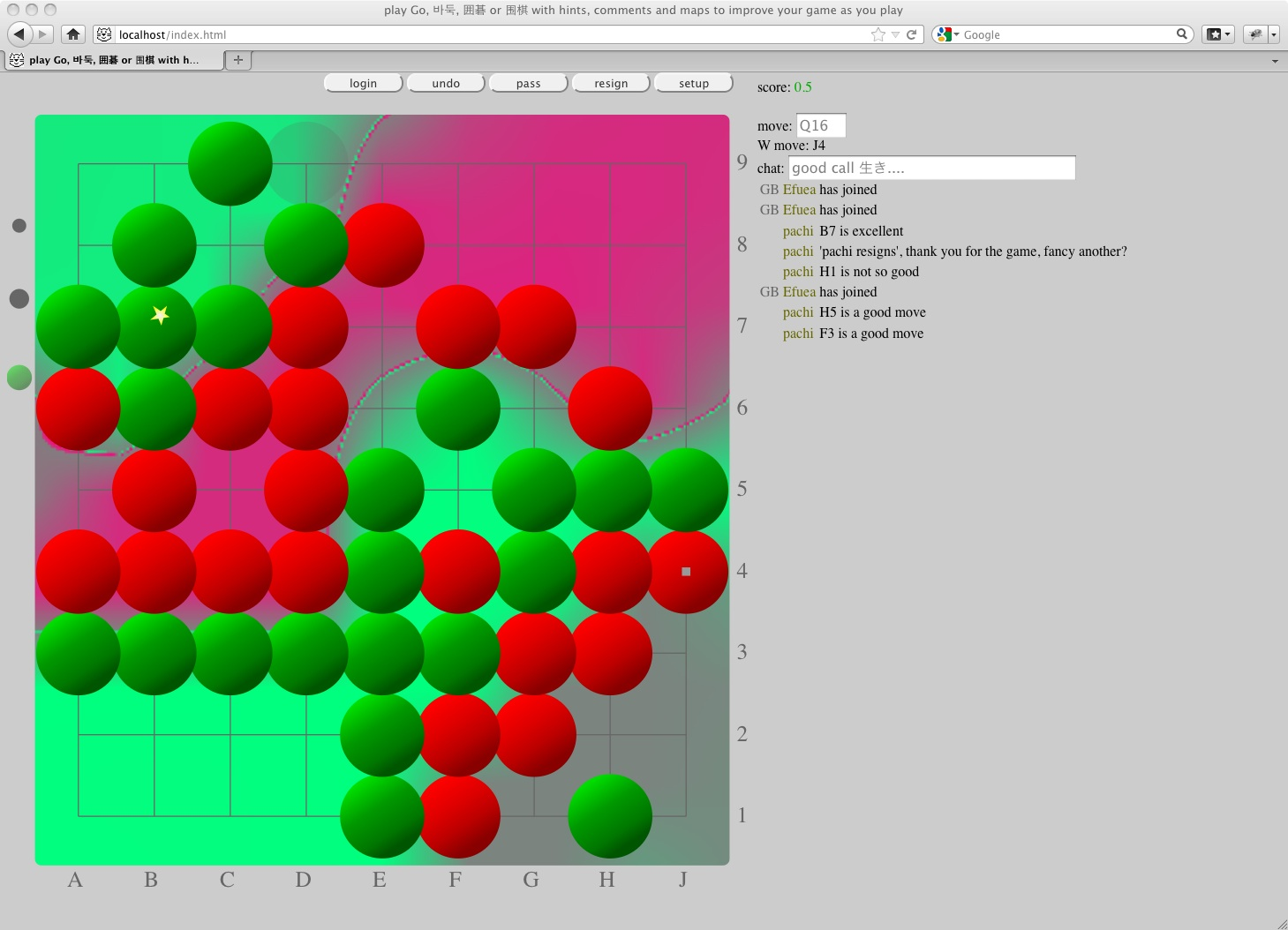
A 9×9 game with graphical aids. Colors and markings show evaluations by the computer assistant.

An abundance of software is available to support players of the game. This includes programs that can be used to view or edit game records and diagrams, programs that allow the user to search for patterns in the games of strong players, and programs that allow users to play against each other over the Internet.

There are several file formats used to store game records, the most popular of which is SGF, short for Smart Game Format. Programs used for editing game records allow the user to record not only the moves, but also variations, commentary and further information on the game. (Note: Lists of such programs may be found at Sensei's Library or GoBase.)

Electronic databases can be used to study life and death situations, joseki, fuseki and games by a particular player. Programs are available that give players pattern searching options, which allow players to research positions by searching for high-level games in which similar situations occur. Such software generally lists common follow-up moves that have been played by professionals and gives statistics on win–loss ratio in opening situations.

Internet-based Go servers allow access to competition with players all over the world, for real-time and turn-based games. (Note: Lists of Go servers are kept at Sensei's Library and the AGA website) Such servers also allow easy access to professional teaching, with both teaching games and interactive game review being possible. (Note: The British Go Association provides a list of teaching services)

== In popular culture ==
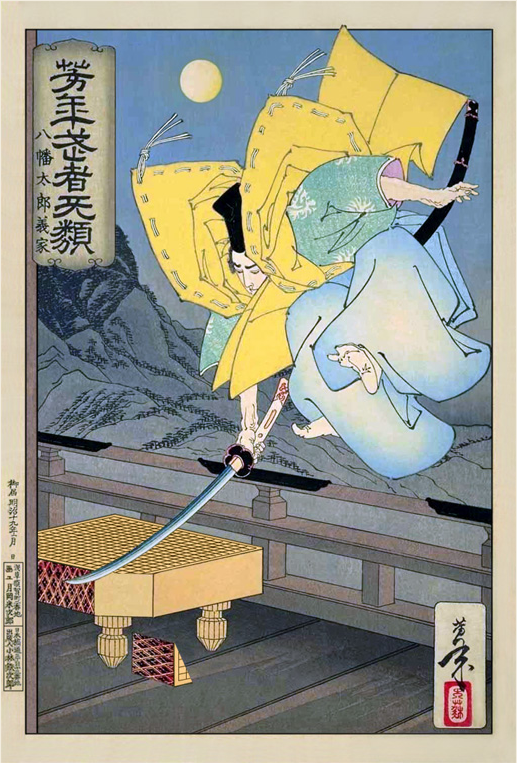
Minamoto no Yoshiie by Tsukioka Yoshitoshi, 1886. This popular woodblock print depicts the ancient legend of a husband who suspected his wife was having an affair with the samurai Minamoto no Yoshiie. To prevent his visits, the husband surrounded his house with brambles and placed a Go board on the balcony, hoping he would stumble over it. Instead, the samurai deftly cut the board as he leaped over the balcony railing, avoiding both obstacles.

Apart from technical literature and study material, Go and its strategies have been the subject of several works of fiction, such as The Master of Go by Nobel Prize in Literature-winning author Yasunari Kawabata (Note: A list of books can be found at Sensei's Library) and The Girl Who Played Go (2001) by Shan Sa. Other books have used Go as a theme or minor plot device. For example, the 1979 novel Shibumi by Trevanian centers around the game and uses Go metaphors. In the novel Playground (2024) by Richard Powers, two of the main protagonists bond over their love of games, especially Go. Go features prominently in the Chung Kuo series of novels by David Wingrove, being the favourite game of the main villain.

The manga series Hikaru no Go and its anime adaptation, first released in Japan in 1998 and 2001 respectively, had a large impact in popularizing Go among young players, both in Japan and—as translations were released—abroad.

Similarly, Go has been used as a subject or plot device in film, such as Pi (π), A Beautiful Mind, Tron: Legacy, Knives Out, and The Go Master (a biopic of Go professional Go Seigen). (Note: A list of films can be found at the EGF Internet Go Filmography) 2013's Tôkyô ni kita bakari or Tokyo Newcomer portrays a Chinese foreigner Go player moving to Tokyo. In King Hu's wuxia film The Valiant Ones, the characters are color-coded as Go stones (black or other dark shades for the Chinese, white for the Japanese invaders), Go boards and stones are used by the characters to keep track of soldiers prior to battle, and the battles themselves are structured like a game of Go.

Go has also been featured as a plot device in a number of television series. Examples include Starz's science fiction thriller Counterpart, which is rich in references (the opening itself featuring developments on a Go board), and includes Go matches, accurately played, relevant to the plot. Also, in 2024 Netflix released the historical-fictional Korean series Captivating the King.

The corporation and brand Atari was named after the Go term, atari.

Hedge fund manager Mark Spitznagel used Go as his main investing metaphor in his investing book The Dao of Capital. The Way of Go: 8 Ancient Strategy Secrets for Success in Business and Life by Troy Anderson applies Go strategy to business. GO: An Asian Paradigm for Business Strategy by Miura Yasuyuki, a manager with Japan Airlines, uses Go to describe the thinking and behavior of business men.

== Psychological perspectives ==
A 2004 review of literature by Fernand Gobet, de Voogt and Jean Retschitzki showed that relatively little scientific research had been carried out on the psychology of Go, compared with other traditional board games such as chess. Computer Go research has shown that given the large search tree, knowledge and pattern recognition are more important in Go than in other strategy games, such as chess. A study of the effects of age on Go-playing has shown that mental decline is milder with strong players than with weaker players. According to the review of Gobet and colleagues, the pattern of brain activity observed with techniques such as PET and fMRI does not show large differences between Go and chess. On the other hand, a study by Xiangchuan Chen et al. showed greater activation in the right hemisphere among Go players than among chess players, but the research was inconclusive because strong players from Go were hired while very weak chess players were hired in the original study. There is some evidence to suggest a correlation between playing board games and reduced risk of Alzheimer's disease and dementia.

Arthur Mary, a French researcher in clinical psychopathology, reports on his psychotherapeutic approaches using the game of Go with patients in private practice and in a psychiatric ward. Drawing on neuroscience research and employing a psychoanalytic (Lacanian) and phenomenological approach, he demonstrates how drives are expressed on the goban. He offers some suggestions to therapists for defining ways of playing Go that lead to therapeutic effects.

== Analyses of the game ==
In formal game theory terms, Go is a non-chance, combinatorial game with perfect information. Informally that means there are no dice used (and decisions or moves create discrete outcome vectors rather than probability distributions), the underlying math is combinatorial, and all moves (via single vertex analysis) are visible to both players (unlike some card games where some information is hidden). Perfect information also implies sequence—players can theoretically know about all past moves.

Other theoretical taxonomy elements include:

- Go is bounded by a finite number of moves and every game must end with a victor or a tie (although ties are impossible in most rulesets).
- The strategy is associative because every strategy is a function of board position.
- The format is non-cooperative (that is, it's not a team sport).
- Positions are extensible, and so can be represented by board position trees.
- The game is zero-sum because player choices do not increase resources available, the rewards in the game are fixed and if one player wins, the other loses, and the utility function is restricted (in the sense of win/lose).
- However, ratings, monetary rewards, national and personal pride and other factors can extend utility functions, but generally not to the extent of removing the win/lose restriction, although affine transformations can theoretically add non-zero and complex utility aspects even to two player games.

In the endgame, it can often happen that the state of the board consists of several subpositions that do not interact with the others. The whole board position can then be considered as a mathematical sum, or composition, of the individual subpositions. It is this property of Go endgames that led John Horton Conway to the discovery of surreal numbers.

In combinatorial game theory terms, Go is a zero-sum, perfect-information, partisan, deterministic strategy game, putting it in the same class as chess, draughts (checkers), and Reversi (Othello).

The game emphasizes the importance of balance on multiple levels: to secure an area of the board, it is good to play moves close together; however, to cover the largest area, one needs to spread out, perhaps leaving weaknesses that can be exploited. Playing too low (close to the edge) secures insufficient territory and influence, yet playing too high (far from the edge) allows the opponent to invade. Decisions in one part of the board may be influenced by an apparently unrelated situation in a distant part of the board (for example, ladders can be broken by stones at an arbitrary distance away). Plays made early in the game can shape the nature of conflict a hundred moves later.

The game complexity of Go is such that describing even elementary strategy fills many introductory books. In fact, numerical estimates show that the number of possible games of Go far exceeds the number of atoms in the observable universe. (Note: It has been said that the number of board positions is at most 3^{361} (about 10^{172}) since each position can be white, black, or vacant. Ignoring (illegal) suicide moves, there are at least 361! games (about 10^{768}) since every permutation of the 361 points corresponds to a game. See Go and mathematics for more details, which includes much larger estimates. This estimate, however, is inexact for two reasons: first, both contestants usually agree to end the game long before every point has been played; second, after a capture it may happen that an already played point is played again, even repetitively so in the case of a kō-battle.)

Go also contributed to the development of combinatorial game theory (with Go infinitesimals being a specific example of its use in Go).

== Comparisons to other games ==
Go begins with an empty board. It is focused on building from the ground up (nothing to something) with multiple, simultaneous battles leading to a point-based win. Chess is tactical rather than strategic, as the predetermined strategy is to trap one individual piece (the king). This comparison has also been applied to military and political history, with Scott Boorman's book The Protracted Game (1969) and, more recently, Robert Greene's book The 48 Laws of Power (1998) exploring the strategy of the Chinese Communist Party in the Chinese Civil War through the lens of Go.

A similar comparison has been drawn among Go, chess and backgammon, perhaps the three oldest games that enjoy worldwide popularity. Backgammon is a "man vs. fate" contest, with chance playing a strong role in determining the outcome. Chess, with rows of soldiers marching forward to capture each other, embodies the conflict of "man vs. man". Because the handicap system tells Go players where they stand relative to other players, an honestly ranked player can expect to lose about half of their games; therefore, Go can be seen as embodying the quest for self-improvement, "man vs. self".

== See also ==
- List of books about Go
- List of world Go champions
- Pair Go
- Sensei's Library
