= Go equipment =

Game equipment used in go

The equipment required to play the game of Go consists of the board, stones (playing pieces) and containers for the stones. The quality and materials used in making Go equipment varies considerably, and the cost varies accordingly.

== History ==
The oldest known surviving Go equipment includes several boards recovered through archaeological excavation, showing that early boards were smaller than the modern 19×19 grid: a 13×13 board from the Liao dynasty, discovered in 1977 in Mongolia; a 17×17 board from the Han dynasty, discovered in 1954 in Wang-Du, Hebei province; and a 19×19 board from the Sui dynasty, also discovered in 1954, in An Yang, Hunan province. Boards with an odd number of lines were traditionally preferred, both because this eliminates the possibility of a tied central point and because early games began with stones placed at the centre of the board. Other examples of ancient equipment can be found in museums in Japan and Korea.

== Equipment ==
=== Board ===
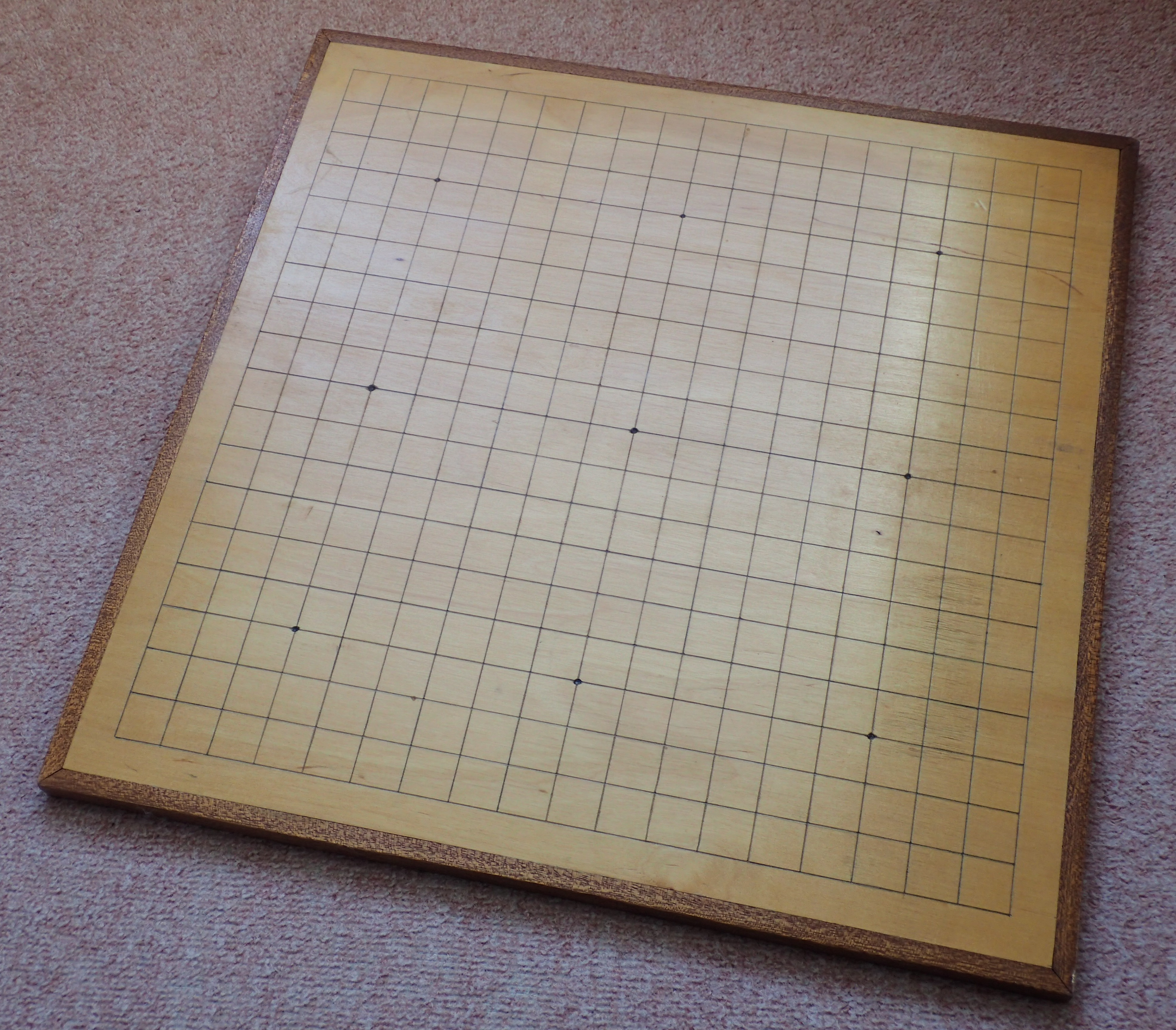
An empty Go board, marked with the 19×19 grid and 9 star points

The Go board, called the goban 碁盤 in Japanese, is the playing surface on which to place the stones. The standard board is marked with a 19×19 grid. Smaller boards include a 13×13 grid and a 9×9 grid used for shorter games that are often used to teach beginners. Some 19×19 boards have a 13×13 grid on the reverse side. 17×17 was used in historical times. Chinese boards are generally square; Japanese and Korean boards are slightly longer than wide, so that they appear square when viewed from a normal playing position. In Asian Go parlors, the tables are slightly lower than the typical game table so that the players can clearly see the positions of the stones.

Traditional Japanese goban usually follow the dimensions:

	mm	inch	Japanese units
Board width	424.2	16 23/32	1.4 shaku 尺
Board length	454.5	17 29/32	1.5 shaku 尺
Board thickness	151.5	5 31/32	0.5 shaku 尺
Line spacing width-wise	22	7/8	7.26 bu 分
Line spacing length-wise	23.7	15/16	7.82 bu 分
Line thickness	1	1/32	0.3 bu 分
Star point marker diameter	4	5/32	1.2 bu 分
Stone diameter	22.5	29/32	7.5 bu 分

(1 inch = 25.4 mm; 1 shaku = 100 bu = 303 mm)

Go boards fall into several types or styles.

- Economical boards comprise paper, plastic, or laminate, which can easily be folded away and stored. They are often used by beginners or for when one does not have a proper set available. A board can be hand-drawn on a stiff piece of cardboard for the super-economical.
- Boards that comprise fabric, paper, or plastic may be rolled into a tube and easily carried along with stones to make a portable set. Some materials hold strongly onto the warp though and need to be weighted at the corners to make the board usable when unrolled.
- Magnetic sets are also available, which comprise metal boards and stones that include magnets. They are useful for traveling. Large magnetic boards are also available for demonstration purposes, during lectures and other presentations.

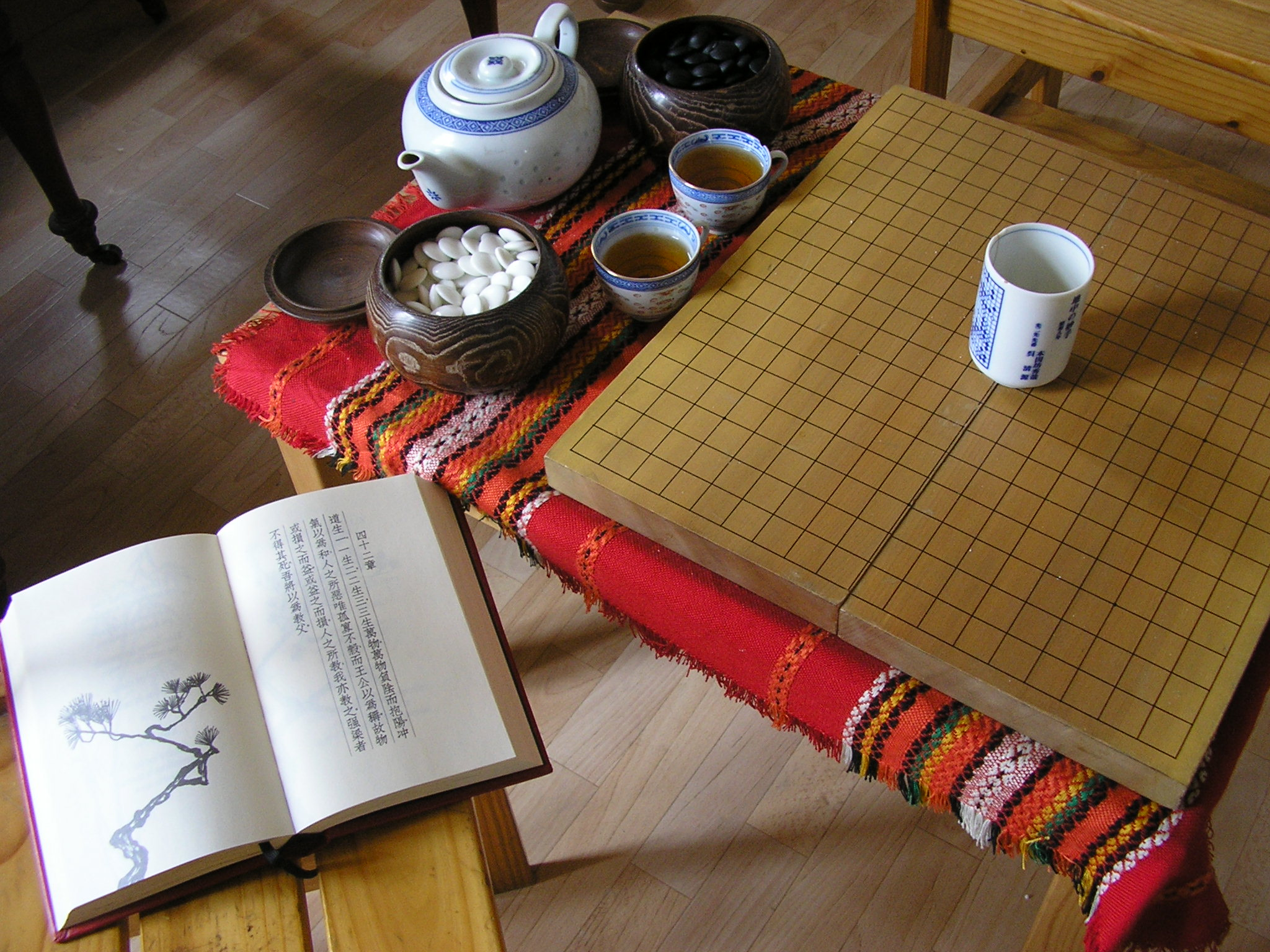
A typical folding board, with Go bowls and stones next to it

- Wooden boards, one to two inches thick, are commonly used. They are known as "table boards" because they are placed on tables (compare "floor board" below.) The wood grain is pleasing to the eye, and the stones make a nice sound when placed firmly on the board. Portable boards can be made with hinges or slots. Some have grids on the reverse. Boards have been made from almost every type of wood, which includes particle board with or without veneer. Wood, such as spruce or katsura 桂, that has a light color with a fine grain that does not compete with the grid lines is considered most suitable. The most valued boards are made from kaya, which is a mellow yellow. Also available are bamboo boards. The tensile strength of bamboo is comparable to that of steel making it very durable but also heavier than other wooden boards of the same size.
- A wooden floor board with legs is the most traditional, elegant, and expensive of all boards. Historically, to play on these boards, the Japanese would sit on tatami mats. The legs are carved to resemble gardenias. These boards are still used for important tournament games in Asia. Chinese versions of floor boards are not always made from blocks of wood, and more closely resemble a small table with an inlaid go board. The legs raise the board to the correct height. The board can range from 14 to 30 cm high. The thickest boards are the most elegant. The undersides often have a square recesses (heso) to prevent warping and to amplify the sounds of the stones hitting the surface. These are classified according to the quality of the wood grain. Itame refers to a bent or irregular grain; masame refers to consistent grain that runs straight across the top of the board. Masame boards are further classified as tenmasa (the top grain is straight, but grain along the cut end is curved), and most-prized tenchimasa (grain is straight along the cut end as well as on top.) Prices of kaya boards range from US$1,000 to $20,000 plus. Traditional boards made of other woods, such as Alaskan spruce, Agathis, or katsura are cheaper, starting at around $200.

==== Care of boards ====
Wooden boards subjected to excessive humidity or a large variation of humidity or temperature may be affected by discoloration, warping, cracking, woodworm, or mold, and prolonged exposure to sunlight can bleach the board. Boards transported between climates with significantly differing humidity levels may be subjected to warping or cracking due to rapidly changing moisture content in the wood.

=== Stones ===
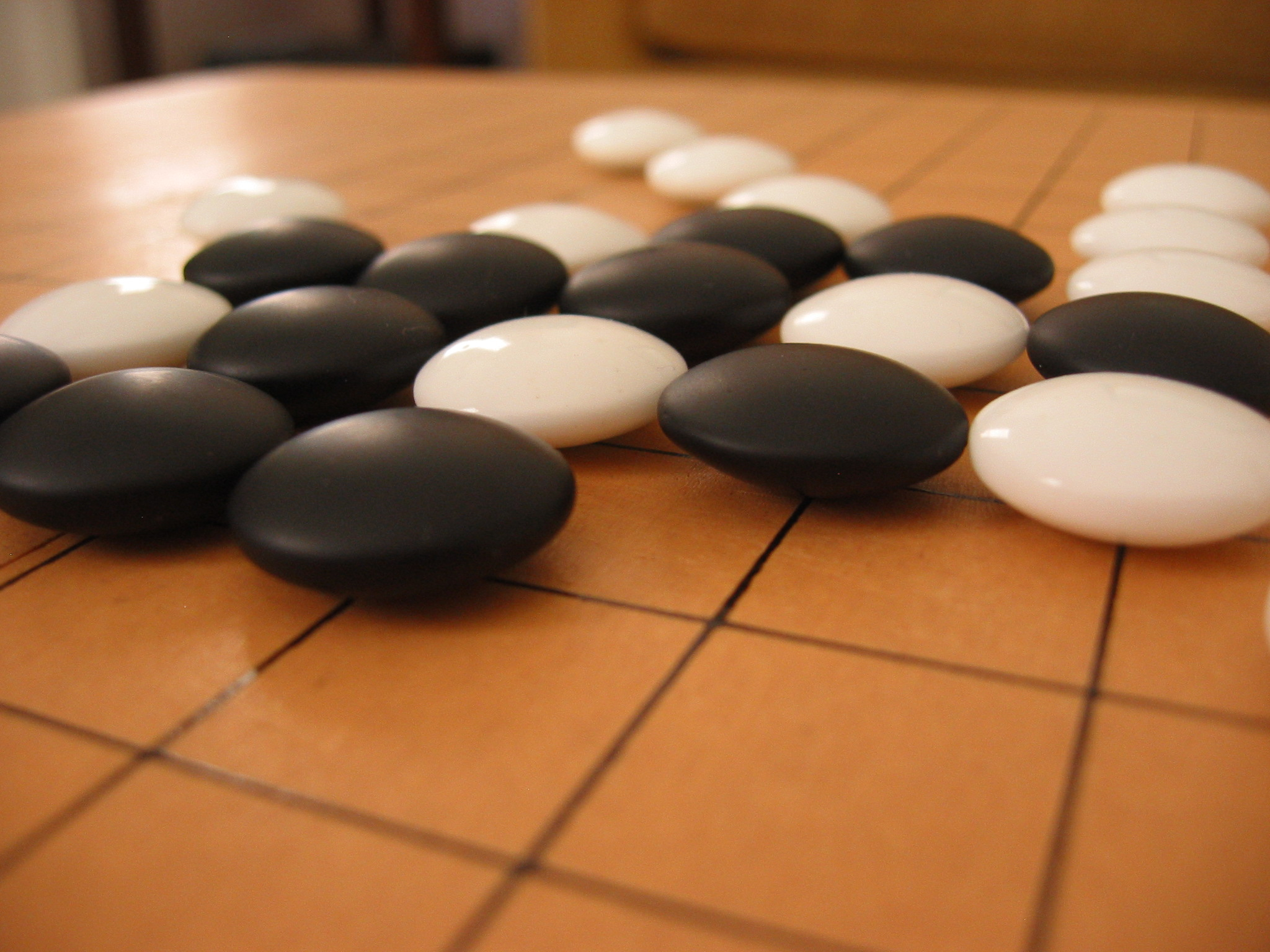
Glass Go stones

Go stones, or go-ishi 碁石,棋子, are round objects placed on the board. They are colored either black or white and normally number 181 for black and 180 for white (or sometimes 180 for each).

There are two styles or shapes of stones:

- The Japanese and Korean style, which is lens shaped (i.e. biconvex). This is the most popular style.
- The Chinese style stones are normally flat underneath and convex on top. This style is less common outside of China. Flat bottom stones can be useful for post-game analysis; by placing stones upside down, players can easily keep track of which stones were part of the original game. However, they are harder to pick up when clearing them from the board.

The material varies. Some stones are made out of plastic, glass, porcelain or marble, but the traditional Japanese and Korean stones are made out of slate for black and clamshell for white. Chinese style stones can be made of glass or yunzi.

==== Stone dimensions ====
Stone thickness can also vary, from as low as 4 millimeters or as high as 12.8 millimeters, with most between 7.0 mm and 10.1 mm for biconvex and 5–7 mm for single convex. Thick slate and shell stones can last for generations, slowly becoming thinner from handling, and gradually acquiring an ivory-like patina. The diameter of the stones is standardized to around 22 mm ±1 mm, which can fit almost all Go boards. Black stones are slightly larger in diameter to compensate for optical illusion of the white stones appearing larger when placed with black stones of the same diameter. This mostly applies to Korean and Japanese stones – Chinese stones tend to be sometimes larger in diameter, but they do come in different standard sizes. A Chinese "large" size is about 23 mm in diameter while "medium" is about 22 mm. Chinese board dimensions are also accordingly larger to accommodate them. See also some comparative measurements of various go stone sets.

For the most expensive clamshell and slate Go stones, stone thickness is carefully controlled and ranked according to size. Typical stone sizes are size 25 (7.0 mm thick) to size 37 (10.4 mm), and even thicker stones are available for a correspondingly much higher price. Commonly used shell and slate Go stone thicknesses are size 32 (8.8 mm) and size 33 (9.2 mm) for most individuals and size 36 (10.1 mm) for professionals. Stones thicker than 10.1 mm are difficult to place on the board, while many Go players prefer stones that are 8.8 and 9.2 mm thick, considering these the optimum thickness for aesthetic and practical reasons.

==== Plastic stones ====
Generally, these are the cheapest stones available. They range from flat, counter shaped to the typical lens shape. Price ranges from around $5–$30.

One specific type of plastic stone is called the Ing stone, manufactured by the Ing Chang-ki Wei-chi Education Foundation. These are the official stones of the Ing Foundation and have some extra weight to them due to metal inserted in the middle of the stone. They are 10 mm thick and sometimes come in an Ing Bowl, which is specially designed to count them (Ing rules require each player to start with exactly 180 stones).

Stones can also be made from Melamine resin. This is a stable compound used in making countertops and other kitchenware and is considered safe.

==== Porcelain stones ====
Porcelain is the least common material for stones.

==== Glass stones ====
Glass stones are the most widely used and most economical. They range from thinner flat-bottomed style, to a symmetrical lens shape. Glass stones have the correct weight and can be grasped with ease. White stones are polished and black ones are buffed to a matte finish, giving a feel somewhat like slate and clam stones. Price ranges from US$15 to $80 for glass stones with bowls. Glass 'gems' at an arts and crafts store are an inexpensive alternative.

==== Slate and clamshell stones ====
These are usually the most expensive material. The black stones are made of slate, while the white stones are made from clamshells. Due to a single clam shell yielding only a limited number of stones (around three), white stones are expensive to produce. The clamshells used to make the white stones used to be farmed from Japan, but since the supply is dwindling, most clamshells are harvested from Baja California in Mexico. These stones have three grades, depending on the stripe or grain pattern of the white stones. All grades use the same uniform black slate stones. Shell stones may also rarely be made out of the giant clam (shako in Japanese) shell, as well as a clam shell that has a slight purple tint. Clamshell stones are cut as cylinders using a diamond coring drill, then professionally ground, sanded, shaped, and polished into the final product. Shell and slate stones are natural products that provide the ultimate in Go stone aesthetics, and even the lowest grade are far more expensive than the common plastic, glass, and ceramic stones. The price for a set of shell and slate stones ranges from US$200 to over $5,000 according to grade, with thicker stones costing progressively more, especially within the Yuki grade.

- Jitsuyo 実用 (practical, standard, or utility-grade) are stones with a coarse grain across the stone, with 7 or 8 wide stripes. The stones are cut near the joint of the shell.
- Tsuki 月 (moon-grade) are stones with a finer grain pattern, with more and thinner stripes covering about 70% of the stone. They are cut around the middle of the shell. These are considered the 'in-between' quality.
- Yuki 雪 (snow-grade) are stones with a uniform, fine, straight grain across the stone, with many fine stripes covering at least 80% of the stone. They are cut from near the edge of the shell. These are considered the best by Japanese tastes, and are the most expensive, considering it is difficult to cut a stone with a great deal of thickness since the edge of the shell is mostly thin. The price ranges from $200 to over $35,000, the thicker stones costing more.

==== Yunzi stones ====
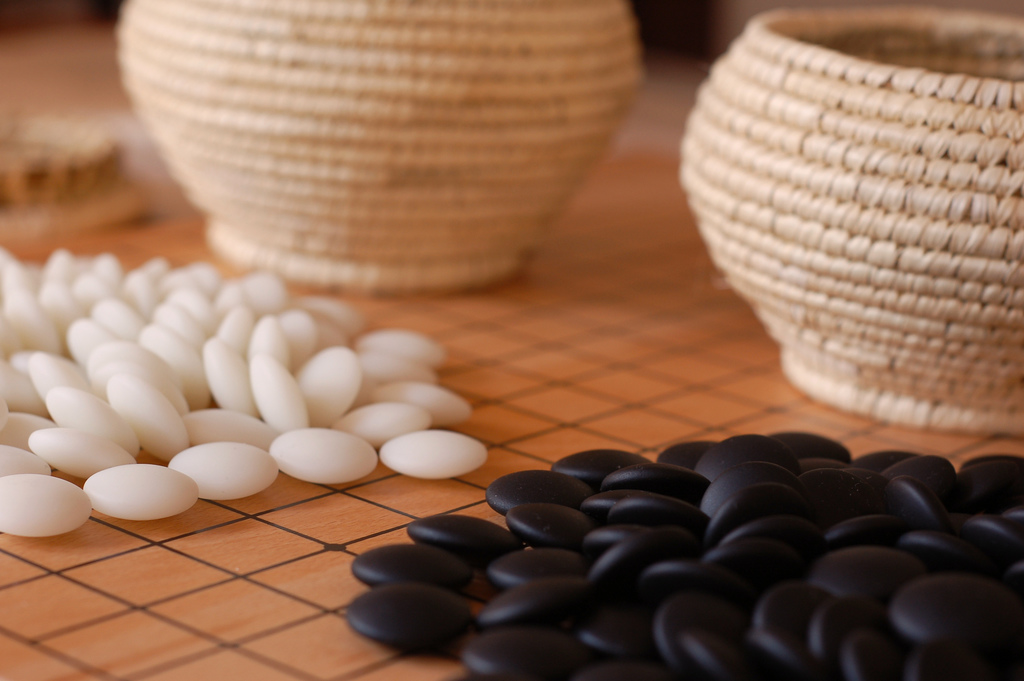
Double convex yunzi stones and woven baskets

Yunzi is a style of stone first produced in the Tang dynasty in China by sintering a trade-secret mixture of mineral compounds including agate (resulting in the slightly yellow-green hue of traditional yunzi stones). The term yunzi traditionally applies to stones made of this material but is also used to refer to any stones of typical Chinese dimensions (slightly larger than Japanese stones) which are convex on only one side.

The process of making yunzi was lost in the 1920s when the Chinese Civil War spread to Yunnan Province; however, in the late 1960s, it was rediscovered by the now state-managed Yunzi Company. The firm claims their stones have the advantage of a pleasant sound when placed on the board. Yunzi are delicately made with a jade-like luster yet are neither brittle nor slippery. The black and white pieces each have their special qualities. The white pieces are opaque with a tint of yellow or green. The black pieces are dark, and when held to the light a translucent green hue. With new technology, yunzi stones can now be made pure white without any discolorations.

==== Stone etiquette ====
When not making a move, one should leave one's stones in the bowl. During the opponent's turn, it is considered rude for players to rattle stones in the bowl. It is also considered improper to hold a handful of stones. The "correct" procedure is to decide upon one's move, then remove one stone from the bowl and place it on the board. This produces the minimal amount of distraction for one's opponent.

When removing a stone from its bowl to make a move, place a flat hand on the edge of the bowl, with the fingers gently entering the bowl. Pick up a stone chopstick-style with the index and middle fingers, holding the stone between the index fingernail and the middle fingertip. The fingers extend almost straight, and the thumb is not tucked in.

When placing the stone, take care that long sleeves are brushed up to avoid knocking stones already played. To place the stone on the board, as soon as the fingertip of index finger is about to reach the surface of the board, it slips to the side, allowing the middle finger to aim the stone down towards the surface and connect (the other fingers and thumb naturally spread outwards). With a little practice a stone can be placed gracefully and forcefully and with a big click. The keys to a loud click are the force of the middle finger and the late release of the stone. Once the stone has been placed, the middle finger and hand slowly lifts off the stone (trying to avoid wobbling the stone) and gently retreats back to the player.

Although it is permissible to place one's stone at times with a loud, satisfying "thwack", one who does so with every move would be considered crude or vulgar. For instance, when submitting to an opponent's threat, a quiet placement is more in keeping with circumstances; probing moves or clever responses may be slid slyly into place. The ability to express oneself in the manner of making a move explains why one of the names for the game is "hand talk" ("shudan" in Japanese, "shoutan" in Chinese).

==== Stone maintenance ====
Standard care of stones (of any variety except slate and clamshell) generally involves washing stones in soapy water to remove oils and chalk by-products from their manufacture or storage protection. New clamshell stones don't require cleaning, while new slate stones should be cleaned of excess mineral oil with a cotton cloth. Go players minimize impact during gameplay, and store stones away from sunlight and heat, sometimes placing a soft cloth in the bottom of the bowl to minimize chipping.

=== Bowls ===
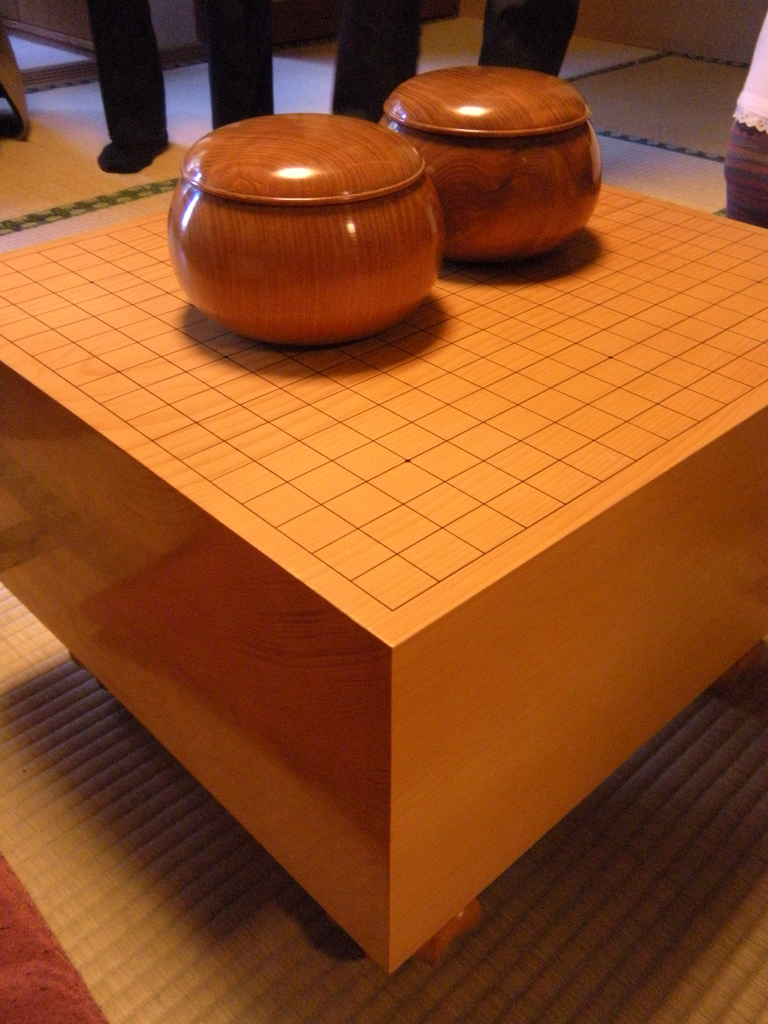
Wooden Go bowls on a Japanese-style floor board

Go bowls, or go-ke are the containers for the stones. Although not strictly needed to play Go, bowls nevertheless play an important role in storing the stones, and captured stones can be placed on the lids. Bowls are identical, with one holding the white stones and one holding the black stones.

A bowl's lid is usually rather loose and not tightly fit. A player traditionally places the lid upside down next to the open bowl and keeps stones there that they have captured from the opponent. The lid is placed so it's easily visible by the opponent, so each player knows how many prisoners the opponent has that have been removed from the playing board.

The Go bowl can be made of several different materials.

- Plastic: Very cheap, they can be cylinder shaped or square shaped. Plastic food storage containers can also be used.
- Straw: Mostly used by the Chinese. They are made of woven straw.
- Wood: The most common material used to make bowls. The type of wood used affects the price considerably. Mulberry is one of the most striking and expensive. Intermediate woods are quince (karin in Japanese), kaya, cherry, keyaki and rosewood. Cheaper ones are made out of beech or chestnut. Bamboo also makes for a nice, low-cost bowl. The bowl can be polished. The best bowls are carved from a single piece of wood with the grain highlighted.

The bowls of highest quality and price are traditionally used only for the best shell and slate stones, of Yuki (snow-grade) quality. Lesser quality wood bowls likewise are used for Jitsuyo (standard-grade) and Tsuki (moon-grade) shell and slate stones, and glass stones are traditionally stored in the least expensive wood bowls or in plastic bowls.

== See also ==
- Go (game)
