= Yunzi =

Weiqi stones manufactured in Yunnan

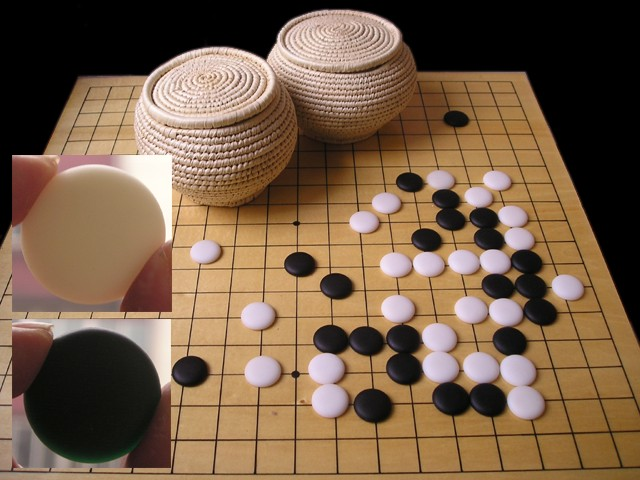
Yunzi

Yunzi (Traditional: 雲子; Simplified: 云子; Pinyin: Yúnzǐ; IPA [yn˧˥tsz̩˨˩˦]) refer to special weiqi (Go) pieces (called "stones") manufactured in the Chinese province of Yunnan. At various times in history they have also been termed yunbian (云扁) and yunyaozi (云窑子). Though technically Yunzi refers only to sintered stones made of "yunzi" material (the exact composition is a secret), the term can also sometimes connote stones which are single-convex of any material. Yunzi-style stones made of jade for instance, were often presented to the reigning emperor and his court in ancient China.

== Appearance ==
Yunzi are delicately made with a green luster yet are neither brittle nor slippery. The black and white pieces each have unique individual qualities. Old style white pieces are opaque with a tint of yellow or green. The black pieces are dark, and when held to the light have a translucent green hue. Newer yunzi, however, have pure white stones.

== History ==
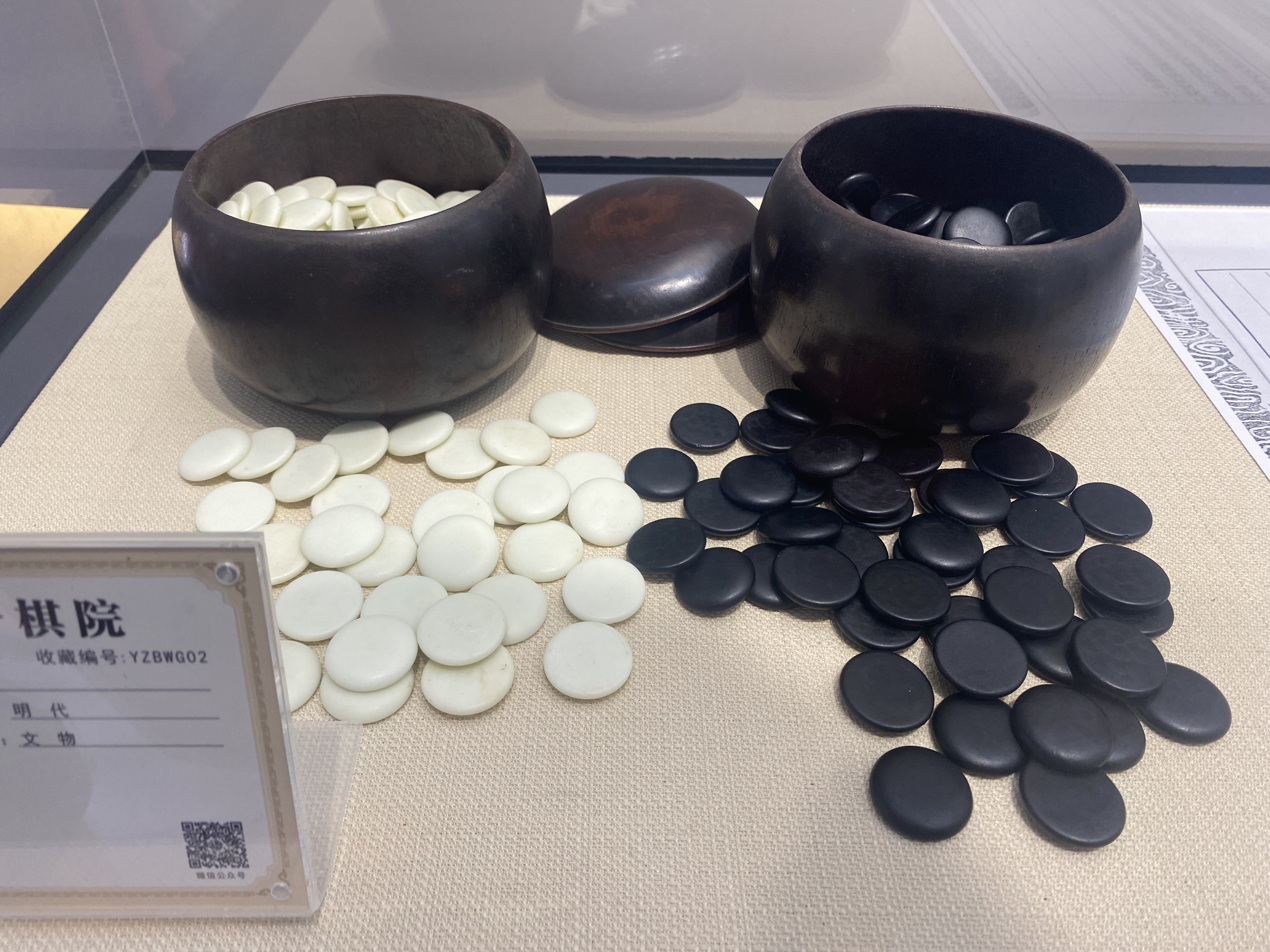
Antique Yunzi produced in Ming dynasty

The production of yunzi started in the Tang dynasty and reached its peak in the Ming and Qing dynasties; the total verifiable history of yunzi spans at least five hundred years.

Among yunzi, most famous was the yongzi (永子) manufactured by Yongchang Fu (永昌府, today the city of Baoshan, Yunnan) during the Ming dynasty. It was said that after a fire broke out in an imperial treasury, one of the keepers, who was from Yongchang Fu, discovered that melted pearls and jade had a special luster. When he returned to his hometown, he fashioned yunzi out of the agate and amber for which Yongchang Fu was famous. These yunzi went on to be prized by the literati and were offered to the Emperor.

Yunzi also appeared in Chinese literature as the subject of a number of verses penned over the years, being mentioned in works such as Ming Yi Tong Zhi (Ming Dynasty Comprehensive Geographic Survey) and Travels of Xu Xiake, both of which favored the yongzi.

Today in Baoshan there are still people who have antiques dating from the Ming dynasty; among those there remain one and a half original yongzi sets.

The yunzi have also been presented to international dignitaries including Queen Elizabeth II.

The traditional art of making yunzi was lost during the first few years of the 20th century because of war in the region. In 1964, General Chen Yi examined the situation of yunzi while inspecting Yunnan. Zhou Enlai also inquired about the possible reproduction of yunzi. The Yunnan Sports Commission investigated the Yunzi manufacturing processes and rediscovered the art by reverse engineering a few original Yunzi.

In 1974, the state-run Yunnan Weiqi Factory began manufacturing yunzi stones. They are used in professional weiqi tournaments in China and elsewhere. According to Chinese law, the yunzi stones can only be produced by the state run Yunzi company. The company creates the yunzi in an old factory that was used by the American Flying Tigers as barracks during World War II. The formula is thought to be ground Yunnan mountain stones and agate.

== Caring for yunzi ==
Like other types of Go stones, yunzi are washed and dried using a gentle soap solution to remove any dust from the packaging/manufacturing process. Although a light coat of oil, wiped clean, will help yunzi stones appear at their best, care must be taken in oiling yunzi. Because vegetable oils, such as olive or canola oil, will oxidise and become rancid over time, they should not be applied to yunzi to avoid developing an unpleasant odor. Instead, common practice is to use an unscented mineral oil to oil yunzi; alternatively, stones may be washed but remain unoiled; over time, the natural oils incurred by human touch will polish yunzi to a sheen.

Like glass Go stones, yunzi are durable. However, like glass stones, yunzi are still at risk for chipping if they are dropped or otherwise come into sharp contact with hard surfaces such as metal, tile, or stone.

== See also ==
- Go equipment
