= Oskar Korschelt =

German chemist and Go player (1853–1940)

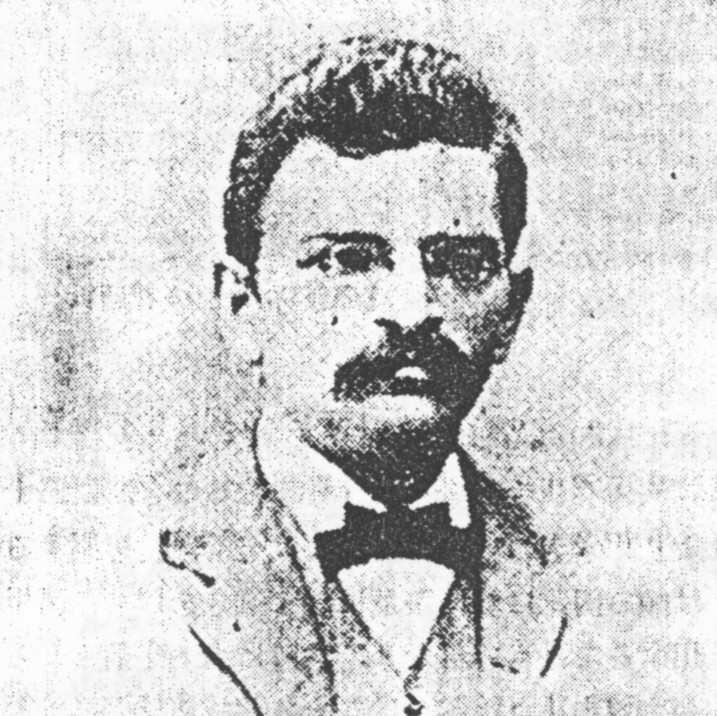
Oskar Korschelt

Oskar Korschelt (September 18, 1853 in Berthelsdorf – July 4, 1940 in Leipzig; some sources erroneously give him the name Oscar or Otto) was a German chemist and engineer who introduced the Asian strategy board game of Go to Europe, especially to Germany and Austria.

He was an industrial chemist working in the brewing industry. He arrived in Japan in 1875, teaching at Tokyo Medical School, which next year was merged into Tokyo University. In 1880 he gave up his academic position, then working on soil analysis for the Japanese government. He left Japan in 1884.

He learned about the game from Honinbo Shuho while in Japan. It is reported that they played on a six-stone handicap. After his return he lived in Leipzig.

He published a detailed article Das japanisch-chinesische Spiel Go, ein Konkurrent des Schach on Go in the journal Mitteilungen der Deutschen Gesellschaft für Natur und Völkerkunde Ostasiens in 1880/1. This report contained detailed commentaries on expert games. A few years later he published a book based on articles Das "Go"-Spiel from 1884, drawing on several Japanese sources.
