= Stoofvlees (chess) =

Chess engine

- Developer: Gian-Carlo Pascutto
- Release: 2007
- Stable release: Stoofvlees II
- Type: Chess engine
- License: Proprietary

Stoofvlees is a private experimental chess engine developed by Belgian programmer Gian-Carlo Pascutto, also known as the creator of Deep Sjeng and Leela Zero. First competing in 2007, the engine combines traditional game-tree search with a neural network evaluation function. Named after stoofvlees (Flemish beef stew), the program won back-to-back titles at the World Computer Chess Championship (WCCC) in 2023 and 2024 and has been a regular competitor in the Top Chess Engine Championship (TCEC) and the Chess.com Computer Chess Championship (CCC).

== History and design ==
Pascutto began developing Stoofvlees in the mid-2000s as an experimental testbed for machine-learning evaluation in computer chess. Unlike conventional engines of that era that relied solely on manually tuned evaluation weights, Stoofvlees paired a set of handcrafted positional feature recognizers with a neural network trained via supervised learning using an "oracle" derived from Grandmaster games. Insights from this early architecture were subsequently incorporated into Pascutto's commercial engine, Deep Sjeng.

In 2019, Pascutto introduced an updated, GPU-accelerated version dubbed Stoofvlees II. Built around a proprietary neural network evaluated on Nvidia graphics processing units (GPUs) alongside an alpha-beta search framework, the engine kept its network architecture and weights private while competing in major online engine leagues.

== Competitive results ==
Stoofvlees made its early tournament appearances in 2007, including the International CSVN Tournament (ICT 2007), where it was operated by Elke Van Vlierberghe alongside Deep Sjeng.

Following the release of Stoofvlees II in 2019, the engine entered top-tier computer chess competitions. In July 2019, it debuted in Season 16 of the Top Chess Engine Championship (TCEC), advancing from the qualification league to win Division 2, Division 1, and the Premier Division playoff before finishing fifth in the Premier Division. It subsequently remained a regular contender in TCEC's Premier Division as well as the Chess.com Computer Chess Championship (CCC), where it first reached the quarterfinals in CCC 9 in 2019.

In over-the-board hardware events organized by the International Computer Games Association (ICGA), Stoofvlees won the World Computer Chess Championship in July 2023—running on a 64-core AMD Threadripper Pro processor with four Nvidia RTX 4090 GPUs and an opening book by Erdogan Güneş. In October 2024, Pascutto successfully defended the title at the 50th-anniversary WCCC in Santiago de Compostela, Spain, tying for first place alongside Jonny and Raptor.
