= GNU Go =

Free software program that plays Go with the user

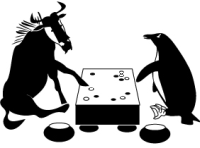

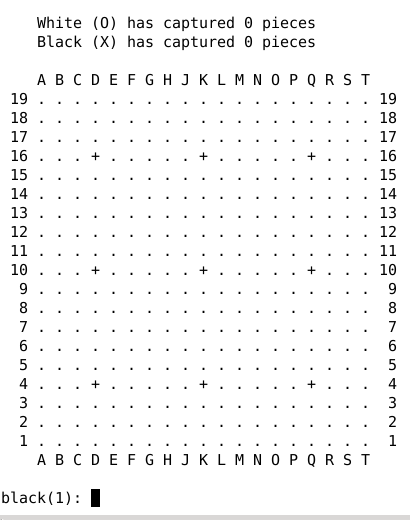
- Developer: GNU Go Team
- Initial release: 13 March 1989; 36 years ago
- Repository: git.savannah.gnu.org/cgit/gnugo.git
- Operating system: Linux, Windows, macOS
- Type: Computer Go
- License: GNU GPLv3
- Website: www.gnu.org/software/gnugo

GNU Go is a free software program by the Free Software Foundation that plays Go. Its source code is quite portable, and can be easily compiled for Linux, as well as other Unix-like systems, Microsoft Windows and macOS; ports exist for other platforms.

The program plays Go against the user, at about 5 to 7 kyu strength on the 9×9 board. Multiple board sizes are supported, from 5×5 to 19×19.

== Strength ==
At this level of performance, GnuGo was between six and seven stones weaker than the top commercial programs on good hardware as of early 2009, but comparable in strength to the strongest programs not using Monte Carlo methods. It did well at many computer Go tournaments. For instance, it took the gold medal at the 2003 and 2006 Computer Olympiad and second place at the 2006 Gifu Challenge.

== Protocols ==
Although ASCII-based, GNU Go supports two protocols—the Go Modem Protocol and the Go Text Protocol—by which GUIs can interface with it to give a graphical display. Several such GUIs exist. GTP also allows it to play online on Go servers (through the use of bridge programs), and copies can be found running on NNGS, KGS, and probably others.

== Versions ==
The current (stable) version of GNU Go is 3.8. The latest experimental release was 3.9.1. There is also an experimental feature for using Monte Carlo methods for 9×9 board play.

A version called Pocket GNU Go, based on GNU Go 2.6, is available for the Windows CE operating system (Pocket PC). Versions based on the much weaker 1.2 engine also exist for the Game Boy Advance and Palm Pilot.

== See also ==
- Computer Go
- Go
- Go software
- GNU Chess
- List of open source games
