= European Go Cup =

- Full name: Pandanet Go European Cup
- Started: 2007
- Sponsors: Pandanet
- Prize money: Varies
- Affiliation: European Go Federation

The Pandanet Go European Cup was a Go competition played across Europe. The now defunct European Cup and European Go Tour (which both ended in April 2007) merged to form this cup after Toyota's support of the Tour ended. Many of the games played during the Cup are broadcast on Pandanet's Internet Go Server (IGS) and the KGS Go Server. Since 2011, Pandanet decided to end the support of this competition and wanted to take care of the European Go Teams Championship. This competition is called now European Go Cup as previously.

== Format ==
The Pandanet Go European Cup consists of a series of events spread out across Europe. These events fall into one of five levels (two carried over from the European Cup and three from the Tour). Each event awards points to the top players based on both the event's level and the place earned by the player. In the bottom two levels these points are purchased by the tournament holder and at the upper three levels, Pandanet purchases points. Each point is equivalent to €6 (≈$8.25 US$). Players can carry a maximum of 100 points into the finals.

Though there are twelve upper-level (levels 3, 4, and 5) events held every year, the number of lower-level (levels 1 or 2) events can vary with the sole restriction that there may not be more than two events at any level, per country, per year. Because of this, the prize money has the ability to change from year to year. With the guaranteed twelve Pandanet events, the overall prize money is at least €4,500, with more events resulting in more money offered. This purse is split amongst the top twelve overall players based on position.

=== Level 1 – Tournament ===
These events are entirely funded by the holder and any sponsor they can secure on their own. Prizes beyond awarding points must also be provided by the tournament holder. Tournaments are not required to broadcast games via Pandanet but may do so if they wish. These events are also the only ones that may be held at the same time as a higher-level event. Tournaments award their 25 points (€150, ≈$206.49 USD) to the top six based on place.

=== Level 2 – Super Tournament ===
As with level 1 tournaments, a Super Tournament gets no funding from Pandanet. The biggest difference between levels 1 and 2 are the points awarded—a Super Tournament gives out 50 points (€300, ≈$412.98 USD). Furthermore, Super Tournaments offer points for the top eight as opposed to only six in a level 1 tournament.

=== Level 3 – Pandanet Super Tournament ===
Pandanet Super Tournaments are a lot like regular Super Tournaments, both give out the same number of points to the top eight players. At level 3, however, funding is provided by Pandanet. Pandanet also provides prize money for the top three in each level 3 event. Seven Pandanet Super Tournaments are played each year.

=== Level 4 – Pandanet Major Tournament ===
Pandanet Major Tournaments are held only four times out of the year. Like the Pandanet Supers, Major Tournaments are funded by Pandanet and have additional monetary prizes provided by them as well. Furthermore, an additional budget is provided to pay for European go professionals (or 7-dan amateurs) to teach at the event. Major tournaments award 75 points (€450, ≈$606.87 USD), split up between the top ten players.

=== Level 5 – Pandanet Finals ===
The last event of the Cup, the Pandanet Finals are held in Paris, France. At least two games from each round are broadcast on Pandanet. This event awards 100 points (€600, ≈$809.16 USD) to the top twelve finishers.

== Prizes and points awarded ==
Place	Tournament	Super	Pandanet Super	Pandanet Major	Finals
1st	9 pts	12 pts	12 pts, €150	15 pts, €200	21 pts, €300
2nd	6 pts	10 pts	10 pts, €100	13 pts, €150	17 pts, €200
3rd	4 pts	8 pts	8 pts, €50	11 pts, €100	14 pts, €100
4th	3 pts	6 pts	6 pts	9 pts	11 pts
5th	2 pts	5 pts	5 pts	7 pts	9 pts
6th	1 pts	4 pts	4 pts	6 pts	7 pts
7th		3 pts	3 pts	5 pts	6 pts
8th		2 pts	2 pts	4 pts	5 pts
9th				3 pts	4 pts
10th				2 pts	3 pts
11th					2 pts
12th					1 pts

== 1st Pandanet Go European Cup Locations ==
Dates	Location
11–13 May 2007	Visegrád, Hungary
17–20 May 2007	Amsterdam, The Netherlands
26–28 May 2007	Hamburg, Germany
2–3 June 2007	Cormons, Italy
29 June – 1 July 2007	Warsaw, Poland
3–5 August 2007	Leksand, Sweden
31 August – 2 September 2007	Brno, Czech Republic
22–23 September 2007	Istanbul, Turkey
29–30 September 2007	Leipzig, Germany
5–7 October 2007	Bratislava, Slovakia
12–14 October 2007	Kyiv, Ukraine
20–21 October 2007	Moscow, Russia
7–9 December 2007	Banja Luka, Bosnia
28–31 December 2007	London, England
17–21 January 2008	Baku, Azerbaijan
February 2008	Takapotku, Finland†
23–24 February 2008	Barcelona, Spain
22–24 March 2008	Paris, France

†The status of this event is provisional

== See also ==
- European Go players
- European Go Championship
- European Youth Go Championship
- European Pair Go Championship
