= Leela (software) =

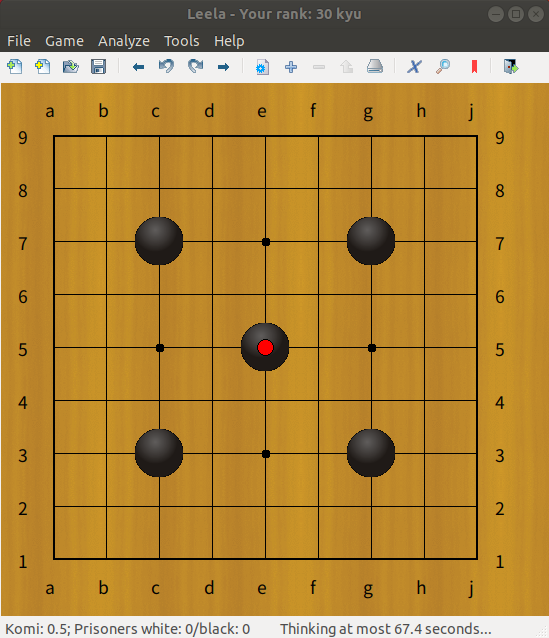
- Leela 0.11.0 on Ubuntu18.04
- Original author: Gian-Carlo Pascutto
- Developer: Gian-Carlo Pascutto
- Stable release: 0.11.0 / 24 October 2017; 8 years ago
- Operating system: Windows, macOS, Linux
- Type: Go software
- License: MIT License
- Website: www.sjeng.org/leela.html

Leela is a computer Go software developed by Belgian programmer Gian-Carlo Pascutto, the author of chess engine Sjeng. It won the third place for 19x19 board Go and the second place for 9x9 board Go at the Computer Olympiad in 2008, and won the eighth place in the 1st World AI Go Tournament in August 2017. According to its website, it has "Strength over 9 dan on 19 x 19, depending on hardware". The program was named "Leela" because the author wanted a pleasant female name that contrasted with the prevailing style at the time, typified by names like "Shredder", "Tiger", and "Rebel".

A version featuring deep learning technology was released for free in February 2017. It was the first Go engine close to professional level freely available on a personal computer.

Leela should not be confused with Leela Zero, a stronger program developed by Pascutto and collaborators beginning in late 2017.

== See also ==
- Leela Zero, an open-source Go-playing program based on DeepMind's AlphaGo Zero paper, also developed by Gian-Carlo Pascutto
- Leela Chess Zero, an open-source chess-playing program that was adapted from Leela Zero
