= Progress in artificial intelligence =

Progress in artificial intelligence (AI) is the advances, milestones, and breakthroughs that have been achieved in the field of artificial intelligence over time. AI is a branch of computer science that aims to create machines and systems capable of performing tasks that typically require human intelligence. AI applications have been used in a wide range of fields including medical diagnosis, finance, robotics, law, video games, agriculture, and scientific discovery. The society as a whole is looking for artificial intelligence to be on a key factor in the upcoming years because of its potential. However, many AI applications are not perceived as AI: "A lot of cutting-edge AI has filtered into general applications, often without being called AI because once something becomes useful enough and common enough it's not labeled AI anymore."

"Many thousands of AI applications are deeply embedded in the infrastructure of every industry." In the late 1990s and early 2000s, AI technology became widely used as elements of larger systems, but the field was rarely credited for these successes at the time.

Kaplan and Haenlein structure artificial intelligence along three evolutionary stages:

1. Artificial narrow intelligence – AI capable only of specific tasks;
2. Artificial general intelligence – AI with ability in several areas, and able to autonomously solve problems they were never even designed for;
3. Artificial superintelligence – AI capable of general tasks, including scientific creativity, social skills, and general wisdom.

To allow comparison with human performance, artificial intelligence can be evaluated on constrained and well-defined problems. Such tests have been termed subject-matter expert Turing tests. Also, smaller problems provide more achievable goals and there are an ever-increasing number of positive results.

In 2023, humans still substantially outperformed both GPT-4 and other models tested on the ConceptARC benchmark. Those models scored 60% on most, and 77% on one category, while humans scored 91% on all and 97% on one category. However, later research in 2025 showed that human-generated output grids were only accurate 73% of the time, while AI models available that year managed to score above 77%.

== History ==
Increasing, promoting or constraining AI progress has often been done via controlling or increasing the amount of compute.

== Current performance in specific areas ==
Game	Champion year	Legal states (log_{10})	Game tree complexity (log_{10})	Game of perfect information?	Ref.
Draughts (checkers)	1994	21	31	Perfect	
Othello (reversi)	1997	28	58	Perfect	
Chess	1997	46	123	Perfect	
Scrabble	2006				
Shogi	2017	71	226	Perfect	
Go	2017	172	360	Perfect	
2p no-limit hold 'em	2017			Imperfect	
StarCraft	-	270+		Imperfect	
StarCraft II	2019			Imperfect	

There are many useful abilities that can be described as showing some form of intelligence. This gives better insight into the comparative success of artificial intelligence in different areas.

AI, like electricity or the steam engine, is a general-purpose technology. There is no consensus on how to characterize which tasks AI tends to excel at. Some versions of Moravec's paradox observe that humans are more likely to outperform machines in areas such as physical dexterity that have been the direct target of natural selection. While projects such as AlphaZero have succeeded in generating their own knowledge from scratch, many other machine learning projects require large training datasets. Researcher Andrew Ng has suggested, as a "highly imperfect rule of thumb", that "almost anything a typical human can do with less than one second of mental thought, we can probably now or in the near future automate using AI."

Games provide a high-profile benchmark for assessing rates of progress; many games have a large professional player base and a well-established competitive rating system. AlphaGo brought the era of classical board-game benchmarks to a close when Artificial Intelligence proved their competitive edge over humans in 2016. Deep Mind's AlphaGo AI software program defeated the world's best professional Go Player Lee Sedol. Games of imperfect knowledge provide new challenges to AI in the area of game theory; the most prominent milestone in this area was brought to a close by Libratus' poker victory in 2017. E-sports continue to provide additional benchmarks; Facebook AI, Deepmind, and others have engaged with the popular StarCraft franchise of videogames.

Broad classes of outcome for an AI test may be given as:

- optimal: it is not possible to perform better (note: some of these entries were solved by humans)
- super-human: performs better than all humans
- high-human: performs better than most humans
- par-human: performs similarly to most humans
- sub-human: performs worse than most humans

=== Optimal ===
- Tic-tac-toe
- Connect Four: 1988
- Checkers (aka 8x8 draughts): Weakly solved (2007)
- Rubik's Cube: Mostly solved (2010)
- Heads-up limit hold'em poker: Statistically optimal in the sense that "a human lifetime of play is not sufficient to establish with statistical significance that the strategy is not an exact solution" (2015)

=== Super-human ===
- Othello (aka reversi): c. 1997
- Scrabble: 2006
- Backgammon: c. 1995–2002
- Chess: Supercomputer (c. 1997); Personal computer (c. 2006); Mobile phone (c. 2009); Computer defeats human + computer (c. 2017)
- Jeopardy!: Question answering, although the machine did not use speech recognition (2011)
- Arimaa: 2015
- Shogi: c. 2017
- Go: 2017
- Heads-up no-limit hold'em poker: 2017
- Six-player no-limit hold'em poker: 2019
- Gran Turismo Sport: 2022

=== High-human ===
- Crosswords: c. 2012
- Freeciv: 2016
- Dota 2: 2018
- Bridge card-playing: According to a 2009 review, "the best programs are attaining expert status as (bridge) card players", excluding bidding.
- StarCraft II: 2019
- Mahjong: 2019
- Stratego: 2022
- No-Press Diplomacy: 2022
- Hanabi: 2022
- Natural language processing

=== Par-human ===
- Optical character recognition for ISO 1073-1:1976 and similar special characters.
- Classification of images
- Handwriting recognition
- Facial recognition
- Visual question answering
- SQuAD 2.0 English reading-comprehension benchmark (2019)
- SuperGLUE English-language understanding benchmark (2020)
- Some school science exams (2019)
- Some tasks based on Raven's Progressive Matrices
- Many Atari 2600 games (2015)

=== Sub-human ===
- Optical character recognition for printed text (nearing par-human for Latin-script typewritten text)
- Object recognition
- Various robotics tasks that may require advances in robot hardware as well as AI, including:
  - Stable bipedal locomotion: Bipedal robots can walk, but are less stable than human walkers (as of 2017)
  - Humanoid soccer
- Speech recognition: "nearly equal to human performance" (2017)
- Explainability. Current medical systems can diagnose certain medical conditions well, but cannot explain to users why they made the diagnosis.
- Many tests of fluid intelligence (2020)
- Bongard visual cognition problems, such as the Bongard-LOGO benchmark (2020)
- Visual Commonsense Reasoning (VCR) benchmark (as of 2020)
- Stock market prediction: Financial data collection and processing using Machine Learning algorithms
- Angry Birds video game, as of 2020
- Various tasks that are difficult to solve without contextual knowledge, including:
  - Translation
  - Word-sense disambiguation

== Proposed tests of artificial intelligence ==
In his famous Turing test, Alan Turing picked language, the defining feature of human beings, for its basis. The Turing test is now considered too exploitable to be a meaningful benchmark.

The Feigenbaum test, proposed by the inventor of expert systems, tests a machine's knowledge and expertise about a specific subject. A paper by Jim Gray of Microsoft in 2003 suggested extending the Turing test to speech understanding, speaking and recognizing objects and behavior.

Proposed "universal intelligence" tests aim to compare how well machines, humans, and even non-human animals perform on problem sets that are generic as possible. At an extreme, the test suite can contain every possible problem, weighted by Kolmogorov complexity; however, these problem sets tend to be dominated by impoverished pattern-matching exercises where a tuned AI can easily exceed human performance levels.

== Exams ==
According to OpenAI, in 2023 GPT-4 achieved high scores on several standardized and professional examinations, including around the 90th percentile on the Uniform Bar Exam, the 89th percentile on the mathematics section of the SAT, the 93rd percentile on SAT Reading and Writing, the 54th percentile on the analytical writing section of the GRE, the 88th percentile on GRE quantitative reasoning, and the 99th percentile on GRE verbal reasoning. OpenAI also reported that GPT-4 scored in the 99th to 100th percentile on the 2020 USA Biology Olympiad semifinal exam and earned top scores on several AP exams.

Independent researchers found in 2023 that ChatGPT based on GPT-3.5 performed "at or near the passing threshold" on all three parts of the United States Medical Licensing Examination (USMLE), suggesting that large language models could reach passing-level performance on some medical knowledge assessments even without domain-specific fine-tuning. GPT-3.5 was also reported to attain a low but passing grade on examinations for four law school courses at the University of Minnesota.

Further studies reported that GPT-4 passed a text-based radiology board-style examination. Later radiology studies in 2024–2025 continued to find strong performance by newer models on exam-style questions, including image-based and student radiology examinations, while also noting persistent weaknesses and variation by task type.

By 2025, comparative studies found substantial variation in medical-exam performance across models rather than a uniform "passing" level. A 2025 benchmarking study on publicly available USMLE sample questions reported that newer models such as ChatGPT and DeepSeek outperformed some rivals, but also made distinct errors and still showed limitations in clinical reasoning and domain-specific understanding.

Newer legal benchmarks published in 2025 likewise suggested that exam performance remained uneven. The LEXam benchmark, built from 340 law exams across 116 law school courses, found that long-form legal reasoning remained challenging for contemporary large language models, especially on open-ended questions requiring structured, multi-step analysis.

By 2026, broader work on expert-level academic testing emphasized that many older benchmarks and exam-style tasks were becoming saturated. A 2026 Nature paper introducing Humanity's Last Exam argued that state-of-the-art systems had surpassed 90% accuracy on several popular benchmarks, while still showing low accuracy on a more difficult benchmark designed to test the frontier of expert human knowledge. Stanford HAI also cautioned in 2025 that benchmark and exam performance should not be treated as equivalent to reliable real-world performance or trustworthy decision-making.

== Competitions ==
Many competitions and prizes, such as the Imagenet Challenge, promote research in artificial intelligence. The most common areas of competition include general machine intelligence, conversational behavior, data-mining, robotic cars, and robot soccer as well as conventional games.

== Past and current predictions ==
An expert poll around 2016, conducted by Katja Grace of the Future of Humanity Institute and associates, gave median estimates of 3 years for championship Angry Birds, 4 years for the World Series of Poker, and 6 years for StarCraft. On more subjective tasks, the poll gave 6 years for folding laundry as well as an average human worker, 7–10 years for expertly answering 'easily Googleable' questions, 8 years for average speech transcription, 9 years for average telephone banking, and 11 years for expert songwriting, but over 30 years for writing a New York Times bestseller or winning the Putnam math competition.

Subsequent developments in the late 2010s and early 2020s showed rapid progress in several benchmark tasks, particularly in games and structured problem domains. Systems such as AlphaGo, AlphaZero, and later large language models achieved or exceeded human-level performance on a range of established benchmarks.

At the same time, researchers have noted that performance on narrow benchmarks can saturate as systems are optimized for specific tasks, and that success on such evaluations does not necessarily generalize to broader forms of intelligence.

=== Chess ===
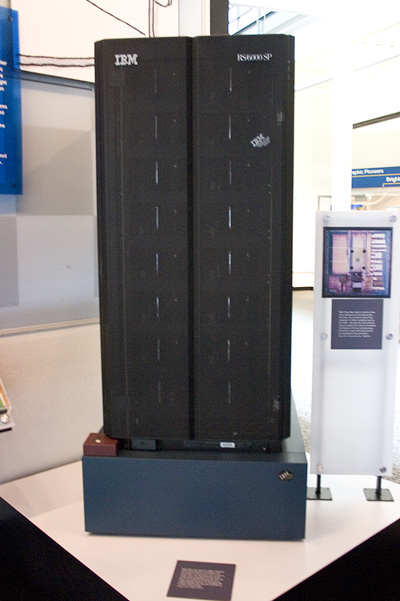
Deep Blue at the Computer History Museum

An AI defeated a grandmaster in a regulation tournament game for the first time in 1988; rebranded as Deep Blue, it beat the reigning human world chess champion in 1997 (see Deep Blue versus Garry Kasparov).

By the 2010s, chess engines running on consumer hardware had surpassed top human players by a wide margin. Neural-network-based systems such as AlphaZero demonstrated that superhuman performance could be achieved through reinforcement learning from self-play without reliance on human expert data. Modern engines are widely used in preparation and analysis, and unaided human play is no longer competitive with top computer systems.

Estimates when computers would exceed humans at Chess
Year prediction made	Predicted year	Number of years	Predictor	Contemporaneous source
1957	1967 or sooner	10 or less	Herbert A. Simon, economist	
1990	2000 or sooner	10 or less	Ray Kurzweil, futurist	Age of Intelligent Machines

=== Go ===
AlphaGo defeated a European Go champion in October 2015, and Lee Sedol in March 2016, one of the world's top players (see AlphaGo versus Lee Sedol). According to Scientific American and other sources, most observers had expected superhuman Computer Go performance to be at least a decade away.

Subsequent systems such as AlphaGo Zero and AlphaZero demonstrated that superhuman performance could be achieved without human training data, using reinforcement learning from self-play. By the late 2010s, computer Go programs had surpassed human champions by a substantial margin, and Go ceased to be a primary frontier benchmark for AI research.

Estimates when computers would exceed humans at Go
Year prediction made	Predicted year	Number of years	Predictor	Affiliation	Contemporaneous source
1997	2100 or later	103 or more	Piet Hutt, physicist and Go fan	Institute for Advanced Study	New York Times
2007	2017 or sooner	10 or less	Feng-Hsiung Hsu, Deep Blue lead	Microsoft Research Asia	IEEE Spectrum
2014	2024	10	Rémi Coulom, Computer Go programmer	CrazyStone	Wired

=== Human-level artificial general intelligence (AGI) ===
AI pioneer and economist Herbert A. Simon inaccurately predicted in 1965: "Machines will be capable, within twenty years, of doing any work a man can do". Similarly, in 1970 Marvin Minsky wrote that "Within a generation... the problem of creating artificial intelligence will substantially be solved."

Four polls conducted in 2012 and 2013 suggested that the median estimate among experts for when AGI would arrive was 2040 to 2050, depending on the poll.

The Grace poll around 2016 found results varied depending on how the question was framed. Respondents asked to estimate "when unaided machines can accomplish every task better and more cheaply than human workers" gave an aggregated median answer of 45 years and a 10% chance of it occurring within 9 years. Other respondents asked to estimate "when all occupations are fully automatable. That is, when for any occupation, machines could be built to carry out the task better and more cheaply than human workers" estimated a median of 122 years and a 10% probability of 20 years. The median response for when "AI researcher" could be fully automated was around 90 years. No link was found between seniority and optimism, but Asian researchers were much more optimistic than North American researchers on average; Asians predicted 30 years on average for "accomplish every task", compared with the 74 years predicted by North Americans.

A larger survey of 2,778 researchers who had published in top AI venues, fielded in 2023 and published in 2025, found shorter timelines for what it called "high-level machine intelligence". In that survey, the aggregate forecast assigned a 10% chance to unaided machines outperforming humans at every task by 2027 and a 50% chance by 2047. The same survey estimated that the full automation of all human occupations would reach a 10% probability by 2037 and a 50% probability by 2116.

Despite increasingly short timelines in some surveys, there was still no consensus in late 2025 and early 2026 that AGI was imminent. In Stanford HAI's predictions for 2026, co-director James Landay said: "there will be no AGI this year".

The concept of AGI has been criticized as ill defined, vague, driven by corporate hype (partically during the ongoing AI boom).

Estimates of when AGI will arrive
Year prediction made	Predicted year	Number of years	Predictor	Contemporaneous source
1965	1985 or sooner	20 or less	Herbert A. Simon	The shape of automation for men and management
1993	2023 or sooner	30 or less	Vernor Vinge, science fiction writer	"The Coming Technological Singularity"
1995	2040 or sooner	45 or less	Hans Moravec, robotics researcher	Wired
2008	Never / Distant future (Note: IEEE Spectrum attributes to Moore both "Never" and "I don't believe this kind of thing is likely to happen, at least for a long time")		Gordon E. Moore, inventor of Moore's Law	IEEE Spectrum
2017	2029	12	Ray Kurzweil	Interview

== See also ==
- Applications of artificial intelligence
- List of artificial intelligence projects
- List of emerging technologies
