= Leela Zero =

Computer Go software

- Original author: Gian-Carlo Pascutto
- Developer: Gian-Carlo Pascutto
- Release: 25 October 2017; 8 years ago
- Final release: 0.17 / 4 April 2019; 7 years ago
- Written in: C++
- Type: Go software
- License: GPL-3.0
- Website: zero.sjeng.org
- Repository: github.com/gcp/leela-zero

Leela Zero is a free and open-source computer Go program released on 25 October 2017. It is developed by Belgian programmer Gian-Carlo Pascutto, the author of chess engine Sjeng and Go engine Leela.

Leela Zero's algorithm is based on DeepMind's 2017 paper about AlphaGo Zero. Unlike the original Leela, which has a lot of human knowledge and heuristics programmed into it, the program code in Leela Zero only knows the basic rules and nothing more. The knowledge that makes Leela Zero a strong player is contained in a neural network, which is trained based on the results of previous games that the program played.

Leela Zero is trained by a distributed effort, which is coordinated at the Leela Zero website. Members of the community provide computing resources by running the client, which generates self-play games and submits them to the server. The self-play games are used to train newer networks. Generally, over 500 clients have connected to the server to contribute resources. The community has provided high quality code contributions as well.

== Version history ==
Leela Zero finished third at the BerryGenomics Cup World AI Go Tournament in Fuzhou, Fujian, China on 28 April 2018. The New Yorker at the end of 2018 characterized Leela and Leela Zero as "the world’s most successful open-source Go engines".

In early 2018, another team branched Leela Chess Zero from the same code base, also to verify the methods in the AlphaZero paper as applied to the game of chess. AlphaZero's use of Google TPUs was replaced by a crowd-sourcing infrastructure and the ability to use graphics card GPUs via the OpenCL library. Even so, it is expected to take a year of crowd-sourced training to make up for the dozen hours that AlphaZero was allowed to train for its chess match in the paper.

The distributed training server was shut down on 15 February 2021, marking the end of Leela Zero project. The page now directs visitors to KataGo and SAI.

The model sizes increased steadily over time. The first released model has hash name d645af97, size 1x8 (1 layer, 8 channels), and released at 10 November 2017. The last released model has hash name 0e9ea880, size 40x256, and was released at 15 February 2021.

== Technology ==
Leela Zero is an (almost) exact replication of AlphaGo Zero in both training process and architecture.

The training process is Monte-Carlo Tree Search with self-play, exactly the same as AlphaGo Zero.

The architecture is the same as AlphaGo Zero (with one difference). Consider the last released model, 0e9ea880. It has 47 million parameters, and the following architecture:

- The stem of the network takes as input a 18x19x19 tensor representation of the Go board.
  - 8 channels are the positions of the current player's stones from the last eight time steps. (1 if there is a stone, 0 otherwise. If the time step go before the beginning of the game, then 0 in all positions.)
  - 8 channels are the positions of the other player's stones from the last eight time steps.
  - 1 channel is all 1 if black is to move, and 0 otherwise.
  - 1 channel is all 1 if white is to move, and 0 otherwise. (This channel is not present in the original AlphaGo Zero)
- The body is a ResNet with 40 residual blocks and 256 channels.
- There are two heads, a policy head and a value head.
  - Policy head outputs a logit array of size $19 \times 19 + 1$, representing the logit of making a move in one of the points, plus the logit of passing.
  - Value head outputs a number in the range $(-1, +1)$, representing the expected score for the current player. -1 represents current player losing, and +1 winning.
