= UEC =

UEC may refer to:

== Organisations ==
- Uganda Electoral Commission, the electoral commission of Uganda
- Union Election Commission, the electoral commission of Myanmar
- University of Electro-Communications, a university based in Chofu city, Tokyo, Japanese
- University of Exeter, Cornwall Campus, campus of the University of Exeter at Tremough, in Penryn, Cornwall, UK
- Union Européenne de Cyclisme (European Cycling Union)
- United Electric Car Company, a defunct tramcar manufacturer in the UK
- United Engine Corporation, a Russian aircraft engine manufacturer
- The Urban Ecology Center, an urban ecology nonprofit located in Milwaukee

== Science and technology ==
- Universal electronic card, an identity card formerly issued to citizens of Russia
- Ubuntu Enterprise Cloud, open-source infrastructure for cloud computing under Ubuntu Linux
- Urea, electrolytes, creatinine, a blood test sometimes referred to as a basic metabolic panel

== Other uses ==
- Urban entertainment center, an amusement park
- Unified Examinations Certificate, an examination held by the United School Committees' Association Malaysia for Chinese independent high school students
- UEC Cup, computer Go tournament held at the University of Electro-Communications
