= Crazy Stone =

Crazy Stone may refer to:

- Crazy Stone (film), 2006 Chinese film
- Crazy Stone (software), Go playing engine
