= MIGOS =

MIGOS can refer to:

- Migos, an American hip hop group founded in 2008, composed of rappers Quavo, Offset and Takeoff.
- Mini GO Solver (MIGOS), a computer program which found a solution to a 5x5 game of Go in 2002.
