= Zobrist =

Zobrist is a surname. Notable people with the surname include:

- Albert Lindsey Zobrist (born 1942), American computer scientist, games researcher, and inventor
- Ben Zobrist (born 1981), American baseball player
- Julianna Zobrist (born 1984), American musician

== See also ==
- Zobrist hashing, computer game theory construction named after Albert Lindsey Zobrist
