= Go Text Protocol =

Protocol for Go engines and Go servers

The Go Text Protocol (GTP) is a protocol used by several Go engines and Go servers for playing the board game Go on the computer. GTP version 1 has been implemented in GNU Go 3.0.0 but the protocol lacks a proper specification. The currently used version is GTP 2 which exists as a draft specification and has not been finalized.

== See also ==
- Computer Go
- Go software
- Internet Go servers
