= Small arms master gunner =

Small arms master gunner (SAMG) is an appointment of a subject matter expert (SME) within the US Army in the field of small arms, optics, and lasers for combat units.

== Roles for SAMGs ==
SAMGs are critical to units that require knowledge of weapons utilizing advanced optics and laser systems. These units employ the SAMGs to increase the proficiency and effectiveness of their personnel with multiple types of weapons systems. Qualified SAMGs at the division, brigade, and battalion levels, can supply the correct off-sets for bore-lighting the lasers, and can teach proper zeroing techniques among a multitude of other benefits.

In the United States infantry, small arms master gunners are experts in all aspects of the unit's weapon systems. These weapon systems range from the standard infantry rifle with optics and lasers, assigned machine guns and grenade launchers with optics and lasers, as well as any specialized sniper weapons that may be fielded.

Small arms master gunners fill advisory rather than command posts. They are trained to assist in the planning, development, execution, and evaluation of all weapon systems, including crew-served weapon-related training (individual, crew, and collective), and unit planning for ranges, and are able to resource needed materials for each piece of equipment.

== History ==
In 2000 at Fort Benning, Georgia, the infantry schoolhouse saw the need to create a SAMG course that would get NCOs "smart" on the optics and lasers being fielded during this time. A curriculum was created by the 2-29th, and NCOs from the 18th Airborne Corps (82nd ABN DIV, 101st ABN (ASSLT), and the 10th MTN DIV) attended. The schoolhouse lasted only a year and a half, but not due to lack of progress. As soon as a mechanized infantry sergeant major took over, the school, along with its resources, was abolished.

Fort Bragg seized the initiative and began its own course in 2001. This school taught small arms, as well as the Squad Designated Marksman, essentially filling a gap of coverage that was realized in Afghanistan from 300 meters out to 1500 meters by converting a Rifleman into that role. During this time, the army was being fielded optics and lasers in rapid succession, due to the events of 9/11. The course ran until deployments to Afghanistan and Iraq depleted the units on post because every brigade was deployed; however, by this time every battalion, brigade, and division had their own dedicated small arms master gunners. This was maintained by the command until late 2010.

In 2010, the Fort Bliss command sergeant major-David Davenport realized that the knowledge of weapons, optics, lasers, and now thermals, was virtually nonexistent. He noticed different companies within battalions were zeroing and bore-lighting all their equipment differently. Soldiers did not know how to use their lasers or thermals, and there was no consistency in the installation. He appointed a 1st Armored Division small arms master gunner (a graduate of the Fort Bragg SAMG course) to create a curriculum that would put all his NCOs on the same page with the various equipment issued throughout his division. The Fort Bliss SAMG built a course that encompassed every weapon, laser, and optic used on Fort Bliss. There had to be many changes made to the course that the SAMG was building compared to the one he attended in 2001. This course also included an introduction to the many available training tools and resources that most Fort Bliss NCOs were unaware of, as well as re-introducing the Squad Designated Marksman to the light units that were on Fort Bliss at the time. The SAMG partnered with the industry and incorporated NAMMO Talley Defense for SMAW-D and LAW knowledge, as well as Insight Technology (L-3) for expertise on the correct way to utilize the lasers and optics. Great strides were reached on Fort Bliss, and by 2012 the Fort Bliss Division SAMG was teaching a course once a quarter, running competitions on the installation, and was a "one-stop-shop" for anything small arms related. During this time, the Fort Bliss SAMG program had trained over 200 non-commissioned officers (as well as one captain). It had also shared its curriculum with the 25th ID, and the unit which originally spawned the SAMG course, 2-29 at Fort Benning GA. The curriculum was submitted to The Fort Bliss PCSM, who had originally been appointed the Fort Bliss SAMG, and left Fort Bliss in the summer of 2012. Fort Bliss' Command team (at that time a mechanized group) did not share the same enthusiasm for the lethality of the soldier on the ground because the 2 light Brigades were turned into heavy Brigades and the Fort Bliss Small Arms Master Gunner Course disintegrated in February 2013, as the original Fort Bliss SAMG retired.

In 2019 the US Army recognized that having a subject matter expert to focus on "the weapon system" was a combat multiplier for deployed units. They saw how these subject matter experts had enhanced combat unit marksmanship, and were eager to make similar changes to the Army. The Army adopted a lot of what the Small Arms Master Gunner at Fort Bliss had put in place in 2010. In TC 3-20.40, Training and Qualification, Individual Weapons, the role of the Small Arms Master Gunner is now recognized as the "Marksmanship Master Trainer".

== Duties ==
The small arms master gunner's specific duties: SME on all weapons, optics, lasers, thermal devices, and/or laser range finders in the unit in which the SAMG operates. Oversees the qualification and sustainment training of all weapon systems. Assists the commander in a 6-month training plan for ranges, ammo, and certification as per DIV GUNSOP and below. SME on available training resources. Supervises live-fire ranges to ensure SOPs are followed. Advises the commander on the tactical capabilities of all weapons and weapon systems.

== Typical SAMG unit structure ==
- Division SAMG-enforces division standards, disseminate information to BDE SAMGs, assists BDE SAMGs in providing training and resources, and provides a link to industry, and off-post SAMGs.
- Brigade SAMG works closely with the master gunners at lower echelons to ensure standards are uniform throughout the brigade, and assists BN SAMGs in providing training, and resources.
- Battalion SAMG enforces battalion standards, coordinates with the companies for training assets, checks on company training (PMI)
- Company SAMG ensures battalion standards are followed, teaches preliminary marksmanship instruction, and assists in troubleshooting and maintenance of weapons.
