= French Federation of Go =

Fédération Française de Go
- Formation: 1978
- Type: Association
- Headquarters: Paris, France
- Members: official French go clubs
- Official language: French
- President: Frédéric Renaud
- Website: ffg.jeudego.org

The French Federation of Go, or Fédération Française de Go (FFG), is a French association (as per the 1901 law about association) that governs the game of Go in France. Founded in 1978, it obtained the "popular education and youth agreement" from the "Ministry of Health, Youth, Sport and Associative Life" in February 1991.

The FFG has been a member of the "Mind Games and Leisure Activities Confederation" (CLE) (a French confederation) since 1983, and is also affiliated to the European Go Federation.

== Organisation ==
In October 2008, the FFG was composed of 110 clubs, with more than 1,650 licensed players.

The FFG is divided into 9 regional leagues:

- Ligue Rhône-Alpes (main towns: Lyon & Grenoble)
- Ligue Île-de-France (Paris, its suburbs and Orléans, Auxerre & Chartres area)
- Ligue de l'Ouest (Brittany and nearby areas)
- Ligue de Normandie (Normandy area)
- Ligue du Sud-Ouest (Aquitaine and some of south-west France)
- Ligue du Centre (main towns: Clermont-Ferrand, Saint-Étienne & Dijon)
- Ligue Méditerranée (most of the Méditerranée coast: Marseille & Montpellier)
- Ligue de l'Est (Alsace & Lorraine)
- Ligue du Grand Nord (Northern part of France, including Picardy & Ardennes)

== Events ==
The FFG organises national events, and some for international players, for example:

- French Go Championship
- French Go Team Championship called the Coupe Maître Lim
- French Pair-go Championship
- Paris Go Tournament

== History ==
Association history

- 1970: Creation of the French Go Association. First French Championship organised.
- 1978: The French Go Association became the French Federation of Go following a vote by its clubs. Creation of the French Go Magazine (Revue Française de Go).
- 1985: Creation of leagues to encourage local development.
- 1991: The FFG obtained the agreement of the Ministry.

French tournaments history

The main French tournament is the Tournoi de go de Paris, but France is the host of many European and even international prestigious tournaments amongst which :

- 1978 : European Go Congress in Paris
- 1987 : European Go Congress in Grenoble
- 1997 : European Go Congress in Marseille
- 1998 : The European Youth Go Congress in Cannes
- 1999 : The European Youth Go Congress in Cannes
- 1999 : The Rengo European Go Championship in Cannes
- 2003 : The European Youth Go Congress in Cannes
- 2007 : The European Youth Masters Cup in Strasbourg
- 2007 : The Team European Championship in Cannes
- 2010 : The Female European Championship in Lyon
- 2011 : European Go Congress in Bordeaux
- 2011 : The Pandanet Go European Team Championship in Bordeaux
- 2012 : The Rengo European Go Championship in Lyon
- 2014 : The Student European Go Championship in Toulouse
- 2017 : The Youth European Go Championship in Grenoble
- 2017 : The Rengo European Go Championship in Strasbourg
- 2024 : European Go Congress in Toulouse
