= Zen (software) =

Zen, sold as Tencho no Igo (Japanese: 天頂の囲碁, literally Zenith Go) in Japan, is a closed source Go playing engine developed by Yoji Ojima (尾島陽児), a Japanese Go programmer.

== History to 2016 ==
Zen won a gold medal in 14th Computer Olympiad in May 2009. It won the Computer Go UEC Cup in 2011, 2014, and 2016.

In 2011, Zen19D reached 5 dan on the KGS Go Server, playing games of 15 seconds per move. The account which reached that rank uses a cluster version of Zen running on a 26-core machine.

In 2012, Zen beat Takemiya Masaki 9p by 11 points (it received five handicap stones), followed by a 20-point win (receiving four handicap stones) in the 6th E&C Symposium in Japan.

Zen defeated Kobayashi Koichi (Zen receiving three handicap stones) in the 4th Densei-sen on 23 March 2016.

Zen's first commercial version was released in Japan on 18 September 2009. Zen 2 was released on 27 August 2010, Zen 3 on 30 September 2011, Zen 4 on 27 July 2012, and Zen 5 on 13 December 2013.

== 2016 onwards: DeepZenGo ==
After the AlphaGo AI defeated professional players Fan Hui 2p and Lee Sedol 9p in 2015 and 2016, Yoji was inspired to upgrade Zen with deep learning algorithms. In November 2016, “DeepZenGo” played and lost a three-game match against Cho Chikun 9p; the AI won one game and lost the other two. Its win in that match made it the second Go-playing computer program (after AlphaGo) to win against a top human player without receiving handicap stones.

In March 2017, DeepZenGo played games against Mi Yuting, Park Junghwan, and Iyama Yuta, losing to Mi and Park, but defeating Iyama. Around the same time, DeepZenGo participated in the 2017 Computer Go UEC Cup, coming second behind Fine Art. Both programs then won their exhibition matches against Ichiriki Ryo, 7-dan Japanese professional.

== Example game ==
DeepZenGo (white) v. Ichiriki Ryo (26 March 2017), DeepZenGo won by resignation; Black's bottom left group is dead.

Go board, 19 by 19. Moves: 1 black Q16; 2 white Q4; 3 black C16; 4 white D4; 5 black J17; 6 white R14; 7 black O16; 8 white R17; 9 black R16; 10 white S16; 11 black C6; 12 white F3; 13 black D10; 14 white S18; 15 black E16; 16 white C17; 17 black D17; 18 white C15; 19 black B17; 20 white D12; 21 black F11; 22 white F13; 23 black H12; 24 white B16; 25 black C18; 26 white C10; 27 black C9; 28 white C11; 29 black B9; 30 white D9; 31 black E10; 32 white D8; 33 black E4; 34 white C7; 35 black D5; 36 white B7; 37 black E3; 38 white F4; 39 black F5; 40 white E2; 41 black D3; 42 white H4; 43 black G5; 44 white K3; 45 black R6; 46 white Q6; 47 black Q5; 48 white R5; 49 black P5; 50 white R7; 51 black R4; 52 white S6; 53 black S5; 55 black Q3; 56 white S4; 57 black P4; 58 white S3; 59 black M3; 60 white D2; 61 black C2; 62 white E6; 63 black E5; 64 white B2; 65 black C3; 66 white K16; 67 black K17; 68 white M16; 69 black Q14; 70 white Q13; 71 black P13; 72 white P14; 73 black O14; 74 white Q15; 75 black P15; 76 white P12; 78 white R15; 79 black L15; 80 white L16; 81 black H15; 82 white J14; 83 black L13; 84 white J16; 85 black H16; 86 white H17; 87 black G17; 88 white H18; 89 black G18; 90 white L17; 91 black J18; 92 white K18; 93 black H19; 94 white O18; 95 black K2; 96 white J2; 97 black L2; 98 white J6; 99 black H5.93258988919294141916178786567908243158584668068719101881797574788273726962283717020237628212613312927303236345011629846455235633943994947485343338425725156654137124459555864616040969597
First 99 moves (54 at 45, 77 at 69)

Go board, 19 by 19. Black stones: H19, C18, G18, J18, B17, D17, G17, J17, K17, C16, E16, H16, O16, Q16, R16, H15, L15, P15, O14, Q14, L13, P13, H12, F11, D10, E10, B9, C9, C6, D5, E5, F5, G5, H5, P5, Q5, S5, E4, P4, R4, C3, D3, E3, M3, Q3, C2, K2, L2. White stones: K18, O18, S18, L17, R17, B16, J16, K16, L16, M16, S16, C15, Q15, R15, J14, R14, F13, Q13, D12, P12, C11, C10, D9, D8, B7, C7, R7, E6, J6, Q6, R6, S6, R5, D4, F4, H4, S4, F3, K3, S3, B2, D2, E2, J2. Moves: 0 white J4; 1 black H2; 2 white G2; 3 black J1; 4 white H3; 5 black J3; 6 white J5; 7 black G4; 9 black P18; 10 white P17; 12 white G3; 13 black O17; 14 white N18; 15 black Q17; 16 white Q18; 17 black P16; 18 white P19; 19 black Q12; 20 white P14; 21 black R18; 22 white R19; 24 white R13; 25 black P10; 26 white O13; 28 white O12; 29 black Q11; 30 white N11; 31 black N13; 32 white O9; 33 black O10; 34 white N10; 35 black N9; 36 white M9; 37 black N8; 38 white L10; 39 black O8; 40 white K12; 41 black K13; 42 white J13; 43 black J12; 44 white L12; 45 black M12; 46 white J10; 47 black N15; 48 white K14; 49 black L14; 50 white N12; 51 black M15; 52 white M11; 53 black M13; 54 white F9; 55 black G9; 56 white G8; 57 black H9; 58 white J8; 59 black F8; 60 white G7; 61 black G13; 62 white B5.18221491621131015175147484920614241533126244340444550281952302946383433255455573635325956583739606267001245213
Moves 100-162 (108 at 96, 111 at 105, 123 at 69, 127 at 72)
