= Gian-Carlo Pascutto =

Belgian computer programmer (born 1982)

Gian-Carlo Pascutto (born 1982) is a Belgian computer programmer. He is the author of the chess engine Sjeng and Go software Leela, and the original author of the free and open-source Go software Leela Zero. Gian-Carlo also authored many core components of the foobar2000 media player.

In 2023 and 2024, Pascutto won World Computer Chess Championship organized by ICGA with his program, Stoofvlees.

He graduated from Hogeschool Gent in 2006, and has worked as a mobile platform engineer and manager at Mozilla Corporation since 2011.

Pascutto is a native of Ninove. He is married and has two children.
