= Paris Go Tournament =

- Full name: Tournoi de Go de Paris
- Started: 1972
- Prize money: Varies
- Affiliation: French Go Federation

Paris Go Tournament
- Full name: Finals of Toyota - IGS-PandaNet European Go Tour
- Started: 2001
- Defunct: 2007
- Prize money: Varies
- Affiliation: European Go Federation

Paris Go Tournament
- Full name: Pandanet Go European Finals
- Started: 2008
- Defunct: 2011
- Prize money: Varies
- Affiliation: European Go Federation

The Paris Go Tournament is a Go tournament organized by the French Go Federation.

The Pandanet Go European Finals were also held during the tournament, from 2008 to 2011.

== Awards (from 1979) ==
Year	Winner	Second	First European go-player	Notes
1979	(Netherlands) Zandweld	(Netherlands) Müller
1980	(France) Frédéric Donzet	(France) Pierre Aroutcheff
1981	(France) Frédéric Donzet	(France) André Moussa
1982	(Netherlands) Ronald Schlemper	(France) André Moussa
1983	(United Kingdom) Terry Stacey - (Japan) Hosokawa
1984	(South Korea) Yoo Jong-Su	(Austria) Hasibeder
1985	(South Korea) Lee	(France) André Moussa - (South Korea) Yoo Jong-Su
1986	(South Korea) Yoo Jong-Su	(France) André Moussa - (South Korea) Lee
1987	(France) André Moussa	(Netherlands) Robert Rehm - (South Korea) Yoo Jong-Su - (Japan) Maeda Norizatsu
1988	(South Korea) Yoo Jong-Su	(France) André Moussa
1989	?	?
1990	(China) Zhang Shutai	(Netherlands) Laurent Heiser
1991	(China) Zhang Shutai	(France) Jeff Séailles
1992	(China) Zhang Shutai	(China) Guo Juan	(France) Frédéric Donzet (4th)
1993	(China) Shen Guang-Ji	(China) Guo Juan	(France) Frédéric Donzet (5th)
1994	(China) Guo Juan	(China) Shen Guang-Ji	(France) Pierre Colmez (3rd)
1995	(China) Zhang Shutai	(China) Guo Juan	(France) Jeff Séailles (9th)
1996	(Japan) Miyakawa Wataru	(China) Dai Junfu	(France) Pierre Colmez (4th)
1997	(China) Guo Juan	(China) Zhang Shutai	(France) André Moussa (3rd)
1998	(China) Zhang Shutai	(South Korea) Lee Hyuk	(Germany) Christoph Gerlach (3rd)
1999	(China) Guo Juan	(Germany) Christoph Gerlach
2000	(China) Du Jingyu	(China) Zhao Pei	(Netherlands) Erik Puyt 4th)
2001	(China) Fan Hui	(China) Du Jingyu	(France) Jeff Séailles (5th)	Finals of "Toyota - IGS-PandaNet European Go Tour"
2002	(China) Fan Hui	(China) Du Jingyu	(Romania) Ion Florescu (5th)	Finals of "Toyota - IGS-PandaNet European Go Tour"
2003	(China) Fan Hui	(Hungary) Csaba Mérő		Finals of "Toyota - IGS-PandaNet European Go Tour"
2004	(China) Fan Hui	(France) Jeff Séailles		Finals of "Toyota - IGS-PandaNet European Go Tour"
2005	(China) Fan Hui	(Japan) Noguchi Motoki	(Germany) Benjamin Teuber (3rd)	Finals of "Toyota - IGS-PandaNet European Go Tour"
2006	(China) Bao Yun	(China) Fan Hui	(Romania) Cornel Burzo (4th)	Finals of "Toyota - IGS-PandaNet European Go Tour"
2007	(Japan) Nakano Yaushiro	(South Korea) Cho Seok Bin	(Netherlands) Kuin Merlijn (5th)	Finals of "Toyota - IGS-PandaNet European Go Tour"
2008	(China) Fan Hui	(China) Dai Junfu	(France) Paul Drouot (11th)	"Pandanet Go European Finals"
2009	(South Korea) Oh Chimin	(China) Fan Hui	(France) Antoine Fenech (4th)	"Pandanet Go European Finals"
2010	(China) Dai Junfu	(Hungary) Csaba Mero		"Pandanet Go European Finals"
2011	(China) Liu Yuanbo	(China) Xue Lei	(Hungary) Csaba Mérő	"Pandanet Go European Finals"
2012	(China) Dai Junfu	(France) Tanguy Le Calvé		40ème tournoi de Paris / 27ème tournoi d'Antony
2013	(China) Dai Junfu	(Spain) Oh Lluis		41ème tournoi de Paris

== See also ==
- List of Go organizations
