= László Mérő =

Hungarian psychologist and author (born 1949)

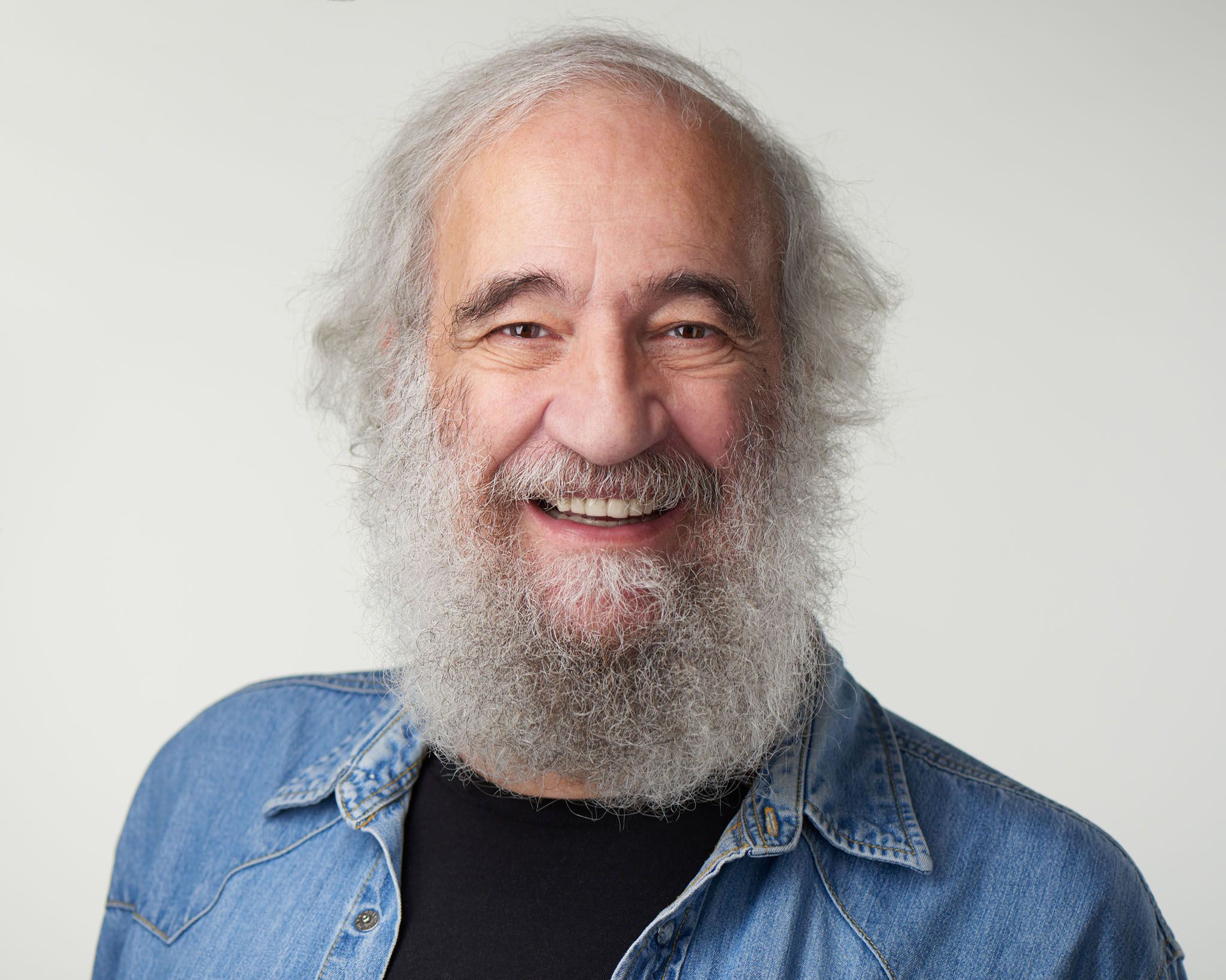

László Mérő (born Budapest, 11 December 1949) is a Hungarian research psychologist and popular science author. He has Jewish ancestry. He is a lecturer at the Experimental Psychology Department of Eötvös Loránd University and at the business school Kürt Academy. He is also a founder and leader of a software company producing computer games. One of his projects is a computer game he is developing with Ernő Rubik, the inventor of the Rubik's Cube. He is also the leader of the Hungarian team at the World Puzzle Championship. His son is Csaba Mérő, an 8-time Hungarian go champion. His daughter, Vera Mérő, is a human rights activist and author.

He represented Hungary in the Tenth International Mathematical Olympiad held in Moscow in 1968, and was awarded a bronze medal. He graduated from Eötvös Loránd University with a degree in mathematics in 1974. He spent the next ten years at the Computer and Automation Institute of the Hungarian Academy of Sciences, working on various pattern recognition and artificial intelligence projects. Recognizing the limitations of artificial intelligence, he began investigating human cognition. Since 1984 he has been at the Experimental Psychology Department of Eötvös Loránd University, studying cognitive psychology and psychophysics.

He has written two books, Ways of Thinking (newer translation: Habits of Mind) and Moral Calculations, that aroused the interest of the wider, non-professional public. His books analyze the quasi-rational mechanisms of people and the nature of rationality in general, undermining some common beliefs about our minds' functioning.

He has been publishing in Magyar Narancs a series titled Are you the dance instructor here? (The title refers to a joke: A client enters the dancing school and asks a well-dressed man: "Are you the dance instructor here?" "Fuck no, I'm the etiquette instructor!") Several of these essays were collected in a book in 2005 (see below).

== Volumes published in English ==
- Ways of Thinking : The Limits of Rational Thought and Artificial Intelligence (August/October 1990, hardcover: ISBN 981-02-0266-0, paperback: ISBN 981-02-0267-9)
  - A revised (rewritten) edition of the former:

Habits of Mind : The Power and Limits of Rational Thought (February 2002, ISBN 0-387-95077-X)

- Moral Calculations : Game Theory, Logic and Human Frailty (July 1998, ISBN 0-387-98419-4)

A lesser known book of his is Rubik's Puzzles : The Ultimate Brain Teaser Book (March 2000, ISBN 1-85868-790-X).

== Other language editions ==
His books (originally written in Hungarian) have been published in English, German, French, Italian, Spanish, and Croatian. The Moral Calculations was awarded the second prize as the Scientific Book of the Year in Germany in 1999.

- Ways of Thinking; Habits of Mind – Észjárások (Hungarian); Die Grenzen der Vernunft (German)
- Moral Calculations – Mindenki másképp egyforma (Hungarian); Optimal entschieden?; Die Logik der Unvernunft (German); Les aléas de la raison (French); Calcoli morali (Italian); Los azares de la razón (Spanish)
- Az élő pénz ("The living money", ISBN 963-8453-84-2) – as of 2006, only in Hungarian
- Maga itt a tánctanár? – Pszichológia, moralitás, játék és tudomány ("Are You the Dance Instructor Here? – Psychology, morality, game and science", ISBN 963-8453-97-4) – a collection of articles; as of 2006, only in Hungarian
- A csodák logikája – A kiszámíthatatlan tudománya ("Logic of Miracles: Making Sense of Rare, Really Rare, and Impossibly Rare Events", ISBN 978-0300224153) – Mathematical explanation of the recent phenomena of highly improbable events occurring in a large and turbulent world.

== See also ==
- John von Neumann
- Roger Penrose
- Douglas Hofstadter
