= Fine Art (software) =

Computer Go software developed by Tencent

Fine Art (Chinese: 绝艺; pinyin: Jué Yì) is a Go-playing computer program created by Chinese media company Tencent.

Development reportedly started in early 2016, around the time AlphaGo's successes, first against Fan Hui and later against Lee Sedol, showed that deep-learning neural networks combined with Monte Carlo algorithms were effective in computer Go. Fine Art reached the strength of human professionals by the end of 2016.

In March 2017, it won the Computer Go UEC Cup, against a field that included Zen, Crazy Stone and 27 others. AlphaGo did not participate. After its win, it played an exhibition game against Ichiriki Ryo, the Japanese 7-dan professional Go player. This game was played without handicap, and Fine Art won by resignation.

Fine Art has played many games on Fox, an Internet Go server, including several victories over Ke Jie, the world-number-1 Go player.

In the final match of the first AI Ryusei, Fine Art defeated DeepZenGo and won the championship on 10 December 2017.
