= Csaba Mérő =

Hungarian Go player

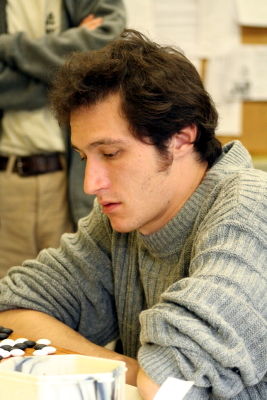

Personal information
- Born: July 7, 1979 (age 46) Budapest, Hungary

Sport
- Teacher: Chizu Kobayashi
- Rank: 6 dan (A)
- Affiliation: EGF

Csaba Mérő (born July 7, 1979 in Budapest, Hungary) is an amateur Go player.

== Biography ==
Mérő began playing Go when he was 14. He is the son of Hungarian mathematician László Mérő. By 1996 he had already won the European Youth Go Championship and Hungarian Championship. After he finished secondary school he moved to Japan in 1999. He was an insei there for two and a half years. His teacher was Chizu Kobayashi. He was given the chance to study with some of Japan's top players including Satoru Kobayashi and Cho U. After he failed the professional test, he moved back to Europe in 2001. After returning to Europe, a French summer Go camp invited Csaba to become an instructor for the summer. With his experience in Japan as an insei, Csaba came back much stronger and quickly rose to the top of the European standings. He studied sociology at ELTE university in Budapest between 2002 and 2007. He was the president of the Hungarian Go Association between 2006 and 2008.

== Past titles and Runners-up ==
Title	Years Held
(Europe) European Ing Cup	2003
(Europe) European Youth Go Championship	1996
(Hungary) Hungarian Championship	1996–1998, 2001–2005, 2008, 2012, 2018

Title	Years Lost
(Europe) Paris Toyota Denso Cup Finals	2003, 2010
