= Albert Lindsey Zobrist =

American computer scientist (born 1942)

Albert Lindsey Zobrist (born February 27, 1942) is an American computer scientist, games researcher, and inventor of the Zobrist Hashing. He also authored the first Go program in 1968 as part of his PhD thesis on pattern recognition at the Computer Science Department of the University of Wisconsin.

== Education ==
Albert Zobrist received his Bachelor of Science in Mathematics at the Massachusetts Institute of Technology in 1964 and a Masters in Mathematics and PhD in Computer Science from the University of Wisconsin–Madison in 1970.

== Computer chess ==
While affiliated with the University of Southern California and the Jet Propulsion Laboratory, Zobrist researched computer chess. With Frederic Roy Carlson and Charles Kalme, he co-authored the chess programs USC CP and Tyro, which participated at the ACM North American Computer Chess Championships (NACCC) in 1977.
