= Subject-matter expert =

Authority in a particular area or topic

A subject-matter expert (SME) is a person who has accumulated great expertise in a particular field or topic, which expertise is reflected by the person's degree, licensure, and/or years' occupational experience in the subject. For example, a PhD in chemistry may easily qualify as an SME in chemistry, a person with a Second Class Radiotelegraph License or equivalent issued by the national licensing body is an SME in radiotelegraphy, a person with a master's degree in electronic engineering is an SME in electronics, and a person with many years' experience in machining is an SME in that field.

The term is used when those developing materials about a topic (a book, an examination, a manual, etc.) need expertise on that topic. For example, tests are often created by a team of psychometricians and a team of SMEs. The psychometricians understand how to engineer a test, while the SMEs understand the actual content of the exam. Books, manuals, and technical documentation are developed by technical writers and instructional designers in conjunctions with SMEs. Technical communicators interview SMEs to extract information and convert it into a form suitable for the audience. SMEs are often required to sign off on the documents or training developed, checking it for technical accuracy. SMEs are also necessary for the development of training materials.

== By field ==
Examples of SMEs in various fields include:

- in pharmaceutical and biotechnology areas, ASTM International's standard E2500 specifies SMEs for various functions in project and process management. In one project, there may be many SMEs who are experts on air, water, utilities, process machines, process, packaging, storage, distribution and supply chain management.
  "Subject Matter Experts are defined as those individuals with specific expertise and responsibility in a particular area or field (for example, quality unit, engineering, automation, development, operations). Subject Matter Experts should take the lead role in the verification of manufacturing systems as appropriate within their area of expertise and responsibility." —ASTM E2500 §6.7.1 and §6.7.2.
- in engineering and technical fields, a SME is the one who is an authority in the design concept as well as interior design, calculations and performance of a system or process.
- in scientific and academic fields, SMEs are recruited to perform peer reviews, and are used as oversight personnel to review reports in the accounting and financial fields.
- a lawyer in an administrative agency may be designated an SME if they specialize in a particular field of law, such as tort, intellectual property rights, etc. A law firm may seek out and use a SME as an expert witness.
- in electronic discovery environments, the term "SME" labels professionals with expertise using computer-assisted reviewing technology and technology-assisted review (TAR) to perform searches designed to produce precisely refined results that identify groups of data as potentially responsive or nonresponsive to relevant issues. E-discovery SMEs also typically have experience in constructing the search strings used in the search. It also refers to experts used to "train" the TAR systems.
- in artificial intelligence and machine learning, SMEs play a vital role in reinforcement learning from human feedback (RLHF) and post-training evaluation. As frontier models approach performance ceilings on standard benchmarks, the industry focus has shifted from high-volume data collection by generalist crowd-workers to specialized evaluation. In complex domains such as law, medicine, and advanced engineering, verifying model outputs requires formal professional training and normative judgment to mitigate hallucinations and ensure factual reliability, leading to dedicated roles for credentialed professionals.

== Domain expert (software) ==
A domain expert is frequently used in expert systems software development, and there the term always refers to the domain other than the software domain. A domain expert is a person with special knowledge or skills in a particular area of endeavour (e.g. an accountant is an expert in the domain of accountancy). The development of accounting software requires knowledge in two different domains: accounting and software. Some of the development workers may be experts in one domain and not the other.

In software engineering environments, the term is used to describe professionals with expertise in the field of application. The term "SME" also has a broader definition in engineering and high tech as one who has the greatest expertise in a technical topic. SMEs are often asked to review, improve, and approve technical work; to guide others; and to teach. According to Six Sigma, a SME "exhibits the highest level of expertise in performing a specialized job, task, or skill of broad definition."

In software development, as in the development of "complex computer systems" (e.g., artificial intelligence, expert systems, control, simulation, or business software), an SME is a person who is knowledgeable about the domain being represented (but often not knowledgeable about the programming technology used to represent it in the system). The SME tells the software developers what needs to be done by the computer system, and how the SME intends to use it. The SME may interact directly with the system, possibly through a simplified interface, or may codify domain knowledge for use by knowledge engineers or ontologists. An SME is also involved in validating the resulting system. SME has formal meaning in certain contexts, such as Capability Maturity Models.

== Technical writing advisors ==
In most medium- to large-size engineering or science-related organizations, SMEs are assigned to collect-and-provide and/or review-and-approve the necessary project assets a technical writer will need to accurately write a project document (e.g., user manual, installation manual, service bulletin, etc.). In most cases, SMEs collect and/or create all of the engineering-approved documentation assets required for a technical writer during a project's research and/or development phase. Assets required for accurate technical writing may include an outline, graphic drafts, CAD models, data, unique reference material locations, and any additional project information a technical writer is not expected to know. The SME either delivers this information to the technical writer before or on the day a document is assigned or the SME reviews the documentation assets the technical writer collects independently before a document is assigned. SMEs continue to support the technical writer throughout the documentation process with project change information and by providing answers to any project questions a technical writer may have. When a document is complete, the SME will provide a final review focused specifically on accuracy. The review may include the SME's sign-off or mark-ups for accuracy errors. The SME review serves as the final step in a standardized engineering document-review process.

In larger organizations, SMEs are often assigned limited engineering roles and the focus of their work is technical writing support. In smaller organizations, SMEs may be assigned a reduced level of engineering work so they may provide technical writing support when work allows. Some organizations do not have technical writers and rely on SMEs to perform this function for their assigned projects. However, this is less common in organizations where new projects or revisions are implemented weekly.

Web development and software organizations are slow to adopt the standardized engineering role for SMEs. In part, because web development and software organizations program unusually short development cycles for large volumes of content. As a result, many web development and software organizations invented their own simpler, non-standardized, peer-review processes as start-ups. Often, these organizations continue to rely on this quicker system for release, even as they grow. This system allows web development and software organizations to produce and deliver more content but with little to no formal revision control for content releases (i.e. a living document). In addition, web development and software organizations do not typically face the same liabilities for inaccurate documentation as other engineering and science organizations. The few that do follow a standardized engineering processes, which require SME review and approval, as a measure to protect customers from inaccurate documentation and reduce organization risks and liabilities.

== See also ==
- Advisor
- Consultant
- Domain knowledge – Specialist knowledge within a specific field
- Knowledge engineering
- Professional
- Subject-matter expert Turing test
