= Rémi Coulom =

French computer scientist (born 1974)

Rémi Coulom (born 1974) is a French computer scientist, once an assistant professor of computer science at the Lille 3 University, and the developer of Crazy Stone, a computer Go program.

In 2006, Rémi Coulom described the application of the Monte Carlo method to game-tree search and coined the term Monte Carlo tree search in his paper, "Efficient Selectivity and Backup Operators in Monte-Carlo Tree Search". He was one of the research supervisors of Aja Huang, who later led the Google DeepMind team that developed AlphaGo. Coulom developed the Whole History Rating system and founded goratings.org, a website providing unofficial historical ratings of Go players in the world.
