= Computer Go UEC Cup =

Annual computer Go tournament

The Computer Go UEC Cup is an annual worldwide computer Go tournament held at the University of Electro-Communications (UEC) in Tokyo, Japan, since 2007. The winners of the tournament would then play exhibition games against a professional Go player.

The tournament was typically structured as a preliminary Swiss-system invitational to determine challengers (with the previous year's UEC winners excluded), then a knockout tournament of sixteen players to determine the champion.

UEC Cup was terminated after its 10th edition in 2017 and was succeeded by AI Ryusei, a new computer Go tournament sponsored by Japanese Igo & Shogi Channel. In 2019, the University of Electro-Communications hosted the renewed 11th UEC Cup with new sponsors.

== History ==
UEC Cup winners and runners-up

No.	Time	Winner	Runner-up
1st	1–2 December 2007	Crazy Stone	Katsunari
2nd	13–14 December 2008	Crazy Stone	不動碁
3rd	28–29 November 2009	KCC Go	Katsunari
4th	27–28 November 2010	Fuego	Zen
5th	3–4 December 2011	Zen	Erica
6th	16–17 March 2013	Crazy Stone	Zen
7th	15–16 March 2014	Zen	Crazy Stone
8th	14–15 March 2015	Crazy Stone	DolBaram
9th	19–20 March 2016	Zen	darkforest
10th	18–19 March 2017	Fine Art	DeepZenGo
11th	14–15 December 2019	Golaxy	AQZ
12th	20-21 March 2021	VisionGo	Ranka Go

Exhibition games against professional Go players

Year	Position	Program	Handicap	Professional player	Result
2008	Winner	Crazy Stone	7 stones	Kaori Aoba (4p)	Crazy Stone won by resignation
2009	3rd place	Zen	6 stones	Kaori Aoba (4p)	Kaori Aoba won by resignation
	Winner	KCC Go	6 stones	鄭銘瑝 (9p)	鄭 won by resignation
2010	Runner-up	Zen	6 stones	Kaori Aoba (4p)	Zen won by resignation
	Winner	Fuego	6 stones	鄭銘瑝 (9p)	鄭 won by resignation
2011	Runner-up	Erica	6 stones	Chizu Kobayashi (5p)	Chizu Kobayashi won by resignation
	Winner	Zen	6 stones	鄭銘瑝 (9p)	Zen won by resignation
2013	Runner-up	Zen	4 stones	Yoshio Ishida (9p)	Yoshio Ishida won by resignation
	Winner	Crazy Stone	4 stones	Yoshio Ishida	Crazy Stone won by 2.5 points
2014	Runner-up	Crazy Stone	4 stones	Norimoto Yoda (9p)	Crazy Stone won by 2.5 points
	Winner	Zen	4 stones	Norimoto Yoda	Norimoto Yoda won by resignation
2015	Runner-up	DolBaram	4 stones	Cho Chikun (9p)	DolBaram won by resignation
	Winner	Crazy Stone	3 stones	Cho Chikun	Cho Chikun won by resignation
2016	Runner-up	darkforest	3 stones	Koichi Kobayashi (9p)	Koichi Kobayashi won by resignation
	Winner	Zen	3 stones	Koichi Kobayashi	Zen won by resignation
2017	Runner-up	DeepZenGo	even	Ichiriki Ryo (7p)	DeepZenGo won by resignation
	Winner	Fine Art	even	Ichiriki Ryo	Fine Art won by resignation
