= Crazy Stone (software) =

Go playing engine

Crazy Stone (Champion Go on iOS and Android platforms) is a Go playing engine, developed by Rémi Coulom, a French computer scientist. It is one of the first computer Go programs to utilize a modern variant of the Monte Carlo tree search. It is part of the Computer Go effort. In January 2012 Crazy Stone was rated as 5 dan on KGS, in March 2014 as 6 dan.

== History ==
Coulom began writing Crazy Stone in July 2005, and at the outset incorporated the Monte Carlo algorithm in its design. Early versions were initially available to download as freeware from his website, albeit no longer. Pattern recognition and searching was added in 2006, and later that year Crazy Stone took part in its first tournament, winning a gold medal in the 9×9 competition at the 11th Computer Olympiad. Coulom subsequently entered the program into the 12th Computer Olympiad the following year, winning bronze in the 9x9 and silver in the 19×19 competitions.

However, Crazy Stone's most significant accomplishment was to defeat Kaori Aoba, a professional Japanese 4 dan, in an 8-stone handicap match in 2008. In doing so, the engine became the first to officially defeat an active professional in Japan with a handicap of less than nine stones. Three months later, on 12 December 2008, Crazy Stone defeated Aoba again in a 7-stone match.

In March 2013, Crazy Stone beat Yoshio Ishida, Japanese 9-dan former Honinbo Meijin, in a 19×19 game with four handicap stones.

On March 21, 2014, at the second annual Densei-sen competition, Crazy Stone defeated Norimoto Yoda, Japanese professional 9-dan, in a 19×19 game with four handicap stones by a margin of 2.5 points.

== Performance ==
- 29/05/2006 - Gold medal in the 9x9 tournament at the 11th Computer Olympiad, Turin.
- 01/06/2006 - Finished 5th in the 19x19 tournament at the 11th Computer Olympiad, Turin.
- 13/06/2007 - Bronze medal in the 9x9 tournament at the 12th Computer Olympiad, Amsterdam.
- 17/06/2007 - Silver medal in the 19x19 tournament at the 12th Computer Olympiad, Amsterdam.
- 02/12/2007 - Won the first Computer Go UEC Cup.
- 04/09/2008 - Defeated Kaori Aoba in an 8-stone handicap match.
- 14/12/2008 - Won the second Computer Go UEC Cup.
- 14/12/2008 - Defeated Kaori Aoba in a 7-stone handicap match.
- 29/11/2009 - Finished 9th in the third Computer Go UEC Cup.
