= Internet Go server =

Online servers allowing users to play Go

An Internet Go server is a server that allows players of the game of Go to play against opponents online. The two fundamental types of Go server are real-time servers and turn-based servers.

== History ==
The first Go server that started operating is the Internet Go Server (IGS), which began service in 1992 and is still active as of 2026. Several other servers, all with the same basic server-client architecture, followed.

IGS was started on February 2, 1992, by Tim Casey, Chris Chisolm, and Mark Okada, working at the University of New Mexico, and until April 5, 1993, continued at the University of California, Berkeley, and UC San Francisco (with an additional server at The Pasteur Institute, France); it was the first server of its kind. After its initial inception, some of its members helped to improve the server by writing software with a graphical interface; and thus IGS was born. IGS hosts up to 3,000 players at a time, depending on the time of day.

Leaving the UC servers in 1993, IGS continued at the University of Pennsylvania for a year until being bought by the Korean ISP nuri.net in 1994. In 1995, the Japanese company NKB Inc., a partner of nuri.net, acquired IGS, and created a separate department, named "Pandanet" in 1996, with Mark Okada as manager. Pandanet has managed IGS ever since; in 1998 renaming it to "IGS Pandanet," which was shortened to "Pandanet" in Japan.

== Real-time servers ==
Real-time Go servers allow players to play against other in real time when both are online at the same time. Generally, this involves a set-up where both players use a client program to connect to the server, which then relays the moves from player to player. The server also keeps track of time controls, calculates the score and, if applicable, calculates ratings for the players based on their results. Such servers require players to download a client program, and many such programs have been developed for a wide range of platforms. Around 2000, Kiseido publishing started the Kiseido Go Server (KGS), which allowed players to play without downloading a client by utilizing a Java applet in the web browser. This server quickly became popular and still is as of 2015. IGS and KGS are currently (2014) the most popular servers for the English-speaking audience. As of 2014, Online Go Server (OGS) handles both real-time and turn-based games straight from one's web-browser. PlayGo, a browser and mobile server launched in 2026, hosts professional events online, including a 2026 "Battle of the Sexes" match between Shin Jin-seo, Kim Ji-seok, Choi Jeong and Kim Eun-ji.

== Turn-based servers ==
Turn-based servers do not require opponents to be online at the same time. Instead, a player records a move with the server, and the server will present this move to the opponent the next time they connect to the server. This way, players need never be online simultaneously and can still play against each other. Turn-based servers also keep track of time controls, but these are generally measured in days, instead of minutes, as is customary on real-time servers. Dragon Go Server (DGS) (2001) and the newer Online Go Server (OGS) were, as of 2011, the most popular turn-based go servers.
