= Pandanet =

Pandanet (originally and sometimes called IGS, short for Internet Go Server), located in Tokyo, Japan, is a server that allows players of the game of Go to observe and play against others over the Internet. Started February 2, 1992, by Tim Casey, Chris Chisolm, and Mark Okada, working out of the University of New Mexico, and until April 5, 1993, continued at the University of California, Berkeley, and UC San Francisco (with an additional server at The Pasteur Institute, France), it was the first server of its kind. After its initial inception some of its members helped to improve the server by writing software with a graphical interface; and thus IGS was born. Pandanet hosts up to 3,000 players at a time, depending on the time of day. Its PC client's name is GoPanda.

== History ==
IGS was first opened to the public in February 1992. The first server was located at the University of New Mexico. Within the first year, two more servers were deployed, one at the University of California at Berkeley and one at the Pasteur Institute in Paris, France. Leaving the UC servers in 1993, it continued at the University of Pennsylvania for a year until being bought by the Korean ISP nuri.net in 1994. In 1995, the Japanese company NKB Inc., a partner of nuri.net, acquired IGS, and created the division "Pandanet" in 1996, which has managed IGS since.

The first professional player to sign-on to IGS was Jiang Zhujiu -9 dan-, on April 24, 1992, which started the trend of high level dan player membership that continues to this very day. Through the months of July and August of that year the first professional tournament was hosted, with over 300 games played.

In September of that year Japan's famous Meijin Sen tournament was displayed live on IGS to an audience from many nations. Played in an Amsterdam hotel room by Kobayashi Koichi and Otake Hideo, the game was typed play-by-play by users jansteen and AshaiRey respectively, while watching the game on TV. It was witnessed by over 100 observers on IGS and took 16 hours to complete.

A translation command was added to the server in December 1992, allowing users to better communicate with one another, and to translate the long list of commands required to run the early versions of the software.

== Other activities ==
Besides being a Go server, Pandanet also hosts several art galleries. The main gallery contains Japanese and Chinese art that has a Go-related theme. Other galleries deal with vintage Go photographs and photography from the 19th and early 20th century, related to San Francisco and Chinatown.

Pandanet broadcasts live championship matches for top professional events, including the Meijin, Honinbo, and Judan titles, and the Ricoh Cup professional Pairs tournament.

== See also ==
- Go competitions
- KGS Go Server
