= Sjeng (software) =

Chess engine

- Original author(s): Gian-Carlo Pascutto
- Developer(s): Gian-Carlo Pascutto
- Stable release: 3.0
- Repository: github.com/gcp/sjeng
- Written in: C
- Type: chess engine
- License: GPLv2
- Website: www.sjeng.org

Sjeng is a chess engine written by Gian-Carlo Pascutto based on Faile, written by Adrien Regimbald. There are two major versions of Sjeng: the original open source version called Sjeng (also now known as Sjeng old or Sjeng free) and Deep Sjeng, a closed source commercial version.

== Sjeng ‘Free’ ==
According to the Sjeng website “Sjeng was written by Gian-Carlo Pascutto with help from Adrien Regimbald, Daniel Clausen, Dann Corbit, Lenny Taelman, Ben Nye, Ronald De Man, David Dawson, Tim Foden and Georg von Zimmermann.” The AUTHORS file in the Sjeng distribution states that “Sjeng is written by Gian-Carlo Pascutto, based on work done by Adrien Regimbald.”

Unlike most other chess engines Sjeng supports several popular chess variants: Crazyhouse, Suicide, Losers and, when playing on a chess server, Bughouse. Starting with Mac OSX 10.4 Sjeng has been distributed as the engine behind the graphical “Chess” Mac application.

The first version with source code under the GPL was Sjeng 7 released to SourceForge on 4/15/2000. The last open source version was Sjeng 11.2, released on 1/2/2002. With version 12 Sjeng went back to being closed source, although still free. Version 12 contained many changes, including a switch to bitboard architecture and the removal of variant support. Version 12.7 was released concurrently with version 11.2 on 1/2/2002. Several more versions were released culminating with version 12.13 on 5/3/2002.

== Deep Sjeng ==
The next iteration of the chess engine was named Deep Sjeng 1.0 and released as a commercial program on 3/3/2003. It featured multiprocessor support and was estimated to be 200 rating points stronger than Sjeng Free. The last version of Deep Sjeng won the World Computer Speed Chess Championship in 2008. Deep Sjeng is no longer for sale.

== Tournaments ==
Deep Sjeng participated in six World Computer Chess Championships, then retired after tying for first place in the 17th Championship. Deep Sjeng actually tied for second place, however the winner, Rybka, was disqualified for plagiarism.

Sjeng won the World Computer Speed Chess Championship in 2008, and the World Computer Chess Championship in 2009. It also won the Internet Computer Chess Tournament in 2010 and 2011.
