= Go software =

Software playing the board game Go

There is an abundance of go software available to support players of the game of Go. This includes software programs that play Go themselves, programs that can be used to view and/or edit game records and diagrams, programs that allow the user to search for patterns in the games of strong players and programs that allow users to play against each other over the Internet.

== Go playing programs ==
With the advent of AlphaGo in 2016, computer programs can beat top professional players on the standard 19x19 board. A more in depth look into Go playing programs and the research behind them can be found in the article on computer Go.

== Recording ==
There are several file formats used to store game records, the most popular of which is the Smart Game Format (SGF). Programs used for editing game records allow the user to record not just the moves, but also variations, commentary and further information on the game.

== Databases ==
Electronic databases can be used to study life and death situations, joseki, fuseki and games by a particular player. Available programs give players pattern searching options, which allows a player to research positions by searching for high level games in which similar situations occur. Such software will generally list common follow up moves that have been played by professionals, and give statistics on win–loss ratio in opening situations.

== Internet servers and clients ==
Many Internet-based Go servers allow access to competition with players all over the world. Such servers also allow easy access to professional teaching, with both teaching games and interactive game review being possible.

The first Go server that started operating is the Internet Go Server (IGS), which began service in 1992 and is still active today. Several other servers, all with the same basic server-client architecture, followed. Such servers required players to download a client program, and many such programs were therefore developed for a wide range of platforms. Around 2000, Kiseido publishing started the Kiseido Go Server (KGS), which allowed players to play without downloading a client by utilizing a Java applet in the web browser. This server quickly became popular and still is today. IGS and KGS were as of 2007 the most popular real-time go servers for the English speaking audience. Online Go Server (OGS) and Dragon Go Server (DGS) were as of 2011 the most popular turn-based go servers.

== See also ==
- Hikarunix, a Linux distribution focused on Go
- Sensei's Library, contains lists of Internet Go servers, Go playing, game record editing, and database programs
