= KGS Go Server =

21st-century game server

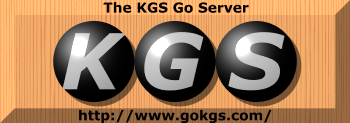
The KGS Go Server

The KGS Go Server, known until 2006 as the Kiseido Go Server, is a game server first developed in 1999 and established in 2000 for people to play Go. The system was developed by William M. Shubert and its code is now written entirely in Java. In Spring of 2017, Shubert transferred ownership to the American Go Foundation.

A list of the top 100 players, sorted by KGS calculated rank, is regularly updated and maintained.

International tournament games and national championship games are relayed on this server. Monthly Computer Go tournaments are held in the Computer Go room on KGS.

The KGS Go Server is distinguished by a kibitz culture. Kibitzes are common and popular in high-level games, and may include off-topic discussions though this is discouraged by the administrators. The two players cannot see kibitzers' comments until after the game.

There are several client programs to connect to KGS. CGoban 3 is for normal use, on any system that supports Java. As of 2018, it supports 30 languages. CGoban 3 can also be used as a Smart Game Format (SGF) file editor and viewer. kgsGtp is another java program, for use by Go-playing programs. KGS Client for Android is for mobile phones that use the Android operating system; it supports several languages, but not as many as CGoban 3. KGS used to offer a Java applet version of CGoban, but applet support was removed in early 2016 or late 2015.

KGS allows games on any square size board from 2x2 up to 38x38, including the 19x19, 13x13 and 9x9 boards. There are several game types offered on KGS:

- Ranked, which are used for KGS ratings calculations. Only games played on 19x19 boards can be ranked, and only if both players use the rank option. The rest of the game types in this list are non-ranked.
- Free, which are not used in KGS ratings calculations.
- Teaching games, which allow the player with white stones to initiate exploration of alternative lines of play.
- Rengo, which are for two pairs of players.
- Simul, in which one player plays 2 or more games at the same time.
- Tournament, with pairings managed by the KGS tournament system.
- Demo, in which one person plays both black and white stones, and may have alternative lines of play. Demo games are used for reviews, lectures and lessons, as well as relaying non-KGS games of interest. Relay of non-KGS games requires permission of the source, and advance notice.

In addition, non-ranked games may be marked private.

KGS offers 4 time controls: None, Absolute, Canadian, and Byo-yomi.

Correspondence type games are possible if both players are present at the start of the game, "None" is used for time control, and the game type is free. However, they should be completed within 6 months, since the server will automatically delete games when they are 6 months old.

The players on KGS may be rated, using levels from 30 kyu to 9 dan, according to their results in ranked games. In addition, certified professional players may use their professional ranks.

In October 2015, AlphaGo from DeepMind beat the European Go champion Fan Hui five to zero. 29.4 million positions from 160,000 games from KGS's game archive, played by 6 to 9 dan human players, were used to train AlphaGo's policy network.

== See also ==
- IGS Go server
