= Cho Nam-chul =

South Korean Go player (1923–2006)

Cho Namchul
Personal information
- Native name: 조남철 (Korean); 趙南哲 (Korean)
- Born: November 30, 1923 Buan, Zenrahoku-dō, Korea, Empire of Japan
- Died: July 2, 2006, aged 83

Sport
- Teacher: Kitani Minoru
- Rank: 9 dan
- Affiliation: Hanguk Kiwon

Cho Namchul (Korean: 조남철; November 30, 1923 – July 2, 2006, alternately Cho Namcheol) was a professional Go player (Baduk in Korean). He died of natural causes in Seoul at the age of 83.

== Biography ==
Cho was born in a farming village in Buan, Zenrahoku-dō, Korea, Empire of Japan. In 1934, Japanese professional Kitani Minoru visited Korea and played with ten-year-old Cho, who deeply impressed the great master. He went to Japan in 1937 to study go as Kitani's first insei, or live-in student. In 1943, he returned to Korea and played a key role in the founding of the Hanguk Kiwon. It wasn't until 1983, that he would be awarded 9 dan, but for most of the 1950s and 1960s, he won the vast majority of national tournaments.

He is known as the founder of Korean modern Go. Namchul is also the uncle of the top Japanese Go title holder Cho Chikun.

After his death, he was honored by the president of Korea with a medal and floral tribute.

== Titles and runners-up ==
Ranks #7 in total number of titles in Korea.

Title	Years Held
Current	9
(South Korea) Guksu	1956–1964
Defunct	13
(South Korea) Myungin	1968, 1970
(South Korea) Chaegowi	1959–1962, 1964, 1965, 1966
(South Korea) Paewang	1959–1962

Title	Years Lost
Current	7
(South Korea) Wangwi	1966, 1969, 1970, 1972
(South Korea) Guksu	1965, 1968, 1970
Defunct	4
(South Korea) Myungin	1971, 1974
(South Korea) Paewang	1970
(South Korea) Chaegowi	1967
