= Daejoo Cup =

South Korean Go competition

The Daejoo Cup (also known as the Large Boat Senior Cup) is a Go competition in Korea. It is sponsored by the Daejoo Group.

The winner's prize is 15 million won and the runner-up's prize is 5 million won (as of 2025).

== Past winners and runners-up ==
Daejoo Cup
No.	Year	Winner	Score	Runner-up
1	2010	Cho Hun-hyun	2–0	Seo Bongsoo
2	2011	Seo Neung-uk	1–0	Cho Hun-hyun
3	2012	Seo Neung-uk	1–0	Seo Bongsoo
4	2013	Cho Hun-hyun	1–0	Choi Gyu-byeong
5	2018	Cho Chikun	1–0	Cho Hye-yeon
6	2019	Choi Gyu-byeong	1–0	Cho Hye-yeon
7	2020	Cho Hye-yeon	1–0	Kim Yeong-hwan
8	2021	Seo Bongsoo	1–0	Yoo Chang-hyuk
9	2022	Kim Hye-min	1–0	Lee Min-jin
10	2023	Yoo Chang-hyuk	1–0	Kwon Hyo-jin
11	2024	Seo Bongsoo	1–0	Han Jong-jin
12	2025	Yoo Chang-hyuk	1–0	Lee Changho
13	2026	Choi Myeong-hun	1–0	Moon Jin-seok
