= Ha Chan-seok =

South Korean Go player

Ha Chanseok
Personal information
- Native name: 하찬석 (Korean); 河燦錫 (Korean); Ha Ch'ansŏk (McCune–Reischauer)
- Born: December 20, 1948 South Korea
- Died: September 14, 2010 (aged 61)

Sport
- Teacher: Minoru Kitani
- Rank: 9 dan
- Affiliation: Hanguk Kiwon

Ha Chanseok (Korean: 하찬석; December 20, 1948 – September 14, 2010) was a professional Go player.

== Biography ==
Ha became an 8 dan in 1987, and 9 dan in 2003.

== Titles & runners-up ==
Title	Years Held
Current	4
(South Korea) Wangwi	1973
(South Korea) Guksu	1973, 1974
(South Korea) KBS Baduk Wang	1986
Defunct	1
(South Korea) Baccus Cup	1985

Title	Years Lost
Current	6
(South Korea) Guksu	1976, 1978, 1979
(South Korea) Chaegowi	1976, 1978, 1985
Defunct	3
(South Korea) Paewang	1979
(South Korea) Gukgi	1978
(South Korea) Kiwang	1975
