= Hamgyong =

Hamgyong, Hamgyŏng or Hamyeong may also refer to:

- North Hamgyong Province, a province of North Korea
- South Hamgyong Province, a province of North Korea
- Hamgyong Province, a province of the historical state Joseon
