= 京畿道 =

京畿道 may refer to:

- Gyeonggi Province, a province in South Korea
- Jingji Circuit (Tang dynasty), a Tang dynasty circuit around its capital Chang'an
- Keiki-dō, former Korean province, one of the administrative divisions of Korea under Japanese rule
