= Cheol-min =

- Hangul: 철민
- RR: Cheolmin
- MR: Ch'ŏlmin

Cheol-min, also spelled Chol-min or Chul-min, is a Korean given name.

People with this name include:

- Kang Cheol-min (1939–2002), South Korean go player
- Park Chul-min (born 1967), South Korean actor
- Jang Chul-min (born 1972), a South Korean football player
- Pak Chol-min (judoka) (born 1982), North Korean judo practitioner
- Pak Chol-min (footballer) (born 1988), a North Korean football player
- Baek Chul-min (born 1992), a South Korean actor and model
- Kim Cheol-min (born in 1992)is, a South Korean speed skater

== See also ==
- List of Korean given names
