= Mingjiu Jiang =

Chinese Go player

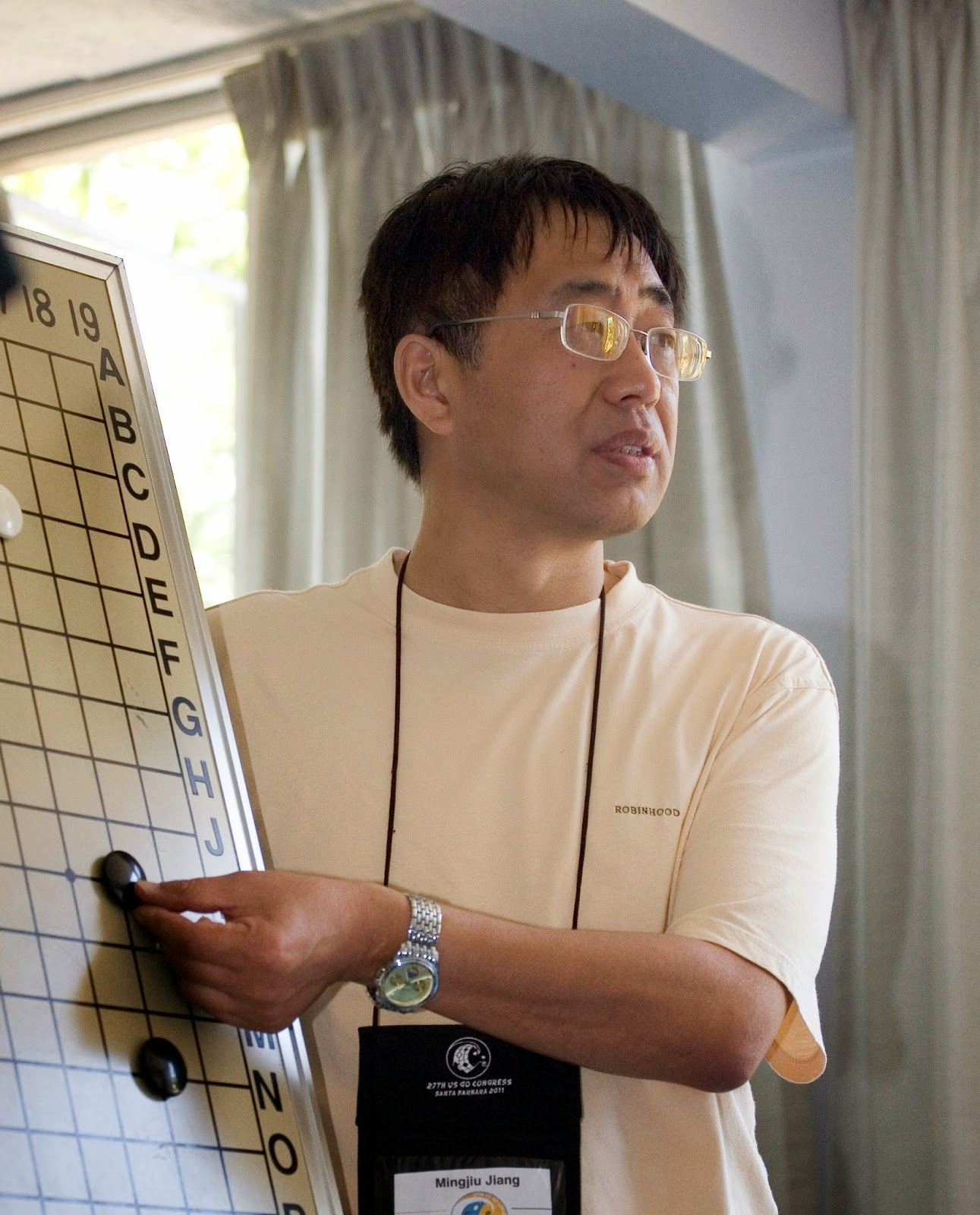
- Mingjiu Jiang in 2011

Personal information
- Native name: 江鳴久 (Chinese); Jiāng Míngjiǔ (Pinyin)
- Full name: Mingjiu Jiang
- Born: July 15, 1957 (age 68) Shandong, China

Sport
- Turned pro: 1985 (full time)
- Rank: 7 dan
- Affiliation: Chinese Weiqi Association (1985-19??); American Go Association (19??-present)

Mingjiu Jiang (simplified Chinese: 江鸣久; traditional Chinese: 江鳴久; pinyin: Jiāng Míngjiǔ, born July 15, 1957, in Shandong, China) is a Chinese professional Go player and the elder brother of Jiang Zhujiu.

== Biography ==
Jiang became 6 dan in 1982 and 7 dan in 1987. He has played for the Zhongguo Qiyuan, but currently resides in and represents the United States of America. He has represented North America in several international competitions. In 2010, he played in the Chunlan Cup, losing to Gu Lingyi in the first round. Since 2011, he has mainly taught Go and has published two books on the game. He also collaborates with Guo Juan on the Internet Go School.

California State Senator Leland Yee came to the San Francisco Go Club on 18 July 2010 to present Jiang with a Certificate of Recognition from the California State Senate in honor of the Ing Chang-ki Goe Foundation and its continued sponsorship of the World Youth Goe Championship. That year's contestants were both students of Jiang and he accompanied them to Penghu for the tournament with Paul Barchilon. Jiang presented the Certificate to Ing Ming Hao and Yang Yu Chia of the Ing Foundation at the opening ceremonies of the tournament.

== Past runners-up ==
Title	Years Lost
Defunct	1
(United States) North American Masters Tournament	2001
Current	1
(United States) North American Ing Masters Tournament	2009

== Past Titles ==
Title	Years Lost
Current	1
(United States) North American Ing Masters Tournament	2007

== Bibliography ==
- Punishing and Correcting Joseki Mistakes. (with Adam Miller) ISBN 1-932001-14-X
- Brighton: The International Chess Tournaments (with Guo Juan). ISBN 1-84382-141-9
