= 全羅北道 =

全羅北道 may refer to:

- North Jeolla Province
- Zenrahoku-dō
