= 慶尚北道 =

慶尚北道 may refer to:

- Keishōhoku-dō
- North Gyeongsang Province
