= Kim In =

South Korean Go player (1943–2021)

Personal information
- Native name: 김인 (Korean); 金寅 (Korean)
- Full name: Kim In
- Born: November 23, 1943 Gangjin County, Korea, Empire of Japan
- Died: April 4, 2021 (aged 77)

Sport
- Turned pro: 1958
- Teacher: Minoru Kitani
- Rank: 9 dan
- Affiliation: Hanguk Kiwon

Kim In (November 23, 1943 – April 4, 2021) was a South Korean professional Go player.

== Biography ==
Kim In became a professional in 1958 when he was 15. He was a student at the legendary Minoru Kitani school in 1962 and left to return home a year later. He was promoted to 9 dan in 1983, and was the third ever 9 dan in Korea. He was famous for his playing in the 1960s and 1970s. Until his death he was managing director for the Hanguk Kiwon.

== Promotion record ==
Rank	Year	Notes
1 dan	1958	
2 dan		
3 dan		
4 dan		
5 dan		
6 dan		
7 dan		
8 dan		
9 dan	1983	

== Titles & runners-up ==
Ranks #3 in total number of titles in Korea.

Title	Years Held
Current	13
(South Korea) Wangwi	1966–1972
(South Korea) Guksu	1965–1970
Defunct	12
(South Korea) Chaegowi	1967, 1971, 1972
(South Korea) Kiwang	1977
(South Korea) Myungin	1969
(South Korea) Paewang	1964, 1967–1971, 1976

Title	Years Lost
Current	5
(South Korea) Wangwi	1973, 1975, 1977
(South Korea) Guksu	1961, 1971
Defunct	11
(South Korea) Chaegowi	1961, 1964, 1966, 1968, 1973, 1974
(South Korea) Kiwang	1978
(South Korea) Myungin	1968, 1970
(South Korea) Paewang	1977, 1978
