= Political divisions of Korea =

Political divisions of Korea may refer to:

- Administrative divisions of North Korea
- Administrative divisions of South Korea
- Provinces of Korea - historical information
- Special cities of North Korea
- Special cities of South Korea
