= 慶尚南道 =

慶尚南道 may refer to:

- Keishōnan-dō
- South Gyeongsang Province
