= Guannan =

Guannan may refer to:

- Guannan County, in Jiangsu, China
- Kwannam, traditional Korean term used to refer to the southern region of Hamgyong province
