= Byun Shi-ji =

South Korean painter (1926–2013)

- Born: 1926; Seogwipo, Zenranan Province, Korea, Empire of Japan
- Died: 2013 (aged 86–87)
- Education: Osaka Fine Arts School
- Occupation: Painter

Korean name
- Hangul: 변시지
- Hanja: 邊時志
- RR: Byeon Siji
- MR: Pyŏn Siji

Byun Shi-ji (Korean: 변시지; 1926–2013) was a South Korean painter associated with Jeju Island. Born in Seogwipo, he moved with his family to Osaka in 1931, studied Western painting at Osaka Fine Arts School, and later trained under the Japanese painter Terauchi Manjirō in Tokyo. He returned to South Korea in 1957 and resettled in Jeju in 1975, where he developed the mature style for which he is best known.

== Biography ==
Byun was born in Seogwipo, on Jeju Island, Zenranan Province, Korea, Empire of Japan in 1926. In 1931 he moved with his family to Osaka, Japan. He graduated from Osaka Fine Arts School in 1945 and then studied under Terauchi Manjirō in Tokyo. In 1948 he received the Grand Prize at the 34th Kōfūkai Exhibition, where he achieved early recognition.

Byun returned to Korea in 1957. He lived first in Seoul for nearly two decades, where he taught at Seoul National University, before returning to his hometown of Jeju in 1975. Sources on his career commonly divide it into three phases: a Japan period (1931–1957), a Seoul period (1957–1975), and a Jeju period (1975–2013).

Byun's later paintings are known for ochre-toned grounds and spare black lines. His recurring motifs include wind, sea, horses, crows, thatched houses, and solitary figures, and his mature work is closely associated with Jeju's landscape and climate. According to Visit Jeju, his paintings can also be read not only as landscapes but as portraits of modern human anxiety and unsettled existence.

== Legacy ==
Two of Byun's paintings were selected for long-term display in the Korea Gallery of the Smithsonian Institution. Gidang Art Museum in Seogwipo maintains a permanent exhibition of his work. In 2023, exhibitions of Byun's work were accompanied by the publication and display of a seven-volume catalogue of works documenting more than 5,000 paintings and related materials collected over several decades.
