= Guksu (disambiguation) =

Guksu was a Go competition in South Korea.

Guksu may also refer to:

- Guksu (dish), the generic term for Korean noodles
- Kuksu (religion), or Guksu, a native California spirit and religion
