= 55th Guksu =

Go tournament

The 55th Guksu has been won by Cho Hanseung, who defeated the defending champion Choi Cheol-han 3:2.

== Title Match ==
Status	Name	1st round	2nd round	3rd round	4th round	5th round	Final Result
		17 October	25 October	8 November	14 November	16 November	
Title Holder	Choi Cheol-han	-	B+R	-	B+R	-	2
Challenger	Cho Hanseung	B+R	-	B+R	-	B+1.5	3

== Challenger Tournament ==
As of 10 January 2012.

Round of 16
20 June
Lee Sedol	W+R
Kim Jiseok	B
21 June
Yun Junsang	W
Cho Hanseung	B+R
23 June
Kang Dongyun	W+R
Baek Hongsuk	B
20 June
Lee Jihyun	B
Kang Yootaek	W+R
21 June
Park Junghwan	W+R
Kim Dongho	B
30 June
Lee Changho	B+R
Hong Sungji	W
7 May
Heo Yeongho	W+R
Hong Kipyo	B
23 June
Ko Geuntae	B
Won Sungjin	W+R

Quarter-finals
27 July
Lee Sedol	W
Cho Hanseung	B+R
26 July
Kang Dongyun	W+R
Kang Yootaek	B
26 July
Park Junghwan	W+R
Lee Changho	B
27 July
Heo Yeongho	W
Won Sungjin	B+R

Semi-finals
9 August
Cho Hanseung	B+R
Kang Dongyun	W
19 August
Park Junghwan	B
Won Sungjin	W+0.5

Final
6,19 September
Cho Hanseung	2
Won Sungjin	0
