= Kang Cheol-min =

South Korean Go player

Personal information
- Native name: 강철민 (Korean); 姜哲民 (Korean)
- Born: July 26, 1939 Korea, Japanese Empire
- Died: December 2, 2002 South Korea

Sport
- Turned pro: 1958
- Rank: 8 dan

Kang Cheol-min (July 26, 1939 – December 2, 2002) was a professional Go player.

== Biography ==
Kang became a professional in 1958. It took him 40 years to reach the level of 8 dan. He was considered the founder of the Korean Uju-ryu style of go. He died in 2002.

== Titles and runners-up ==
Title	Years Held
Defunct	2
(South Korea) Chaegowi	1968, 1970

Title	Years Lost
Current	1
(South Korea) Guksu	1974
Defunct	5
(South Korea) Chaegowi	1969, 1971, 1972
(South Korea) Paewang	1967, 1968
