= 全羅南道 =

全羅南道 may refer to:

- South Jeolla Province
- Zenranan-dō
