= SK Gas Cup =

The SK Gas Cup is a Go competition.

== Outline ==
The SK Gas Cup is sponsored by SK Gas. The participants must be under the age of 25 and under the rank of 5 dan. The komi is 6.5 points. Thinking time is 3 hours. The winner's prize is 10,000,000 Won ($8,500).

== Past winners ==
Player	Years Held
An Choyoung	1997
Lee Seong-Jae	1998
Mok Jin-seok	1999
Lee Sang-Hoon	2000
Kang Jisung	2001
Lee Sedol	2002
Cho Hanseung	2003
Park Jungsang	2004
Kang Dongyun	2005
Paek Hongsuk	2006

Previous winners (and defeated finalists):

12th 2008 Kim Kiyoung      (d. Park Jung Hwan    2–1)
11th 2007 Yun Junsang      (d. Heo Yeongho       2–1)
10th 2006 Baek Hongsuk     (d. Lee Yeongkyu      2–0)
9th 2005 Kang Dongyun      (d. Ko Geuntae        2–0)
8th 2004 Park Jungsang       (d. An Younggil       2–1)
7th 2003 Cho Hanseung      (d. Paek Tae-hyeon    2–0)
6th 2002 Yi Se-tol         (d. Paek Tae-hyeon    2–0)
5th 2001 Kang Chi-seong    (d. Paek Tae-hyeon    2–0)
4th 2000 Yi Sang-hun       (d. Yi Se-tol         2–1)
3rd 1999 Mok Chin-seok     (d. Weon Seong-chin   2–0)
2nd 1998 Yi Seong-chae     (d. Mok Chin-seok     1–0)
1st 1997 An Cho-yeong      (d. Kim Yeong-sam     1–0)

"It is very important for junior players like me to study harder and harder. I am replaying and analyzing pro games daily. I think, it’s more important than playing Go a lot." – said Park Jungsang
