= CSK Cup =

Go competition played in Okinawa, Japan

The CSK Cup is a Go competition.

== Outline ==
The CSK Cup is sponsored by CSK. The venue for the tournament is played in Okinawa, Japan every year. The tournament is in team format, where four countries pick five players to compete against five players from the other countries. The countries that compete are:

- Japan
- South Korea
- China
- Taiwan

The winners prize is 20 million Yen ($171,000) and is split up between team members so everyone receives 4 million Yen ($43,000). Second place prize is 10 million Yen ($86,000), third place receives 6 million Yen ($51,000) and fourth place receives 4 million Yen ($34,000).

== Past winners and runner up's ==
Team	Years won
(South Korea) Korean Team	2002, 2005
(Japan) Japanese Team	2003
(China) Chinese Team	2004, 2006

Team	Years runner up
(Taiwan) Taiwanese Team	2002
(South Korea) Korean Team	2003, 2004, 2006
(Japan) Japanese Team	2005
