= China–Korea Tengen =

International Go competition

The China–Korea Tengen was a Go competition. It was played between China's Tianyuan titleholder and Korea's Chunwon titleholder each year in a best-of-three match. The competition was held 19 times, from 1997 to 2015. China won 10 times and Korea won 9 times. The Chunwon was discontinued after 2015, which ended the China–Korea Tengen as well.

== Past winners and runners-up ==
Edition	Year	Winner	Score	Runner-up
1st	1997	(South Korea) Lee Chang-ho	2–1	(China) Chang Hao
2nd	1998	(South Korea) Lee Chang-ho	2–0	(China) Chang Hao
3rd	1999	(South Korea) Lee Chang-ho	2–0	(China) Chang Hao
4th	2000	(South Korea) Lee Chang-ho	2–0	(China) Chang Hao
5th	2001	(China) Chang Hao	2–0	(South Korea) Lee Sedol
6th	2002	(South Korea) Park Yeong-hun	2–1	(China) Huang Yizhong
7th	2003	(China) Gu Li	2–0	(South Korea) Song Tae-kon
8th	2004	(China) Gu Li	2–1	(South Korea) Choi Cheol-han
9th	2005	(China) Gu Li	2–1	(South Korea) Choi Cheol-han
10th	2006	(South Korea) Ko Geuntae	2–1	(China) Gu Li
11th	2007	(China) Gu Li	2–0	(South Korea) Cho Han-seung
12th	2008	(South Korea) Won Seong-jin	2–0	(China) Gu Li
13th	2009	(China) Chen Yaoye	2–1	(South Korea) Kang Dong-yun
14th	2010	(South Korea) Park Junghwan	2–1	(China) Chen Yaoye
15th	2011	(China) Chen Yaoye	2–0	(South Korea) Choi Cheol-han
16th	2012	(China) Chen Yaoye	2–0	(South Korea) Choi Cheol-han
17th	2013	(China) Chen Yaoye	2–1	(South Korea) Park Yeong-hun
18th	2014	(South Korea) Park Junghwan	2–0	(China) Chen Yaoye
19th	2015	(China) Chen Yaoye	2–0	(South Korea) Na Hyun

== See also ==
- China–Japan Tengen
- List of professional Go tournaments
