= Chen Yaoye =

Chinese professional Go player (born 1989)

Chen Yaoye 陈耀烨
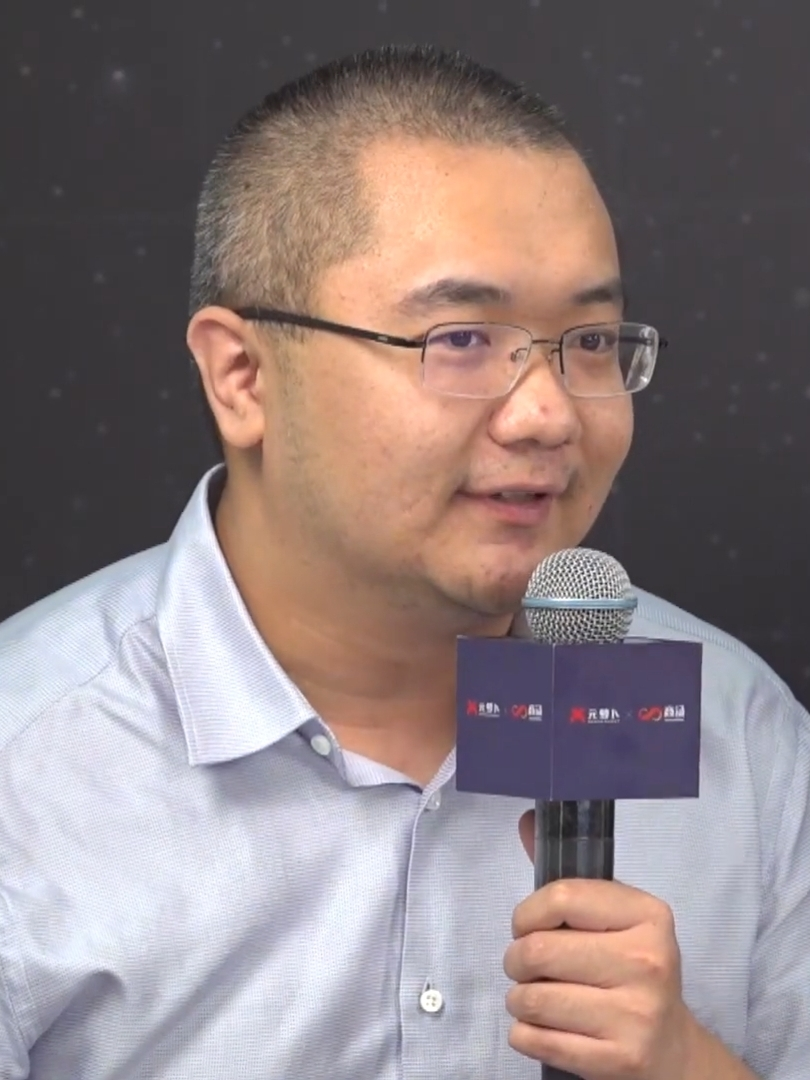
- Chen in 2023

Personal information
- Born: December 16, 1989 (age 36) Beijing, China

Sport
- Turned pro: 2000
- Rank: 9 dan
- Affiliation: Chinese Weiqi Association

Chen Yaoye
- Traditional Chinese: 陳耀燁
- Simplified Chinese: 陈耀烨
Transcriptions
Standard Mandarin
- Hanyu Pinyin: Chén Yàoyè

Chen Yaoye (Traditional: 陳耀燁; Simplified: 陈耀烨; Pinyin: Chén Yàoyè; born on December 16, 1989) is a Chinese professional Go player.

== Biography ==
Chen Yaoye was born in Beijing, China. He is a young Go player who, at the age of 16, had already beaten Lee Chang-ho, arguably the best Go player in the world. He has won a title, the 2005 National Go Individual with a record of 7 wins and 2 losses. At the time he was 15 years and 9 months of age, the youngest Chinese player to win the tournament. After beating Lee in the 10th LG Cup, he scored two more wins in that tournament to progress to the final. In March 2006, he faced off against Gu Li in the final of the 10th LG Cup. Chen had lost the first two matches, but won the next two games to tie it at 2–2. It came to the final fifth game, and Chen lost. He was promoted to 9 dan in 2007 after he was runner-up to Lee Sedol in the Asian TV Cup.

In June 2013, he defeated Lee Sedol in the 9th Chunlan Cup final by 2–1, winning his first international individual title.

Chen's style is characterised by his strong preference for early territory, much like Cho Chikun.

== Promotion record ==
Rank	Year	Notes
1 dan	2000	Promoted to professional dan rank for performance in the Chinese professional qualification tournament.
2 dan	2001	Promoted for performance in the Chinese professional promotion tournament.
3 dan	2002	Promoted for performance in the Chinese professional promotion tournament.
4 dan	2004	Promoted for performance in the Chinese professional promotion tournament.
5 dan	2005	Promoted for performance in the Chinese professional promotion tournament.
6 dan	2007	Skipped due to the Chinese Weiqi Association promotion rules.
7 dan	2007	Skipped due to the Chinese Weiqi Association promotion rules.
8 dan	2007	Skipped due to the Chinese Weiqi Association promotion rules.
9 dan	2007	Runner-up in the 10th LG Cup and the 19th Asian TV Cup.

== Titles & runners-up ==
As of 1 November 2018

Tied for #5 in total number of titles in China.

Domestic
Title	Wins	Runners-up
National Go Individual	1 (2005)	
CCTV Cup	1 (2010)	1 (2007)
Ahan Tongshan Cup		2 (2003, 2011, 2015–16)
Changqi Cup	1 (2012)	
Mingren	2 (2013-2014)	1 (2015)
Longxing		1 (2016)
Jinli Smartphone Cup		1 (2017)
Tianyuan	8 (2009-2016)	1 (2017)
Total	13	9
Continental
Title	Wins	Runners-up
China-Korea Tengen	4 (2009, 2011–2013)	1 (2010)
Kongtong Mountain Invitational Tournament	1 (2018)	
Total	5	1
International
Title	Wins	Runners-up
LG Cup		1 (2006)
Asian TV Cup		1 (2007)
Chunlan Cup	1 (2013)	
Bailing Cup	1 (2016)	1 (2012)
Tianfu Cup	1 (2018)	
Total	3	3
Career total
Total	21	13

== Head-to-head record vs selected players ==
As of 1 November 2018

Players who have won international Go titles in bold.

- (South Korea) **Park Junghwan** 21:16
- (China) **Gu Li** 20:11
- (South Korea) **Choi Cheolhan** 13:9
- (China) Xie He 13:9
- (China) **Zhou Ruiyang** 5:16
- (China) **Tuo Jiaxi** 10:10
- (China) **Ke Jie** 8:12
- (China) **Piao Wenyao** 6:13
- (China) **Tan Xiao** 10:9
- (China) Lian Xiao 8:10
- (China) **Jiang Weijie** 10:7
- (South Korea) **Lee Sedol** 8:8
- (China) Qiu Jun 8:8
- (China) Hu Yaoyu 7:9
- (China) Gu Lingyi 13:2
- (South Korea) **Kang Dongyun** 10:5
- (China) **Shi Yue** 5:10
- (China) **Wang Xi** 9:5
- (China) Li Zhe 6:8
- (South Korea) **Kim Ji-seok** 6:6
- (China) **Kong Jie** 6:6
- (China) **Mi Yuting** 4:8
- (China) **Tang Weixing** 11:1
- (China) **Fan Tingyu** 9:2
