= Choi Myung-hoon =

South Korean Go player (born 1975)

Personal information
- Native name: 최명훈 (Korean); 崔明勳 (Korean); Choe Myeonghun (Revised Romanization); Ch'oe Myŏnghun (McCune–Reischauer)
- Born: May 12, 1975 (age 51) South Korea

Sport
- Teacher: Kim Chwa-ki
- Rank: 9 dan
- Affiliation: Hanguk Kiwon

Choi Myung-hoon (born May 12, 1975) is a professional Go player.

== Biography ==
Choi was promoted to 9 dan in 2004. In 2000, he won his first and only title, the LG Refined Oil Cup.

== Titles & runners-up ==
Title	Years Held
Defunct	1
(South Korea) LG Refined Oil Cup	2000

Title	Years Lost
Current	3
(South Korea) Kisung	1997
(South Korea) Chunwon	1997, 1998
Defunct	6
(South Korea) LG Refined Oil Cup	1997, 1998, 2001, 2002
(South Korea) Myungin	1996, 1999
International	1
(Japan) (South Korea) (China) (Taiwan) (Europe) (United States) Fujitsu Cup	2001
