= Riyuexing Cup =

2005 Go competition

The Riyuexing Cup (Chinese: 日月星杯; pinyin: Rìyuèxīng Bēi) was a Go competition held in 2005.

== Outline ==
The Riyuexing Cup was a team tournament, in which two countries compete. The countries were China and South Korea. Each country selected five players. Each Go player then played against the every other player of the opposing team. The country with the most wins would be crowned the champion.

There would be five rounds of matches. China led 11–9 in the first four rounds. The fifth and final round was postponed and never held.

== Results ==
- First round (Beijing, 4 February 2005)

China	3:2	South Korea
Hu Yaoyu	1:0	Park Yeong-hun
Luo Xihe	0:1	Kim Seong-ryong
Wang Xi	1:0	Song Tae-kon
Zhou Heyang	1:0	Yoo Chang-hyuk
Wang Lei	0:1	Choi Cheol-han

- Second round (Beijing, 5 February 2005)

China	2:3	South Korea
Hu Yaoyu	1:0	Kim Seong-ryong
Wang Lei	0:1	Yoo Chang-hyuk
Wang Xi	0:1	Park Yeong-hun
Zhou Heyang	1:0	Song Tae-kon
Luo Xihe	0:1	Choi Cheol-han

- Third round (Seoul, 12 May 2005)

China	4:1	South Korea
Luo Xihe	1:0	Yoo Chang-hyuk
Wang Lei	1:0	Song Tae-kon
Wang Xi	1:0	Kim Seong-ryong
Zhou Heyang	1:0	Park Yeong-hun
Hu Yaoyu	0:1	Choi Cheol-han

- Fourth round (Seoul, 13 May 2005)

China	2:3	South Korea
Luo Xihe	1:0	Song Tae-kon
Wang Lei	1:0	Park Yeong-hun
Zhou Heyang	0:1	Kim Seong-ryong
Hu Yaoyu	0:1	Yoo Chang-hyuk
Wang Xi	0:1	Choi Cheol-han
