= Yun Ki-hyeon =

South Korean Go player (1942–2026)

Personal information
- Native name: 윤기현 (Korean); 尹奇鉉 (Korean)
- Full name: Yun Ki-hyeon
- Born: September 19, 1942
- Died: April 4, 2026 (aged 83)

Sport
- Turned pro: 1959
- Teacher: Kano Yoshinori, Minoru Kitani
- Rank: 9 dan
- Affiliation: Hanguk Kiwon

Yun Ki-hyeon (Korean: 윤기현; September 19, 1942 – April 4, 2026) was a South Korean Go player. He won the Guksu title twice, in 1971–1972. He resigned as a professional Go player in 2009 due to a controversy and lawsuit over valuable Go boards which Yun sold. Yun died on April 4, 2026, at the age of 83.
