= China-Japan Supermatches =

The China-Japan Supermatches (日中スーパー囲碁) was a Go competition.

== Outline ==
The China-Japan Supermatches were a series of team competition between China and Japan in the board game of Go. The tournament was hosted by NEC; it was held 16 times from 1984 to 2001. The matches were in the knock-out format with 6 to 9 players on each side for the first 11 times (1984-1996). In the later games, each side had 3 players for one-on-one matches.

Before the late 1980s top Japanese players were generally considered to be at a higher level than the rest of the world, but in the end, China won 9 times in total. The result has had a great impact on the development of the game in China afterward.

== Winners ==
Edition	Years Held	Winner	Score
1st	1984–1985	China	8–7
2nd	1986	China	9–8
3rd	1987	China	9–8
4th	1988	Japan	7–2
5th	1989–1990	China	8–3
6th	1991–1992	Japan	8–7
7th	1992–1993	Japan	7–5
8th	1993–1994	Japan	7–3
9th	1994	China	6–3
10th	1995–1996	China	7–5
11th	1996	China	7–2
12th	1997	China	2–1
13th	1998	Japan	2–1
14th	1999	Japan	2–1
15th	2000	China	2–1
16th	2001	Japan	2–1
