= Hamgyong Province =

Historical province of Korea

Korean transcription(s)
  - Chosŏn'gŭl: 함경도
  - Hanja: 咸鏡道
  - Revised Romanization: Hamgyeong-do
  - McCune–Reischauer: Hamgyŏng-do
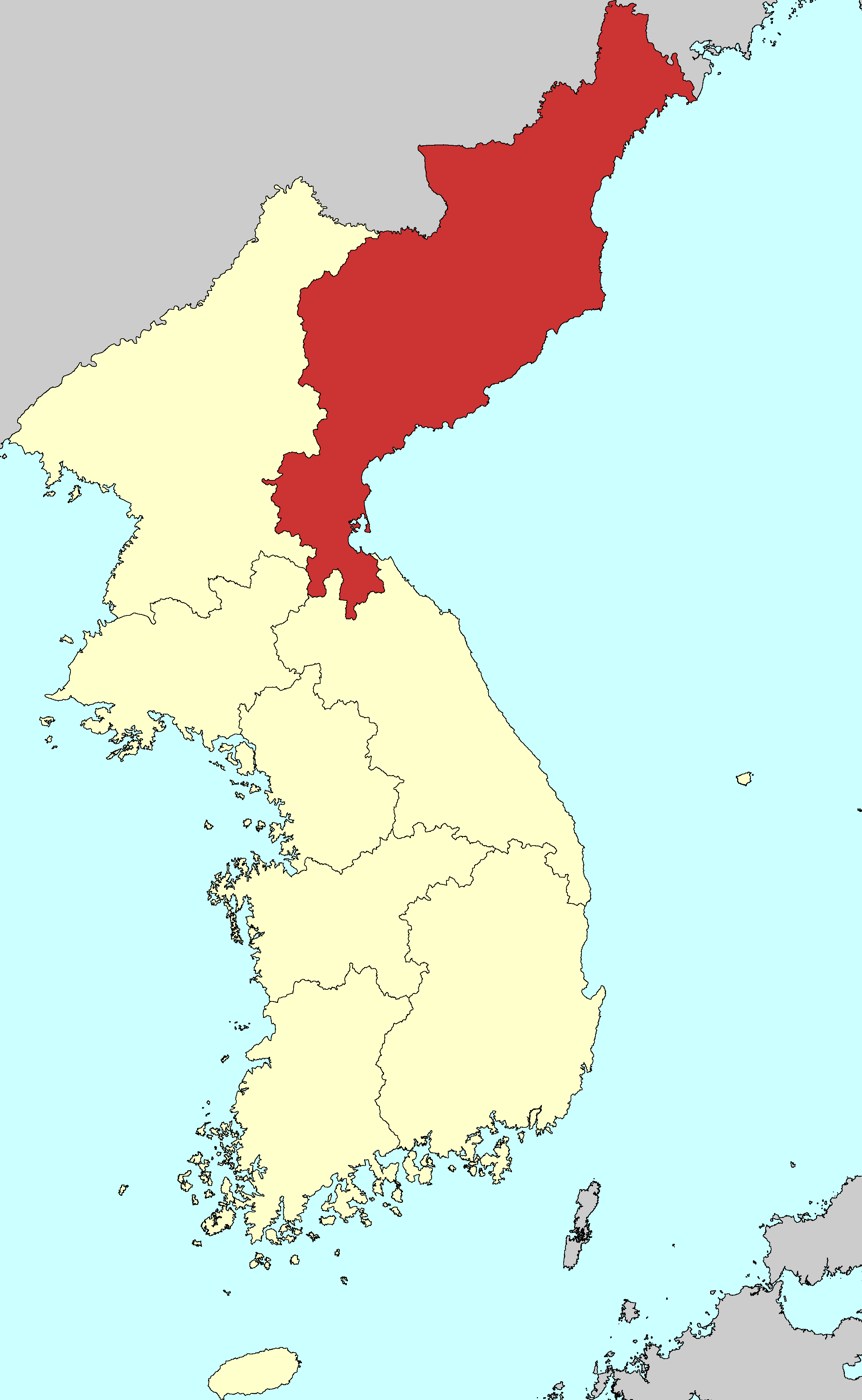
- Country: Joseon
- Region: Kwanbuk (north), Kwannam (south)
- Capital: Hamhung

Government
  - Type: Province
- Dialect: Hamgyŏng

Hamgyong Province (Korean: 함경도; Hanja: 咸鏡道; Korean pronunciation: [ha̠m.ɡjʌ̹ŋ.do̞]) was one of the Eight Provinces of Korea during the Joseon Dynasty. Hamgyong was located in the northeast of Korea. The provincial capital was Hamhung.

== Names ==
The province was first established as Yŏnggil (영길; 永吉) in 1413. It was renamed Hamgil (함길; 咸吉) three years later. In 1470, it was renamed Yŏngan (영안; 永安). In 1509, it was renamed Hamgyŏng after its two principal cities, Hamhung and Kyongsong.

In the 18th century, this was transcribed via Chinese as Kyen-king and glossed as meaning "the Happy". In the 19th century, it was transcribed as Ham-kieng.

Within Korea, the province was also referred to as "Dongbuk" ("Northeast"). The southern half of the province was also referred as "Kwannam", and the northern half of the province was also referred as "Kwanbuk".

== History ==
Korea's northeastern frontier was first organized into the province of Yonggil in 1413.

In 1895, the province was replaced by the districts (부; 府; pu) of Kyongsong in the northeast, Kapsan in the northwest, and Hamhŭng in the south.

In 1896, Kyŏngsŏng District was reorganized into North Hamgyŏng Province, and Kapsan and Hamhŭng Districts were reorganized into South Hamgyŏng Province. These divisions continue in present-day North Korea.

== Geography ==
Hamgyŏng was bounded on the west by P'yŏngan, on the south by Hwanghae and Kangwŏn, on the east by the Sea of Japan, and on the north by Qing China and the Russian Empire.

== See also ==
- Provinces of Korea
- Administrative circuit
