= North American Masters Tournament (defunct) =

Defunct Go competition

The North American Masters Tournament is a Go competition.

== Outline ==
The North American Masters Tournament is a tournament held in North America where players in America competed. It was the first professional Go tournament to be held in North America and is unusual in that it is mostly played over the internet.

== Past winners ==
Player	Years Held
Jiang Zhujiu	1995 - 2002
Jie Li	2005 - 2006
