= Ko Geuntae =

South Korean professional Go player (born 1987)

Personal information
- Native name: 고근태 (Korean); 高根台 (Korean); Go Geuntae (Revised Romanization); Ko Kŭnt'ae (McCune–Reischauer)
- Full name: Ko Geuntae
- Born: March 30, 1987 (age 39) South Korea

Sport
- Rank: 9 dan
- Affiliation: Hanguk Kiwon

Ko Geuntae (born March 30, 1987) is a South Korean professional Go player.

== Biography ==
Ko Geuntae won the Chunwon title in 2005. Due to his Chunwon win, he was given an automatic berth into the 19th Fujitsu Cup. He beat top ranked Chinese professional and holder of the LG Cup, Gu Li, in the China-Korea Tengen. Ko won the series two games to one. He reached 9 dan in 2015.

== Titles ==
Title	Years Held
Current	1
(South Korea) Chunwon	2005
Continental	1
(South Korea) China-Korea Tengen	2006
