= Keishōhoku Province =

1910–1945 province of Korea under Japan

Keishōhoku-dō 慶尚北道
- Former province of Korea, Empire of Japan
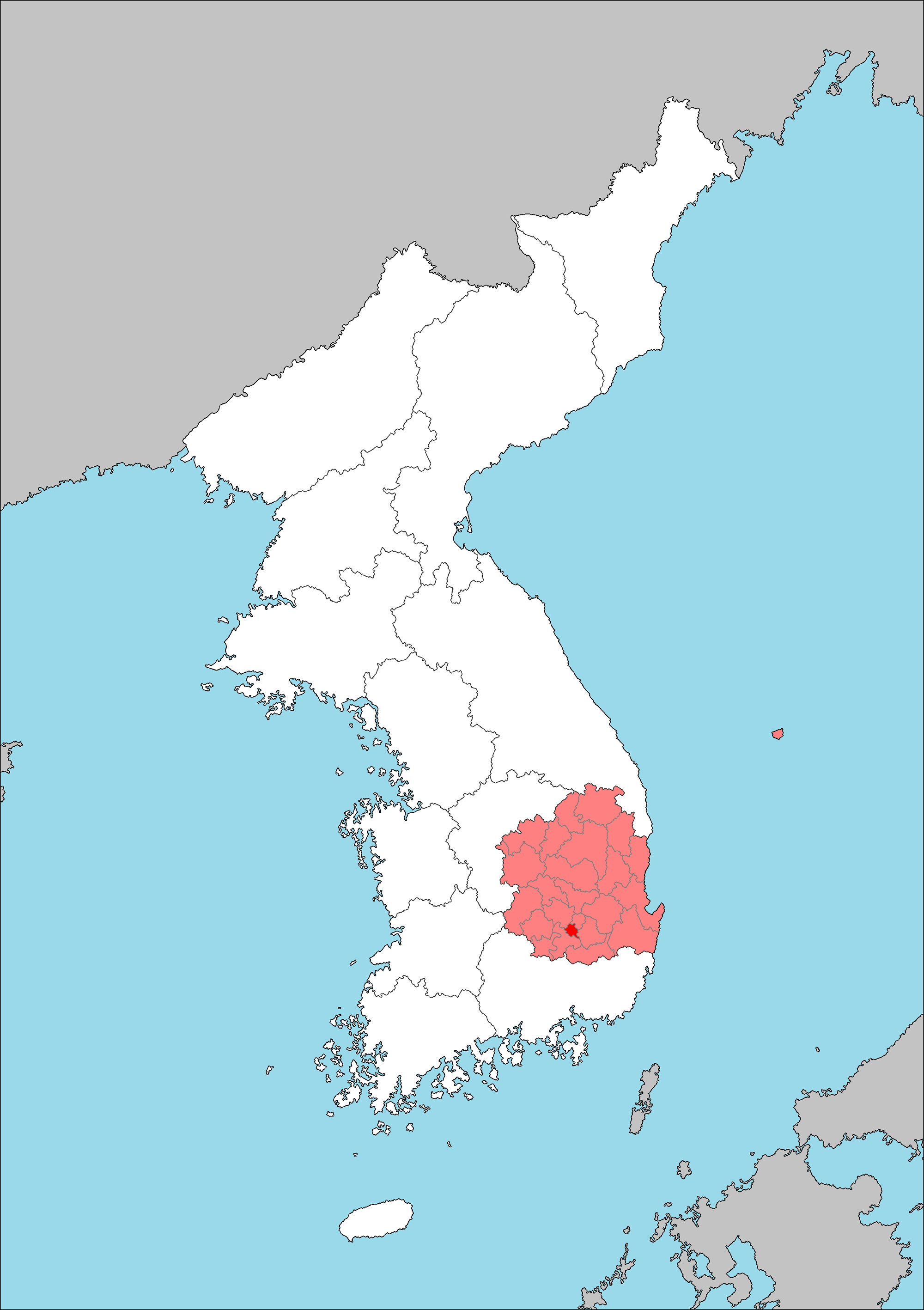
- Capital: Taikyū
- History
  - Established: 29 August 1910
  - Disestablished: 15 August 1945
- Today part of: South Korea; Japan and North Korea (due to claim over Liancourt Rocks)

Keishōhoku-dō (慶尚北道; Korean: 경상북도), alternatively Keishōhoku Province, Keisho Hoku, or North Keishō Province, was a province of Korea under Japanese rule. Its capital was at Taikyū (Daegu). The province consisted of what is now the South Korean province of North Gyeongsang and Daegu Metropolitan City.

== Population ==
Year	Population
1925	2,293,285
1930	2,373,856
1940	2,428,177
1944	2,561,251

Number of people by nationality according to the 1936 census:

- Overall population: 2,454,275 people
  - Japanese: 49,887 people
  - Koreans: 2,402,970 people
  - Other: 1,418 people

== Administrative divisions ==
The following list is based on the administrative divisions of 1945:

=== Cities ===
Emblem of Taikyū

- Taikyū (大邱) - (capital): Daegu (대구). present Daegu Metropolitan City.

=== Counties ===
- Tatsujō (달성)
- Gun'i (군위)
- Gijō (의성)
- Antō (안동)
- Seishō (청송)
- Eiyō (영양)
- Eitoku (영덕)
- Geijitsu (영일. 현 포항)
- Keishū (경주)
- Eisen (영천)
- Keizan (경산)
- Seidō (청도)
- Kōrei (고령)
- Seishū (성주)
- Shikkoku (칠곡)
- Kinsen (김천)
- Zenzan (선산. 현 구미)
- Shōshū (상주)
- Bunkei (문경)
- Reisen (예천)
- Eishū (영주)
- Hōka (봉화)

=== Islands ===
- Utsuryō Island (울릉)

== Provincial governors ==
The following people were provincial ministers before August 1919. This was then changed to the title of governor.

Nationality	Name	Name in kanji/hanja	Start of tenure	End of tenure	Notes
Korean	Lee Jin-ho	李軫鎬	October 1, 1910	March 28, 1916	Provincial minister
Japanese	Suzuki Takashi	鈴木 隆	March 28, 1916	September 26, 1919	Provincial minister before August 1919
Japanese	Fujikawa Rizaburō	藤川 利三郎	September 26, 1919	February 24, 1923	
Japanese	Sawada Toyotake	沢田 豊丈	February 24, 1923	May 12, 1926	
Japanese	Sudō Moto	須藤 基	May 12, 1926	January 21, 1929	
Japanese	Imamura Masami	今村 正美	January 21, 1929	December 11, 1929	
Japanese	Hayashi Shigeki	林 茂樹	December 11, 1929	September 23, 1931	
Korean	Kim Seo-kyu	金瑞圭	September 23, 1931	April 1, 1935	
Japanese	Okazaki Tetsurō	岡崎 哲郎	April 1, 1935	May 21, 1936	
Japanese	Date Yotsuo	伊達 四雄	May 21, 1936	September 5, 1936	
Japanese	Kōtaki Motoi	上滝 基	September 5, 1936	January 24, 1941	
Japanese	Takahashi Satoshi	高橋 敏	January 24, 1941	November 19, 1941	
Japanese	Takao Jinzō	高尾 甚造	November 19, 1941	September 30, 1943	
Korean	Takenaga Kazuki	武永 憲樹	September 30, 1943	August 17, 1944	Had been change name from Eom Chang-seob (嚴昌燮)
Korean	Lee Chang-geun	李昌根	August 17, 1944	June 16, 1945	
Korean	Kim Dae-woo	金大羽	June 16, 1945	August 15, 1945	Korean independence and Japanese surrender

== See also ==
- Provinces of Korea
- Governor-General of Chōsen
- Administrative divisions of Korea
