= Keishōnan Province =

1910–1945 province of Korea under Japan

Keishōnan-dō 慶尚南道
- Former province of Korea under Japanese rule
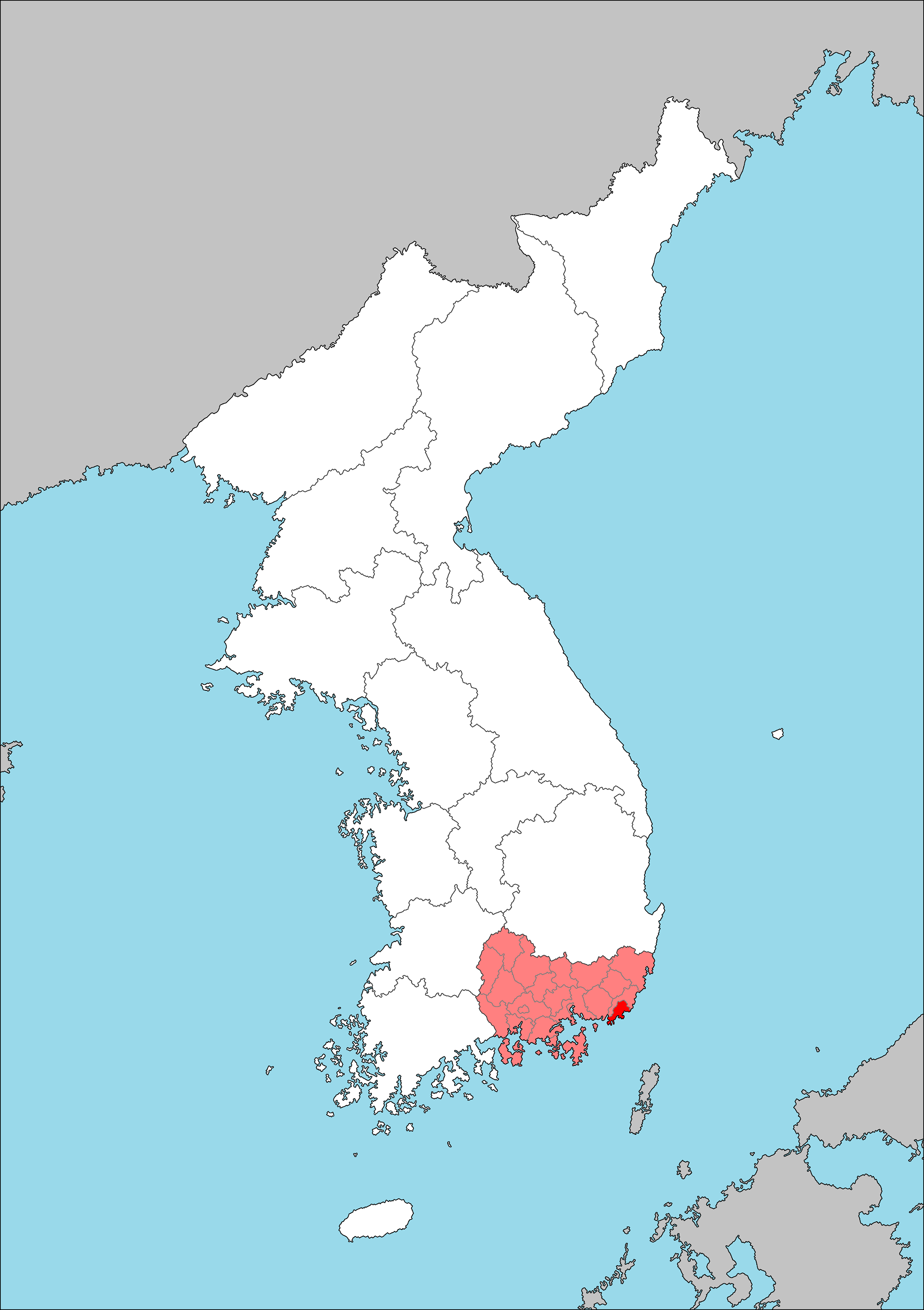
- Capital: Fuzan
- History
  - Established: 29 August 1910
  - Disestablished: 15 August 1945
- Today part of: South Korea

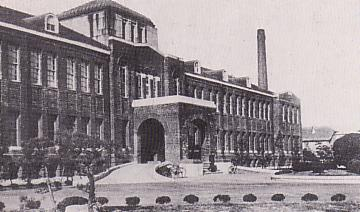
Keishō-nan Provincial Office

Keishōnan-dō (慶尚南道; Korean: 경상남도), alternatively Keishōnan Province or South Keishō Province, was a province of Korea under Japanese rule. Its capital was Fuzan (Busan). The province consisted of modern-day South Gyeongsang, South Korea.

== Population ==
Year	Population
1925	1,938,001
1930	2,045,113
1940	2,147,602
1944	2,318,146

Number of people by nationality according to the 1936 census:

- Overall population: 2,214,406 people
  - Japanese: 96,926 people
  - Koreans: 2,115,553 people
  - Other: 1,927 people

== Administrative divisions ==
The following list is based on the administrative divisions of 1945:

=== Cities ===
Emblem of Fuzan

Emblem of Bazan

- Fuzan (부산) (capital)
- Bazan (마산)
- Shinshū (진주)

=== Counties ===
- Shin'yō (진주)
- Ginei (의령)
- Kan'an (함안)
- Shōnei (창녕)
- Mitsuyō (밀양)
- Ryōzan (양산)
- Urusan (울산)
- Tōrai (동래)
- Kinkai (김해)
- Shōgen (창원)
- Tōei (통영)
- Kojō (고성)
- Shisen (사천)
- Nankai (남해)
- Katō (하동)
- Sansei (산청)
- Kan'yō (함양)
- Kyōsen (합천)

== Provincial governors ==
The following people were provincial ministers before August 1919. This was then changed to the title of governor.

Name	Name in kanji/hanja	Start of tenure	End of tenure	Notes
Kagawa Teru	香川 輝	October 1, 1910	February 14, 1913	Provincial minister
Sasaki Tōtarō	佐々木 藤太郎	February 14, 1913	December 26, 1921	Provincial minister before August 1919
Sawada Toyotake	沢田 豊丈	December 26, 1921	February 24, 1923	
Wada Jun	和田 純	February 24, 1923	January 31, 1928	
Mizuguchi Ryūzō	水口 隆三	January 31, 1928	January 21, 1929	
Sudō Moto	須藤 素	January 21, 1929	November 28, 1929	
Tani Takima	谷 多喜磨	November 28, 1929	December 24, 1930	
Watanabe Toyohiko	渡辺 豊日子	December 24, 1930	August 4, 1933	
Sekimizu Takeshi	関水 武	August 4, 1933	April 1, 1935	
Hashi Morisada	土師 盛貞	April 1, 1935	May 26, 1937	
Abe Senichi	阿部 千一	May 26, 1937	September 10, 1938	
Yamazawa Wasaburō	山沢 和三郎	September 10, 1938	November 19, 1941	
Nishioka Yoshijirō	西岡 芳次郎	November 19, 1941	March 27, 1943	
Ōno Sueo	大野 季夫	March 27, 1943	March 28, 1945	
Nobuhara Satoru	信原 聖	March 28, 1945	August 15, 1945	Tenure ended with Korean independence

== See also ==
- Provinces of Korea
- Governor-General of Chōsen
- Administrative divisions of Korea
