= Provinces of Korea =

Historical administrative divisions

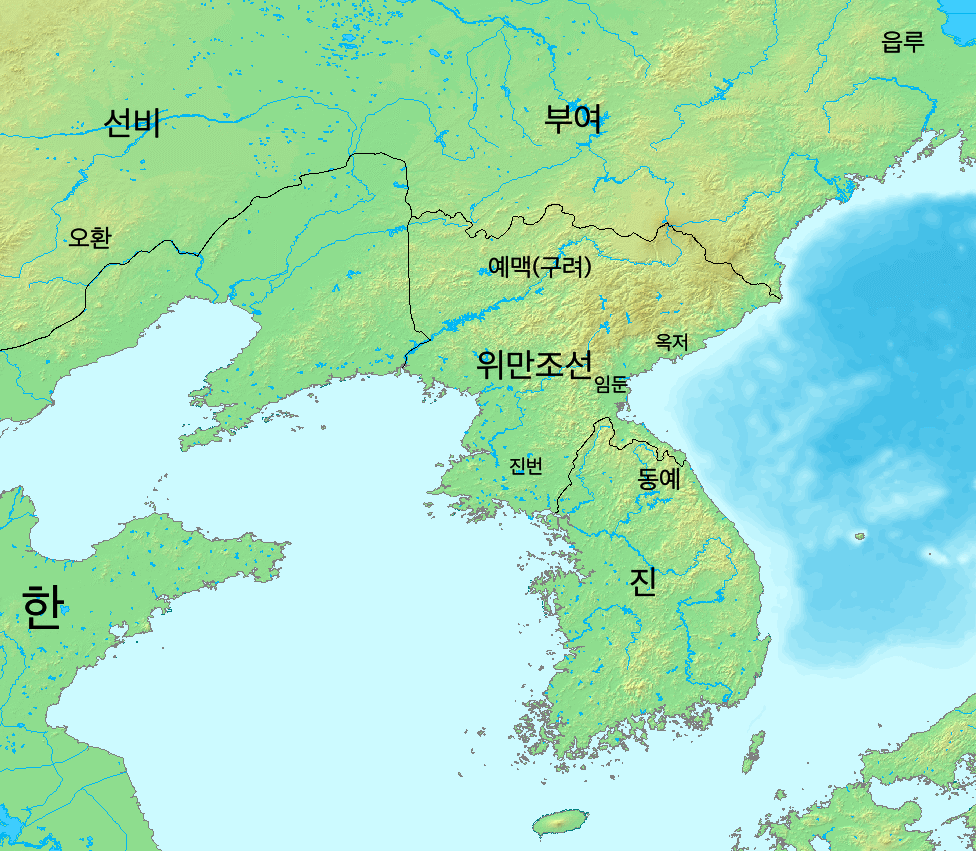
The ancient country, Old Chosŏn

Korea has had administrative districts that can be considered provinces since the 7th century. These divisions were initially called ju (Korean: 주; Hanja: 州) in Unified Silla and Later Baekje, and there were nine in total. After Goryeo conquered these states in the 10th century, twelve divisions called mok (목; 牧) were established, although they were reorganized into ten do (도; 道) in the 11th century.

After Joseon's conquest of Goryeo, it established the Eight Provinces in 1413. These provincial boundaries closely reflected major regional and dialect boundaries, and are still significant in contemporary Korea. In 1895, as part of the Gabo Reform, the country was redivided into 23 districts (Bu; 부; 府), which were replaced a year later by thirteen new provinces. The thirteen provinces of 1896 included three of the original eight provinces, with the five remaining original provinces divided into north and south halves (Bukdo (북도; 北道) and Namdo (남도; 南道) respectively). The thirteen provinces remained unchanged throughout the Japanese colonial period.

With the liberation of Korea in 1945, the Korean peninsula was divided into North Korea and South Korea, with the dividing line established along the 38th parallel. Three provinces—Hwanghae, Gyeonggi, and Gangwon (Kangwŏn)—were modified or split as a part of this. The special cities of Seoul (South Korea) and P'yŏngyang (North Korea) were formed in 1946. Between 1946 and 1954, five new provinces were created: Jeju in South Korea, and North and South Hwanghae, Chagang, and Ryanggang in North Korea. With the freezing of the Korean War in 1953, provincial boundaries were again modified between the two Koreas, and have since remained mostly unchanged; new cities and special administrative regions have since been created in their provinces.

== Provinces of Balhae ==
Although the southern part of the Korean peninsula was taken over by Silla, the northern part was not fully conquered by the Tang dynasty or Silla. Under the leadership of Tae Joyŏng, Parhae was founded. The country was divided into 5 capitals, 15 provinces; and 62 prefectures. Its territory covered former regions of Goguryeo while added territories of Outer Manchuria.

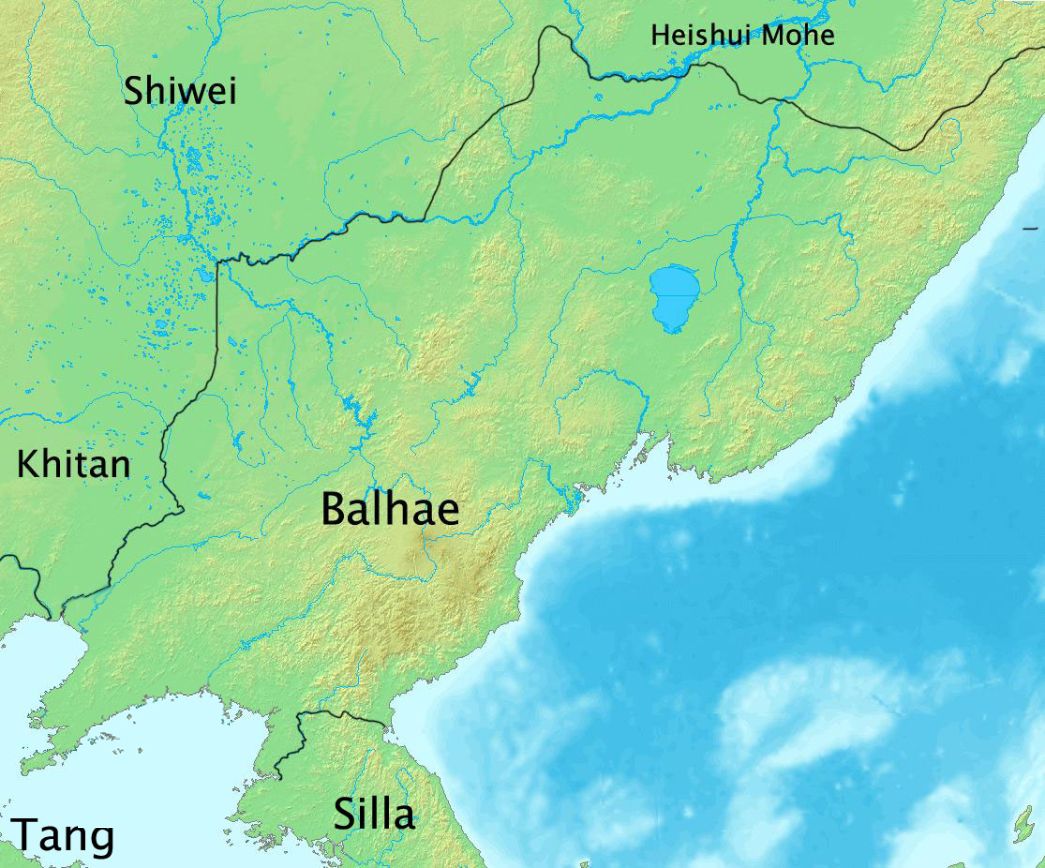

Hanja	Hangul	RR, Pinyin	Modern location
上京/龍州	상경/용주	Sanggyeong/Yongju Shangjing/Longzhou	Ning'an (寧安市) (Manchu: Ninguta 寧古塔)
中京/顯州	중경/현주	Junggyeong/Hyeonju Zhongjing/Xianzhou	Helong/Dunhua (和龍市/敦化市)
東京/慶州	동경/경주	Donggyeong/Gyeongju Dongjing/Qingzhou	Hunchun
南京/沃州	남경/옥주	Namgyeong/Okju Nanjing/Wozhou	Hamheung
西京/神州	서경/신주	Seogyeong/Sinju Xijing/Shenzhou	Linjiang
瑕州	하주	Haju Xiazhou	Jingyu (靖宇县)
扶州	부주	Buju Fuzhou	Kaiyuan
鄚州	막주	Makju Mozhou	Acheng (阿城)
定州	정주	Jeongju/Dingzhou	Partizansk
安州	안주	Anju Anzhou	Olga
華州	화주	Hwaju Huazhou	Ussuriysk/Shuaibin
伊州	이주	Iju Yizhou	Dangbi (密山市/当壁鎮)
德理鎮	덕리진	Deongnijin/Delizhen	Yilan (依蘭郷)
達州	달주	Dalju	Tongjiang (同江市)
寧州	영주	Yeongju Ningzhou	Dalnerechensk

== Provinces of Unified Silla ==
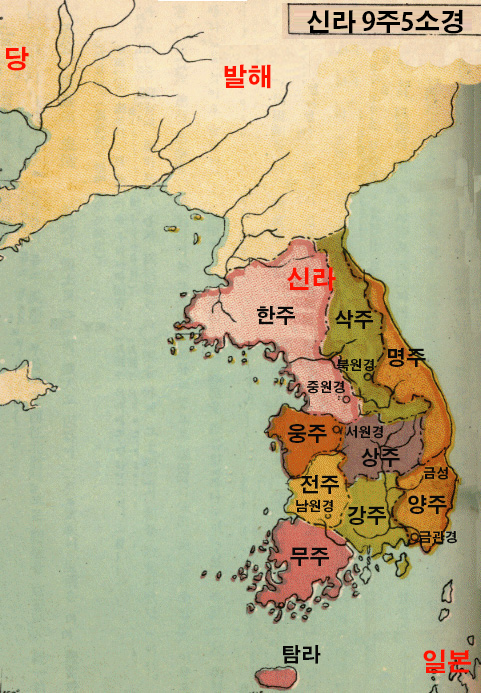
Map of 9 districts of Unified Silla with their 5 sub capitals.

The Korean peninsula was mostly unified for the first time by the state Silla in the 7th century. Silla's capital was Geumseong (now Gyeongju). It had five sub-capitals (소경; 小京; sogyeong) at Geumgwan-gyeong (금관경, now Gimhae), Namwon-gyeong (남원경, Namwon), Seowon-gyeong (서원경, Cheongju), Jungwon-gyeong (중원경, Chungju), and Bugwon-gyeong (북원경, Wonju).

The country was divided into nine provinces (주; ju): three in the pre-660 territory of Silla, and three each in the territories of the former kingdoms Baekje and Goguryeo.

Provinces of Silla
Province	Hangul	Hanja	Capital	Modern equivalent	Former kingdom
Yangju	양주	良州	Yangju	Eastern Gyeongsang	Silla
Gangju	강주	康州	Gangju	Western South Gyeongsang	Silla
Sangju	상주	尙州	Sangju	Western North Gyeongsang	Silla
Muju	무주	武州	Muju	South Jeolla	Baekje
Jeonju	전주	全州	Jeonju	North Jeolla	Baekje
Ungju	웅주	熊州	Gongju	South Chungcheong	Baekje
Hanju	한주	漢州	Hanju	North Chungcheong, Gyeonggi, Hwanghae	Goguryeo
Sakju	삭주	朔州	Sakju	Western Gangwon	Goguryeo
Myeongju	명주	溟州	Myeongju	Eastern Gangwon	Goguryeo

== Provinces of Goryeo ==
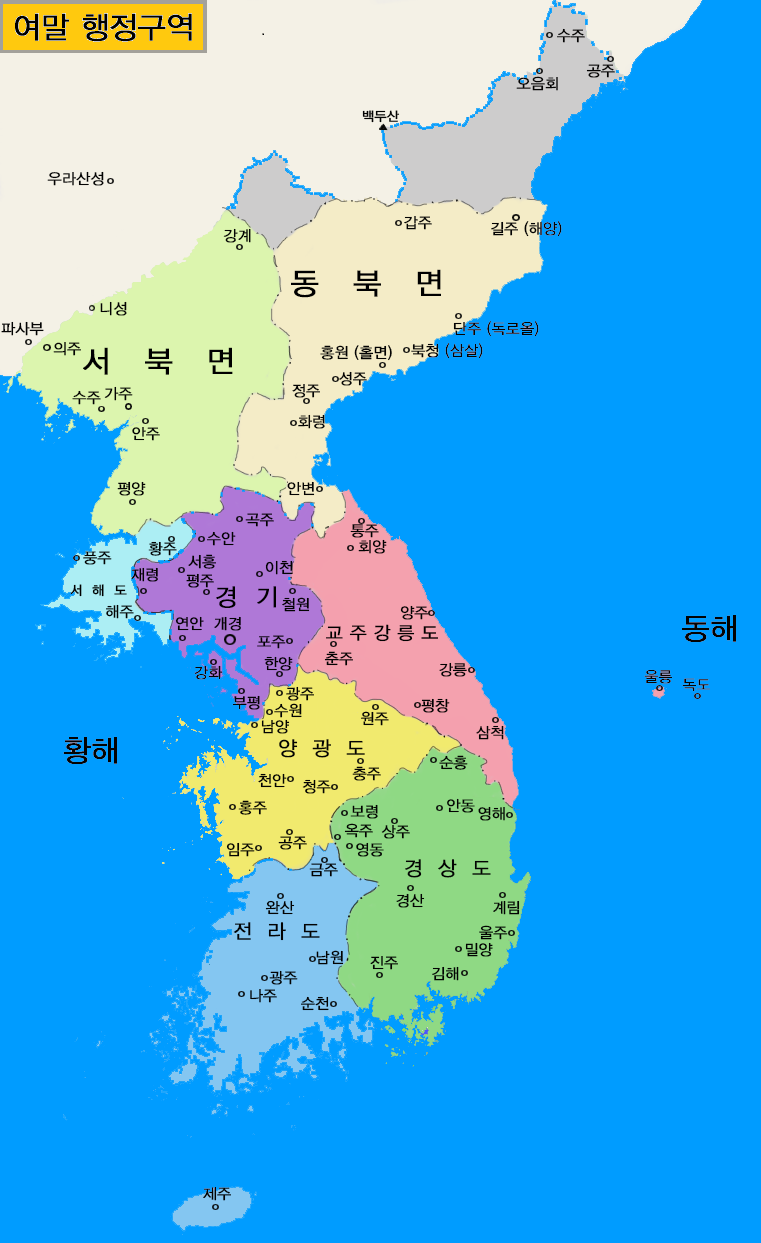
Provinces of Goryeo during the Late Goryeo period

Goryeo was established in the 10th century, and had its capital at Gaegyeong (now Kaesong). It conquered Silla and Later Baekje, and also conquered parts of the former territory of Goguryeo. Goryeo had three subcapitals: Donggyeong (now Gyeongju), Namgyeong (now Seoul), and Seogyeong (now Pyongyang).

Goryeo reorganized its provinces several times. Originally, the country had one royal district (기내; 畿內; ginae) around Gaegyeong and twelve administrative districts (목; 牧; mok). In 995, the twelve districts were redivided into ten provinces (도; 道; do). In 1005, the ten provinces were again redivided, this time into five provinces and two frontier districts (계; 界; gye). Gyojudo later became its own province after 1178, making it six provinces and two frontier districts.

Provinces of Goryeo over time
Provinces (pre-995)	Provinces (995–1005)	Provinces (post-1005)	Modern equivalent	Silla equivalent
Yangju-mok (揚州牧)	Gwannae-do (관내도)	Seohae-do (西海道,서해도)	Hwanghae	Hanju
Hwangju-mok (黃州牧)	Gwannae-do (관내도)	Seohae-do (西海道,서해도)	North Hwanghae	Hanju
Haeju-mok (海州牧)	Gwannae-do (관내도)	Seohae-do (西海道,서해도)	South Hwanghae	Hanju
Gwangju-mok (廣州牧)	Gwannae-do (관내도)	Yanggwang-do (楊廣道,양광도)	Gyeonggi	Hanju
Chungju-mok (忠州牧)	Jungwon-do (중원도)	Yanggwang-do (楊廣道,양광도)	North Chungcheong	Hanju
Cheongju-mok	Jungwon-do (중원도)	Yanggwang-do (楊廣道,양광도)	North Chungcheong	Ungju
Gongju-mok	Hanam-do (하남도)	Yanggwang-do (楊廣道,양광도)	South Chungcheong	Ungju
Jeonju-mok (全州牧)	Gangnam-do (강남도)	Jeolla-do (전라도)	Jeonbuk	Jeonju
Naju-mok	Haeyang-do (해양도)	Jeolla-do (전라도)	South Jeolla	Muju
Seungju-mok	Haeyang-do (해양도)	Jeolla-do (전라도)	South Jeolla	Muju
Sangju-mok	Yeongnam-do (영남도)	Gyeongsang-do (경상도)	North Gyeongsang	Sangju
Jinju-mok	Sannam-do (산남도)	Gyeongsang-do (경상도)	Western South Gyeongsang	Gangju
Jinju-mok	Yeongdong-do (영동도)	Gyeongsang-do (경상도)	Eastern South Gyeongsang	Yangju
—	Sakbang-do (삭방도)	Gyoju-do (교주도,交州道), also known as gyoju gangneungdo (交州江陵道,교주강릉도) (Note: Initially installed from part of Donggye in 1178 as Chunchudo (춘주도,春州道).Was once called Dongjudo (동주도,東州道) but named as gyojudo in 1263.From 1314 to 1388 it was known as Hoeyangdo (회양도,淮陽道)as a result of demotion of Gyojumok under Hoeyang.From 1388 to 1392, it was known as gyojugangneungdo after merging with gangneungdo (강릉도,江陵道).)	Gangwon	Sakju
—	Sakbang-do (삭방도)	Donggye (東界,동계), also known as Dongbukmyeon (東北面,동북면)	Gangwon	Myeongju
—	Paeseo-do (패서도)	Bukgye (北界,북계), also known as Seobukmyeon (西北面,서북면))	Pyeongan	—

== Provinces of Joseon ==
The Eight Provinces (Paldo)

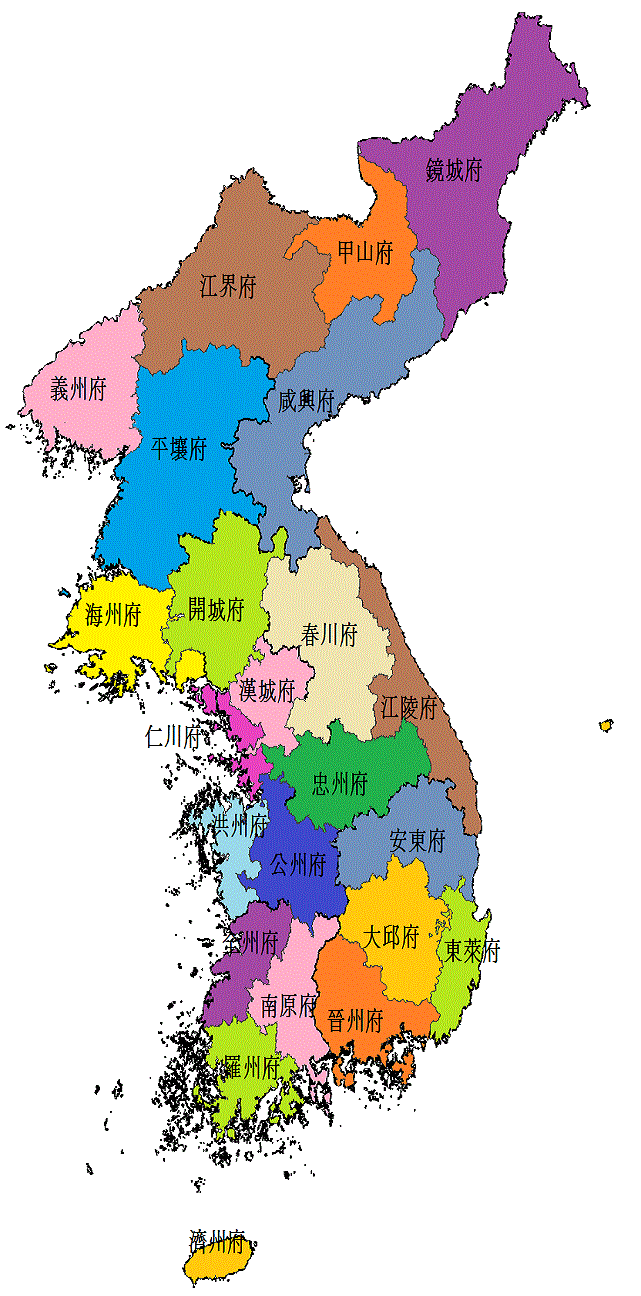
23 Districts (Isipsambu)

13 Provinces (Sipsamdo)

In 1413, Korea (at that time called Joseon) was divided into eight provinces: Chungcheong, Gangwon, Gyeonggi, Gyeongsang, Jeolla, Hamgyŏng (originally called Yeonggil), Hwanghae (originally called P'unghae), and P'yŏngan.

RR Romaja	M–R Romaja	Hangul	Hanja	Name origin	Capital	Region	Korean dialect	Post-1896 Provinces
Chungcheong	Ch'ungch'ŏng	충청도	忠淸道	Chungju (충주 忠州), Cheongju (청주 淸州)	Gongju	Hoseo	Chungcheong dialect	North Chungcheong; South Chungcheong
Gangwon	Kangwŏn	강원도	江原道	Gangneung (강릉 江陵), Wonju (원주 原州)	Wonju	Gwandong (Yeongseo, Yeongdong (Note: "Gwandong" is the name for the region as a whole, with "Yeongseo" denoting the western half of the province and "Yeongdong" the eastern half. "Yeongdong" is used more often than either of the other two terms, however, especially in reference to railway and road arteries that cross through Gangwon, connecting the Seoul and Yeongdong regions.)	Gangwon dialect	Gangwon
Gyeonggi	Kyŏnggi	경기도	京畿道	(See note)	Hanseong (Seoul)	Gijeon (Note: The province's name literally means "area within a 500-li (200-km) radius" (gi; 畿) of the "capital" (Gyeong; 京), referring to the royal capital Hanseong (modern-day Seoul). The regional name "Gijeon" is obsolete. The 20th-century term "Sudogwon" ("Capital Region") is used today to denote the Seoul-Incheon conurbation and that part of Gyeonggi Province that forms part of the same built-up, urban area.)	Seoul dialect	Gyeonggi
Gyeongsang	Kyŏngsang	경상도	慶尙道	Gyeongju (경주 慶州), Sangju (상주 尙州)	Daegu	Yeongnam	Gyeongsang dialect	North Gyeongsang; South Gyeongsang
Hamgyeong	Hamgyŏng	함경도	咸鏡道	Hamhung (함흥 咸興), Kyongsong (경성 鏡城)	Hamhung	Kwanbuk, Kwannam (Note: "Gwanbuk" was used to designate either the province as whole, or only the northern part thereof. In the latter case, "Gwannam" was then used to denote the southern part of the province.)	Hamgyŏng dialect	North Hamgyong; South Hamgyong
Hwanghae	Hwanghae	황해도	黃海道	Hwangju (황주 黃州), Haeju (해주 海州)	Haeju	Haeso	Hwanghae dialect	Hwanghae (Note: The modern-day division of the province into North and South did not occur until 1954.)
Jeolla	Chŏlla	전라도	全羅道	Jeonju (전주 全州), Naju (나주 羅州) (Note: The initial "n" in "Naju" is pronounced as "l" (lower-case "L") when it comes after another consonant; the final "n" in the "Jeon" of "Jeonju" is then assimilated to an "l" sound.)	Jeonju	Honam	Jeolla dialect; Jeju language (Note: The distinctive Jeju dialect is used on Jeju Island, which became a separate province in 1946.)	North Jeolla; South Jeolla
Pyeongan	P'yŏngan	평안도	平安道	Pyongyang (평양 平壤), Anju (안주 安州)	Pyongyang	Kwanso	Pyongan dialect	North Pyongan; South Pyongan

=== Districts of Late Joseon period ===
In 1895, Korea was redivided into 23 districts (Bu; 부; 府), each named for the city or county that was its capital. The districts were short-lived, however, as the following year, the provincial system was restored.

- Andong
- Chuncheon
- Chungju
- Daegu
- Dongnae
- Gangneung
- Gongju
- Haeju
- Hamhŭng
- Hanseong
- Hongju
- Incheon
- Jeju
- Jeonju
- Jinju
- Kaesŏng
- Kanggye
- Kapsan
- Kyŏngsŏng
- Naju
- Namwon
- P'yŏngyang
- Ŭiju

== Provinces of the Korean Empire ==
In 1896, the former eight provinces were restored, with five of them (Chungcheong, Gyeongsang, Jeolla, Hamgyŏng, and P'yŏngan) being divided into North and South Provinces (Bukdo (북도; 北道) and Namdo (남도; 南道) respectively). The resulting system of thirteen provinces lasted until the Division of Korea in 1945.

The thirteen provinces were: North and South Chungcheong, Gangwon, Gyeonggi, North and South Gyeongsang, North and South Hamgyŏng, Hwanghae, North and South Jeolla, and North and South P'yŏngan.

== Provinces of Chōsen ==
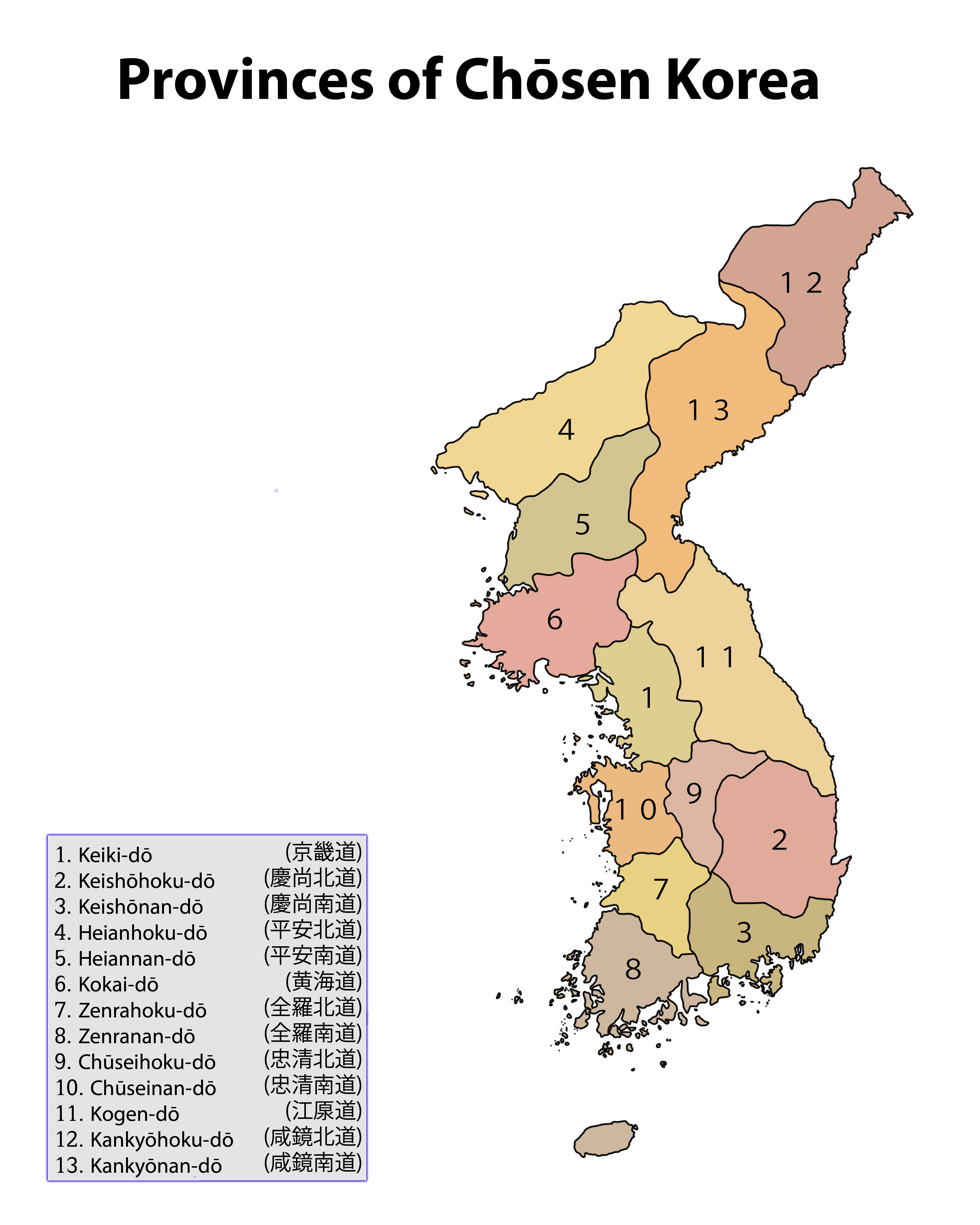
Provinces of Korea during Japanese rule

Under Colonial Japanese rule, Korean provinces of Korean Empire, remained much the same, only taking on the Japanese reading of the hanja. The Provinces of Chōsen were:

Japanese name	Kanji	Kana	Korean name	Hangul
Chūseihoku-dō	忠清北道	ちゅうせいほくどう	Chungcheongbuk-do	충청북도
Chūseinan-dō	忠淸南道	ちゅうせいなんどう	Chungcheongnam-do	충청남도
Keishōhoku-dō	慶尚北道	けいしょうほくどう	Gyeongsangbuk-do	경상북도
Keishōnan-dō	慶尚南道	けいしょうなんどう	Gyeongsangnam-do	경상남도
Heianhoku-dō	平安北道	へいあんほくどう	Pyeonganbuk-do	평안북도
Heian'nan-dō	平安南道	へいあんなんどう	Pyeongannam-do	평안남도
Kōgen-dō	江原道	こうげんどう	Gangwon-do	강원도
Kōkai-dō	黃海道	こうかいどう	Hwanghae-do	황해도
Kankyōhoku-dō	咸鏡北道	かんきょうほくどう	Hamgyeongbuk-do	함경북도
Kankyōnan-dō	咸鏡南道	かんきょうなんどう	Hamgyeongnam-do	함경남도
Zenranan-dō	全羅南道	ぜんらなんどう	Jeollanam-do	전라남도
Zenrahoku-dō	全羅北道	ぜんらほくどう	Jeollabuk-do	전라북도
Keiki-dō	京畿道	けいきどう	Gyeonggi-do	경기도

== Provincial divisions since the division of Korea ==
Provinces of North and South Korea

At the end of World War II in 1945, Korea was divided into Northern Korea and Southern Korea under trusteeship of the Soviet Union and the United States. The peninsula was divided at the 38th parallel in 1945. In 1948, the two zones became the independent countries of North Korea and South Korea.

Three provinces—Hwanghae, Gyeonggi, and Gangwon—were divided by the 38th parallel.

- Most of Hwanghae Province belonged to the Northern zone. The southern portion became part of Gyeonggi Province in the south.
- Most of Gyeonggi Province belonged to the Southern zone. In 1946, the northern portion became part of Hwanghae Province in the north.
- Gangwon Province was divided roughly in half, to form modern-day Gangwon Province in South Korea and Kangwon Province in North Korea. The northern province is expanded in 1946 to include some area around the city of Wonsan (Originally part of South Hamgyong Province)

Also in 1946, the cities of Seoul in the south and Pyongyang in the north separated from Gyeonggi and South Pyongan Provinces respectively to become Special Cities. Both North Korea and South Korea have subsequently upgraded other cities to a level equal to a province, and these cities (special cities of North Korea and special cities of South Korea [qq.v.]) are sometimes counted along with provinces.

Finally, the new provinces of Jeju Province (in the south, in 1946) and Chagang Province (in the north, 1949) were formed, from parts of South Jeolla and North Pyongan respectively. In 1954, Ryanggang Province was split from South Hamgyong and Hwanghae was divided into North and South Hwanghae Provinces.

The following table lists the present provincial divisions in the Korean Peninsula.

RR Romaja	M–R Romaja	Hangul/Chosongul	Hanja	ISO	Type	Area	Capital	Region	Country
Busan	Pusan	부산시	釜山市	KR-26	City	767	Yeonje	Yeongnam	South Korea
North Chungcheong	North Ch'ungch'ŏng	충청북도	忠清北道	KR-43	Province	7,436	Cheongju	Hoseo	South Korea
South Chungcheong	South Ch'ungch'ŏng	충청남도	忠清南道	KR-44	Province	8,352	Hongseong	Hoseo	South Korea
Daegu	Taegu	대구시	大邱市	KR-27	City	884	Jung	Yeongnam	South Korea
Daejeon	Taejŏn	대전시	大田市	KR-30	City	539	Seo	Hoseo	South Korea
Gangwon	Kangwŏn	강원도	江原道	KR-42	Province	16,894	Chuncheon	Gwandong	South Korea
Gangwon	Kangwŏn	강원도	江原道	KP-07	Province	11,091	Wonsan	Gwandong	North Korea
Gwangju	Kwangju	광주시	光州市	KR-29	City	501	Seo	Honam	South Korea
Gyeonggi	Kyŏnggi	경기도	京畿道	KR-41	Province	10,131	Suwon	Sudogwon	South Korea
North Gyeongsang	North Kyŏngsang	경상북도	慶尙北道	KR-47	Province	19,440	Andong	Yeongnam	South Korea
South Gyeongsang	South Kyŏngsang	경상남도	慶尙南道	KR-48	Province	11,859	Changwon	Yeongnam	South Korea
North Hamgyeong	North Hamgyŏng	함경북도	咸鏡北道	KP-09	Province	15,980	Chongjin	Kwanbuk	North Korea
South Hamgyeong	South Hamgyŏng	함경남도	咸鏡南道	KP-08	Province	18,534	Hamhung	Kwannam	North Korea
North Hwanghae	North Hwanghae	황해북도	黃海北道	KP-06	Province	8,154	Sariwon	Haeso	North Korea
South Hwanghae	South Hwanghae	황해남도	黃海南道	KP-05	Province	8,450	Haeju	Haeso	North Korea
Incheon	Inch'ŏn	인천시	仁川市	KR-28	City	1,029	Namdong	Sudogwon	South Korea
Jagang	Chagang	자강도	慈江道	KP-04	Province	16,765	Kanggye	Kwanso	North Korea
Jeju	Cheju	제주도	濟州道	KR-49	Province	1,846	Jeju City	Jejudo	South Korea
North Jeolla	North Chŏlla	전북특별자치도	全北特別自治道	KR-45	Province	8,043	Jeonju	Honam	South Korea
South Jeolla	South Chŏlla	전라남도	全羅南道	KR-46	Province	11,858	Muan	Honam	South Korea
Nampo	Namp'o	남포시	南浦市	KP-??	City	829	Kangsŏ	Kwanso	North Korea
Naseon	Rasŏn	나선시/라선시	羅先市	KP-13	City	746	Rajin	Kwanbuk	North Korea
North Pyeongan	North P'yŏngan	평안북도	平安北道	KP-03	Province	12,680	Sinuiju	Kwanso	North Korea
South Pyeongan	South P'yŏngan	평안남도	平安南道	KP-02	Province	11,891	Pyongsong	Kwanso	North Korea
Pyongyang	P'yŏngyang	평양시	平壤市	KP-01	City	1,100	Chung	Kwanso	North Korea
Gaeseong	Kaesŏng	개성시	開城市	none	City	442	Kaepung	Haeso	North Korea
Yanggang	Ryanggang	양강도/량강도	兩江道	KP-10	Province	13,880	Hyesan	Kwannam	North Korea
Sejong	Sejong	세종시	世宗市	KR-50	City	465	Hansol	Hoseo	South Korea
Seoul	Sŏul	서울시	서울市^{[1]}	KR-11	City	605	Jung	Sudogwon	South Korea
Ulsan	Ulsan	울산시	蔚山市	KR-31	City	1,057	Nam	Yeongnam	South Korea

Notes
^{1} See Names of Seoul.

== See also ==
- List of South Korean regions by GDP
- List of provinces of Balhae
- Goguryeo#Government
