= Guksu =

Go competition in South Korea

The Guksu (Korean: 국수전, Hanja: 國手戰) was a Go competition in South Korea. It was held 59 times beginning in 1956, and was discontinued in 2016.

== Outline ==
The Guksu was a Go competition held by the Hanguk Kiwon, and sponsored by The Dong-a Ilbo. Guksu literally means 'hand of the nation', or essentially the best player in the country. It was the longest-running Korean Go competition. Each year, a tournament was held to determine a challenger, who would play against the defending champion. (The only exceptions were the 1st Guksu and the 53rd Guksu in 2009, when the titleholder Lee Sedol went on leave and did not defend his title.)

When the competition was last held (the 59th Guksu), the winner's prize was 45 million won, and the runner-up's prize was 15 million won.

== Past winners and runners-up ==
	Year	Winner	Score	Runner-up
1	1956	Cho Namchul		Shin Ho-yeol
2	1957	Cho Namchul	7–0	Min Yeong-hyeon
3	1958	Cho Namchul	4–0	Kim Myeong-hwan
4	1959	Cho Namchul	2–1	Kim Myeong-hwan
5	1960	Cho Namchul	2–1	Kim Bong-seon
6	1961	Cho Namchul	3–1	Kim In
7	1962	Cho Namchul	3–1	Lee Chang-se
8	1963	Cho Namchul	3–2	Lee Chang-se
9	1964	Cho Namchul	3–1	Yun Ki-hyeon
10	1965	Kim In	3–1	Cho Namchul
11	1966	Kim In	3–0	Yun Ki-hyeon
12	1967	Kim In	3–0	Yun Ki-hyeon
13	1968	Kim In	3–1	Cho Namchul
14	1969	Kim In	3–0	Kim Jae-gu
15	1970	Kim In	3–2	Cho Namchul
16	1971	Yun Ki-hyeon	3–2	Kim In
17	1972	Yun Ki-hyeon	3–1	No Yeong-ha
18	1973	Ha Chan-seok	3–1	Yun Ki-hyeon
19	1974	Ha Chan-seok	3–1	Kang Cheol-min
20	1976	Cho Hun-hyeon	3–1	Ha Chan-seok
21	1977	Cho Hun-hyeon	3–0	Hong Jong-hyeon
22	1978	Cho Hun-hyeon	3–0	Kim Sujang
23	1979	Cho Hun-hyeon	3–0	Ha Chan-seok
24	1980	Cho Hun-hyeon	3–0	Seo Bong-soo
25	1981	Cho Hun-hyeon	3–1	Seo Bong-soo
26	1982	Cho Hun-hyeon	3–1	Seo Bong-soo
27	1983	Cho Hun-hyeon	3–2	Seo Bong-soo
28	1984	Cho Hun-hyeon	3–1	Seo Bong-soo
29	1985	Cho Hun-hyeon	3–0	Seo Bong-soo
30	1986	Seo Bong-soo	3–0	Cho Hun-hyeon
31	1987	Seo Bong-soo	3–1	Cho Hun-hyeon
32	1988	Cho Hun-hyeon	3–0	Seo Bong-soo
33	1989	Cho Hun-hyeon	3–1	Lee Chang-ho
34	1990	Lee Chang-ho	3–0	Cho Hun-hyeon
35	1991	Cho Hun-hyeon	3–2	Lee Chang-ho
36	1992	Cho Hun-hyeon	3–1	Lee Chang-ho
37	1993	Lee Chang-ho	3–0	Cho Hun-hyeon
38	1994	Lee Chang-ho	3–2	Cho Hun-hyeon
39	1995	Lee Chang-ho	3–1	Cho Hun-hyeon
40	1996	Lee Chang-ho	3–2	Cho Hun-hyeon
41	1997	Lee Chang-ho	3–1	Seo Bong-soo
42	1998	Cho Hun-hyeon	2–0	Lee Chang-ho
43	1999	Rui Naiwei	2–1	Cho Hun-hyeon
44	2000	Cho Hun-hyeon	3–0	Rui Naiwei
45	2001	Lee Chang-ho	3–1	Cho Hun-hyeon
46	2002	Lee Chang-ho	3–0	Cho Han-seung
47	2003	Choi Cheol-han	3–2	Lee Chang-ho
48	2004	Choi Cheol-han	3–0	Lee Chang-ho
49	2005	Lee Chang-ho	3–2	Choi Cheol-han
50	2006	Yun Jun-sang	3–1	Lee Chang-ho
51	2007	Lee Sedol	3–0	Yun Jun-sang
52	2008	Lee Sedol	3–1	Mok Jin-seok
53	2009	Lee Chang-ho	3–1	Hong Ki-pyo
54	2010	Choi Cheol-han	3–1	Lee Chang-ho
55	2011	Cho Hanseung	3–2	Choi Cheol-han
56	2012	Cho Hanseung	3–0	Choi Cheol-han
57	2013	Cho Hanseung	3–1	Lee Sedol
58	2014	Park Junghwan	3–1	Cho Hanseung
59	2015	Park Junghwan	3–0	Cho Hanseung
