= Keiki Province =

1910–1945 province of Korea under Japan

Coordinates: 37°30′N 127°0′E

Keiki-dō 京畿道
- Former province of Korea under the Empire of Japan
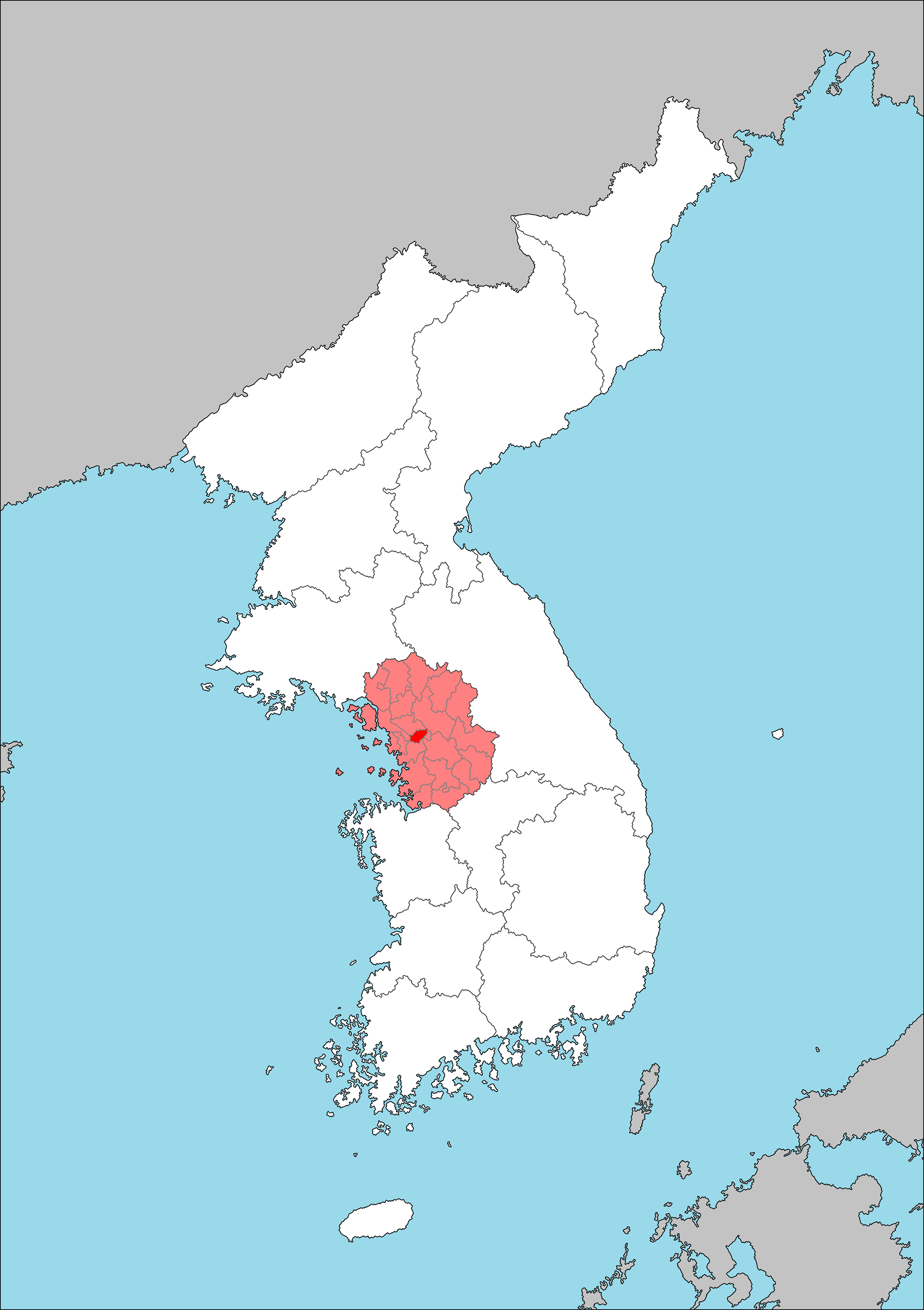
- Capital: Keijō
- Today part of: South Korea; North Korea

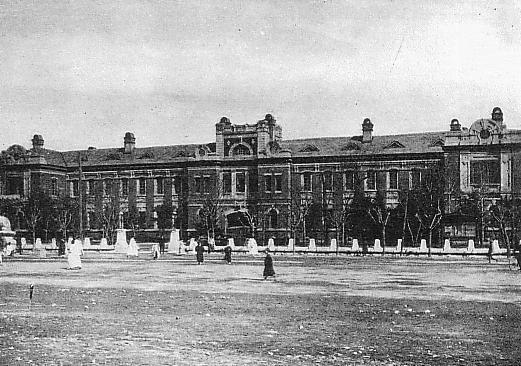
Keiki Provincial Office

Keiki-dō (京畿道; Korean: 경기도), alternatively Keiki Province, was a province of Korea under Japanese rule. Its capital was at Keijō (Seoul). The province consisted of what is now the South Korean territories of Seoul and Gyeonggi, as well as parts of what is now southern North Korea.

== Population ==
Year	Population
1925	1,889,899
1930	2,004,012
1940	2,668,119
1944	2,886,643

Number of people by nationality according to the 1936 census:

- Overall population: 2,392,296 people
  - Japanese: 153,723 people
  - Koreans: 2,225,379 people
  - Other: 13,194 people

== Administrative divisions ==
The following list is based on the administrative divisions of 1945:

=== Cities ===
- Keijō (京城府) - (capital) aka Gyeongseong (경성), present day Seoul.

Wards of Keijō
Japanese name	Korean name
Eitōho-ku (永登浦区)	Yeongdeungpo-gu (영등포구)
Jōtō-ku (城東区)	Seongdong-gu (성동구)
Shōro-ku (鐘路区)	Jongno-gu (종로구)
Seidaimon-ku (西大門区)	Seodaemun-gu (서대문구)
Chū-ku (中区)	Jung-gu (중구)
Tōdaimon-ku (東大門区)	Dongdaemun-gu (동대문구)
Ryūzan-ku (龍山区)	Yongsan-gu (용산구)
Maho-ku (麻浦区)	Mapo-gu (마포구)

Emblem of Jinsen

Emblem of Kaijō

- Jinsen (仁川府): Incheon (인천부). present Incheon Metropolitan City.
- Kaijō (開城府): Gaeseong (개성부). present Gaeseong Special City.

=== Towns and villages ===
These are the towns and villages in each district:

- Kōyō (高陽): Goyang (고양). present Goyang City, Mapo District and Eunpyeong District in Seoul Special City.
- Kōshū (廣州): Gwangju, Gyeonggi (광주). present Gwangju City, Seongnam City, Hanam City, Gangnam District, Seocho District, Songpa District and Gangdong District in Seoul Special City.
- Yōshū (楊州): Yangju (양주). present Yangju City, Dongducheon City, Uijeongbu City, Guri City, Namyangju City, Seongbuk District, Gangbuk District, Dobong District, Nowon District, Jungnang District and Gwangjin District in Seoul Special City.
- Rensen (漣川): Yeoncheon (연천).
- Hōsen (抱川): Pocheon (포천).
- Kahei (加平): Gapyeong (가평).
- Yōhei (楊平): Yangpyeong (양평).
- Reishū (驪州): Yeoju (여주).
- Risen (利川): Icheon (이천).
- Ryūjin (龍仁): Yongin (용인).
- Anjō (安城): Anseong (안성).
- Heitaku (平澤): Pyeongtaek (평택).
- Suigen (水原): Suwon (수원). present Suwon City, Osan City and Hwaseong City.
- Shikō (始興): Siheung (시흥). present Siheung City, Gwangmyeong City, Ansan City, Anyang City, Gunpo City, Uiwang City, Gwacheon City, Dongjak District, Gwanak District, Guro District, Geumcheon District in Seoul Special City.
- Fusen (富川): Bucheon (부천). present Bucheon City, Bupyeong District, Namdong District, Yeonsu District in Incheon Metropolitan City, Guro District in Seoul Special City.
- Kinpo (金浦): Gimpo (김포). present Gimpo City, Gyeyang District, Seo District in Incheon Metropolitan City, Yangcheon District and Gangseo District in Seoul Special City.
- Kōka (江華): Ganghwa (강화).
- Hashū (坡州): Paju (파주).
- Chōtan (長湍): Jangdan (장단).
- Kaihō (開豊): Gaepung (개풍). present Gaeseong Special City.

== Provincial governors ==
The following people were provincial ministers before August 1919. This was then changed to the title of governor.

Nationality	Name	Name in kanji	Start of tenure	End of tenure	Notes
Japanese	Higaki Naosuke	檜垣 直右	October 1, 1910	March 28, 1916	Provincial minister
Japanese	Matsunaga Takekichi	松永 武吉	March 28, 1916	September 26, 1919	Provincial minister before August 1919
Japanese	Kudō Eiichi	工藤 英一	September 26, 1919	February 24, 1923	
Japanese	Takizane Akiho	時實 秋穗	February 24, 1923	March 8, 1926	
Japanese	Yoneda Jintarō	米田 甚太郞	March 8, 1926	January 21, 1929	
Japanese	Watanabe Shinobu	渡邊 忍	January 21, 1929	September 23, 1931	
Japanese	Matsumoto Makoto	松本 誠	September 23, 1931	November 5, 1934	
Japanese	Tominaga Fumikazu	富永 文一	November 5, 1934	May 21, 1936	
Japanese	Seiichirō Yasui	安井 誠一郞	May 21, 1936	October 16, 1936	
Japanese	Yunomura Tatsujirō	湯村 辰二郎	October 16, 1936	July 3, 1937	
Japanese	Kanza Yoshikuni	甘蔗 義邦	July 3, 1937	May 30, 1940	
Japanese	Suzukawa Toshio	鈴川 壽男	May 30, 1940	November 19, 1941	
Japanese	Matsuzawa Tatsuo	松沢 龍雄	November 19, 1941	April 7, 1942	
Japanese	Tange Ikutarō	丹下 郁太郎	April 7, 1942	June 2, 1942	
Japanese	Kō Yasuhiko	高 安彦	June 2, 1942	December 1, 1943	
Japanese	Seto Michikazu	瀬戸 道一	December 1, 1943	June 16, 1945	
Japanese	Ikuta Seizaburō	生田 清三郎	June 16, 1945	August 15, 1945	Korean independence

== See also ==
- Provinces of Korea
- Governor-General of Chōsen
- Administrative divisions of Korea
