= Kiseong =

- Hangul: 기성전
- Hanja: 棋聖戰
- RR: Giseongjeon
- MR: Kisŏngjŏn

The Kiseong (Korean: 기성전) was a Go competition in South Korea.

== Outline ==
The Kiseong was a Go competition used by the Hanguk Kiwon. It was the Hanguk Kiwon equivalent to the Nihon-Kiin's Kisei competition and was sponsored by the Segye Ilbo (World Newspaper). The white komi was 6.5 points. The time limits for the final was five hours, while the rest of the tournament had four hours of thinking time. The winner's purse was 18,000,000 SKW ($18,000).

The last year of the competition was 2008.

== Past winners ==
Player	Years Held
Cho Hun-hyeon	1990, 1991
Yoo Changhyuk	1991
Lee Chang-ho	1993—2003
Choi Cheol-han	2004
Park Young-Hoon	2005–2008

== See also ==
- Kisei
