= U.S.–Canada Team Tournament (Go) =

The U.S.–Canada Team Tournament is an internet-hosted series of team Go matches, pitting strong Dan Go players from the United States versus Canadian counterparts. The tournament is held in the "USA vs Canada Team Tournament" room of the KGS Go Server, and has been held since 2007. Time limits are one hour of main time, plus ten periods of one-minute byoyomi, per player.

The team may be restricted to players of one sex, or mixed teams.

== The First U.S.-Canada Team Tournament ==
The First U.S.-Canada Team Tournament was held from October 26 to October 29, 2007. Results:

USA	7 : 4	Canada
Huiren Yang 8d W	W+0.5	Yongfei Ge 9d B
Andy Liu 8d B	W+R	Jing Yang 8d W
Zhaonian Chen 8d W	W+R	Zhiqi Yu B
Eric Lui 8d B	B+R	Jun Fan W
Jie Liang 8d W	B+R	Xiandong Zhang B
Minshan Shou 8d B	B+R	Dewu Zhang W
Thomas Hsiang 7d W	W+R	Sarah Yu B
I-han Lui 7d B	W+R	Hank Xie W
Xiliang Liu 7d W	W+5.5	William Shi B
Young Kwon 7d B	W+10.5	Jeffrey Fung W
Changlong Wu 6d W	W+R	Liang Yu B

== The Second U.S.-Canada Team Tournament ==
Super Go system was used in the Second U.S.-Canada Team Tournament, which was held in 2009.

=== Schedule and result ===
The winner of each game is depicted in bold.

Game	Date	USA	8 : 10	Canada
1	June 13	**Andy Liu** 9d (White)	W+R	William Shi (Black)
2	June 14	Andy Liu (Black) 9d	W+R	**Tiger Gong** (White)
3	June 20	Trevor Morris 7d (White)	B+R	**Tiger Gong** (Black)
4	June 21	Calvin Sun 7d (Black)	W+4.5	**Tiger Gong** (White)
5	June 27	Seung Hyun Hong 7d (White)	B+3.5	**Tiger Gong** (Black)
6	June 28	**Yue Zhang** 7d (Black)	B+T	Tiger Gong (White)
7	July 4	Yue Zhang 7d (White)	B+R	**Hank Xie** (Black)
8	July 5	Jie Liang 7d (Black)	W+R	**Hank Xie** (White)
9	July 11	**Zhaonian Chen** 8d (White)	W+R	Hank Xie (Black)
10	July 12	**Zhaonian Chen** 8d (Black)	B+R	James Sedgwick (White)
11	July 18	**Zhaonian Chen** 8d (White)	W+R	Ryan Li (Black)
12	July 19	**Zhaonian Chen** 8d (Black)	B+R	Xiandong Zhang (White)
13	July 25	ZhaoNian Chen 8d (White)	B+3.5	**Juyong Koh** (Black)
14	August 15	**Jennie Shen** 8d (Black)	B+R	Juyong Koh (White)
15	August 22	**Jennie Shen** 8d (White)	W+R	Yongfei Ge (Black)
16	August 23	Jennie Shen 8d (Black)	W+R	**Jing Yang** (White)
17	August 30	Dae Hyuk Ko 8d (White)	B+R	**Jing Yang** (Black)
18	September 12	Huiren Yang 8d (Black)	W+R	**Jing Yang** (White)

Cathy Li did not need to present until team Canada won the tournament.

== The First USA-Canada Women Team Tournament ==
USA 1:1 Canada (2009)

- Xingshuo Liu B vs Sarah Yu W, W+R
- Yinli Wang B vs Amira Song W, B+R

== The Third USA-Canada Mixed Team Tournament ==
USA 7:8 Canada (2011)

1. Zhanbo Sun vs Ziyang Hu B, W+4.5
2. Huiren Yang vs Ryan Li, Yang+A
3. Dae Hyuk Ko B vs Xiandong Zhang, B+E
4. Lu Wang B vs Juyong Koh, B+R
5. Michael Chen vs Jing Yang B, W+2.5
6. Minshan Shou B vs William Shi, W+R
7. Jie Liang B vs Bill Lin, W+R
8. Yunzhe Zhang vs Jeffrey Fung B, B+3.5
9. Guochen Xie B vs Tiger Gong, W+R
10. Kevin Hong B vs James Sedgwick, W+8.5
11. Yue Zhang B vs Hank Xie, W+R
12. Yuan Zhou vs Hao Chen B, W+R
1. Yinli Wang B vs Cathy Li, W+6.5
2. Xingshuo Liu vs Sarah Yu, Yu+A
3. Chaelim Kim vs Irene Sha B, W+R
