= Kwannam =

Region of North Korea

Kwannam 관남 · 關南
- Region of North Korea
- Etymology: "South of the Ridge"
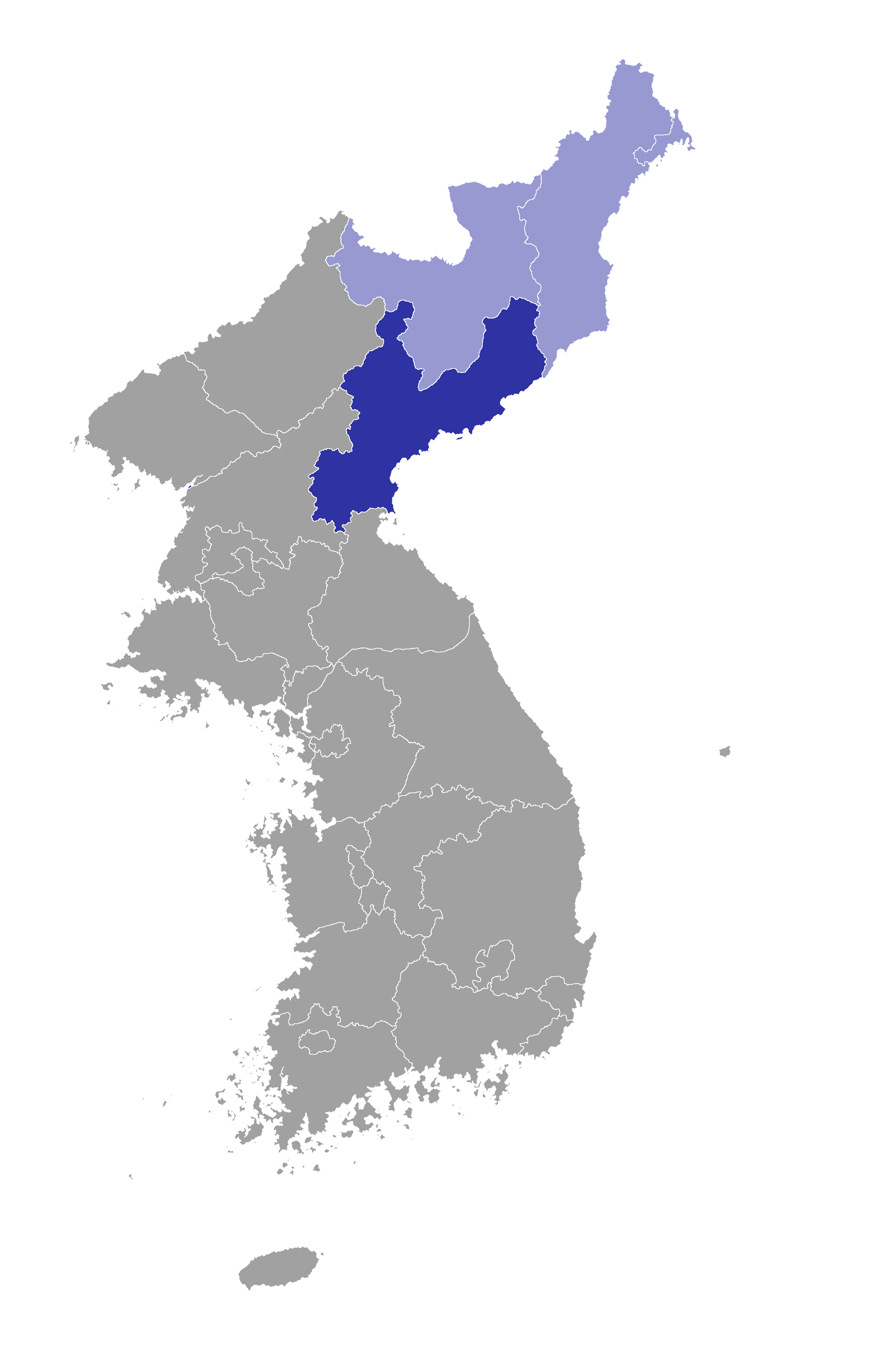
- Kwannam (dark blue) in Kwanbuk (light blue)
- Country: North Korea; South Korea (claimed)
- Divisions: 1 do, 4 kun, 2 si
- Dialects: Hamgyŏng, Kangwŏn (문화어)

- Kwannam
- Hangul: 관남지방
- Hanja: 關南地方
- Revised Romanization: Gwannam jibang
- McCune–Reischauer: Kwannam chibang

Kwannam, or Gwannam (Korean: 관남), is a subregion of Kwanbuk, a region of Korea, in the northeast of the peninsula. Kwannam traditionally encompasses South Hamgyŏng Province and Wŏnsan and Munch'ŏn Cities and Ch'ŏnnae, Pŏptong, Kosan, and Anbyŏn Counties of Kangwŏn Province in North Korea.

== Etymology ==
The region occupies most of South Hamgyong Province, so is often referred to as Hamnam (함남) as an abbreviation for the region's primary province. The name Kwannam, however, means "south of the ridge", in reference to the Mach'ŏnryŏng ridge, a part of the greater Hamgyong Mountains, that runs through South Hamgyong.
