= Zenrahoku Province =

1910–1945 province of Korea under Japan

Zenrahoku-dō 全羅北道
- Former province of Korea, Empire of Japan
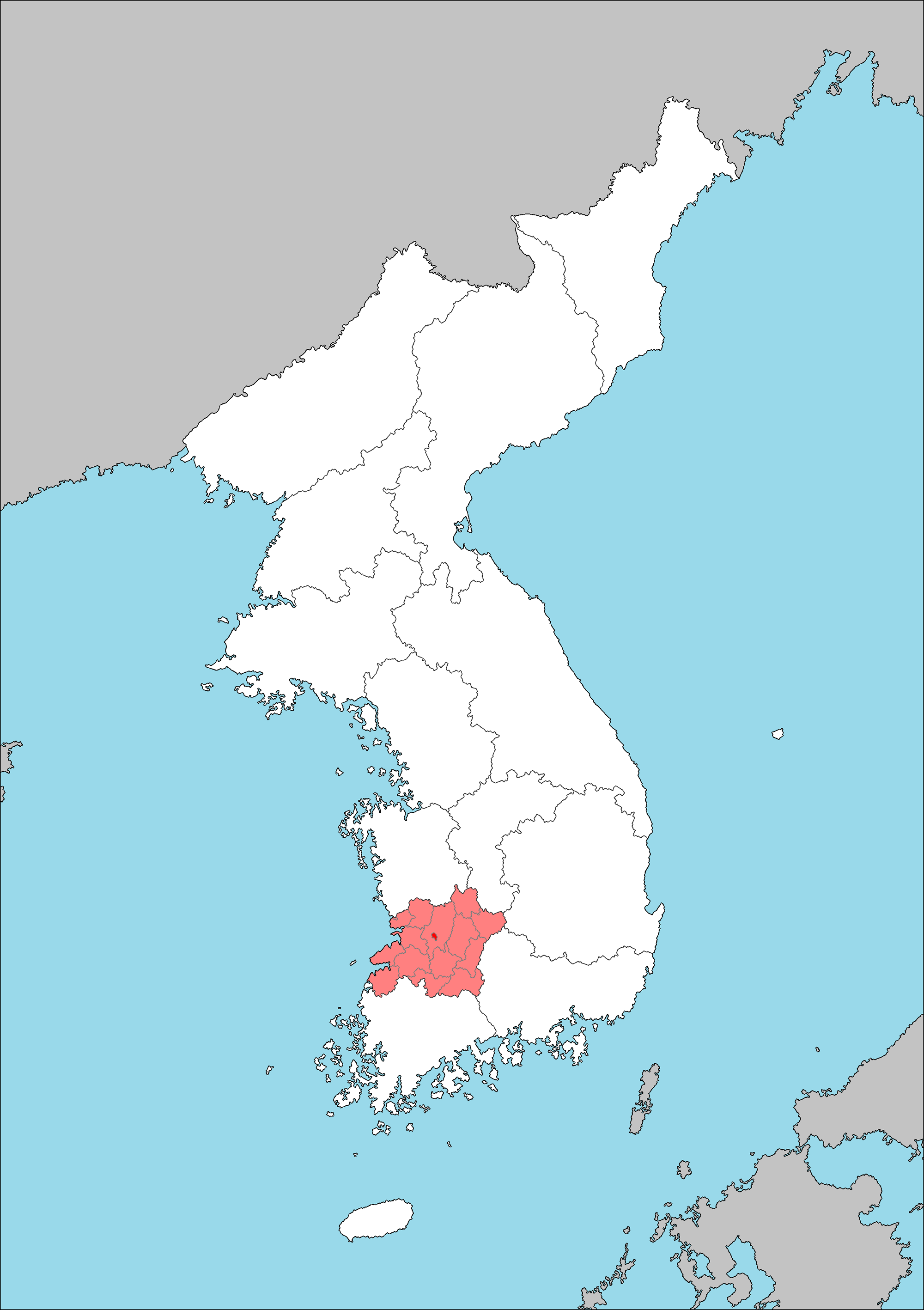
- Capital: Zenshū
- History
  - Established: 29 August 1910
  - Disestablished: 15 August 1945
- Today part of: South Korea

Zenrahoku-dō (全羅北道; Korean: 전라북도), alternatively Zenrahoku Province, Zenra Hoku, or North Zenra Province, was a province of Korea under Japanese rule. Its capital was Zenshū (Jeonju). The province consisted of what is now the South Korean province of North Jeolla.

== Population ==
Year	Population
1925	1,340,430
1930	1,467,604
1940	1,564,041
1944	1,639,213

Number of people by nationality according to the 1936 census:

- Overall population: 1,540,686 people
  - Japanese: 35,844 people
  - Koreans: 1,502,380 people
  - Other: 2,462 people

== Administrative divisions ==
The following list is based on the administrative divisions of 1945:

=== Cities ===
Emblem of Gunzan

- Zenshū (capital)
- Gunzan

=== Counties ===
- Kanshū
- Chin'an
- Kinzan
- Moshu
- Chōsui
- Ninjitsu
- Nangen
- Junshō
- Seiyū
- Kōshō
- Fuan
- Kintei
- Yokkō
- Ekizan

== Provincial governors ==
The following people were provincial ministers before August 1919. This was then changed to the title of governor.

Nationality	Name	Name in kanji/hanja	Start of tenure	End of tenure	Notes
Korean	Lee Doo-hwang	李斗璜	October 1, 1910	March 9, 1916	Provincial minister, died in office
Korean	Lee Jin-ho	李軫鎬	March 9, 1916	August 5, 1921	Provincial minister before August 1919
Japanese	Isumi Chūzō	亥角仲蔵	August 5, 1921	August 11, 1925	
Japanese	Aoki Kaizō	青木戒三	August 11, 1925	March 8, 1926	
Japanese	Watanabe Shinobu	渡辺忍	March 8, 1926	January 21, 1929	
Japanese	Hayashi Shigeki	林茂樹	January 21, 1929	December 11, 1929	
Korean	Kim Seo-kyu	金瑞圭	December 11, 1929	September 23, 1931	
Korean	Hong Seung-gyun	洪承均	September 23, 1931	September 27, 1932	
Korean	Go Won-hun	高元勳	September 27, 1932	May 21, 1936	
Korean	Kim Si-kwon	金時權	May 21, 1936	April 1, 1937	
Korean	Son Yeong-mok	孫永穆	April 1, 1937	September 2, 1940	
Korean	Rinoie Genpo	李家源甫	September 2, 1940	January 24, 1942	Had been forced to change name from Lee Won-bo (李源甫)
Korean	Kanemura Yasuo	金村泰男	January 24, 1942	August 18, 1943	Had been forced to change name from Kim Byeong-tae (金秉泰)
Korean	Kim Dae-woo	金大羽	August 18, 1943	June 16, 1945	
Korean	Kusamoto Zenki	草本然基	June 16, 1945	August 15, 1945	Had been forced to change name from Jeong Yeon-gi (鄭然基), Korean independence

== See also ==
- Provinces of Korea
- Governor-General of Chōsen
- Administrative divisions of Korea
