= Zenranan Province =

1910–1945 province of Korea under Japan

Zenranan-dō 全羅南道
- Former province of Korea, Empire of Japan
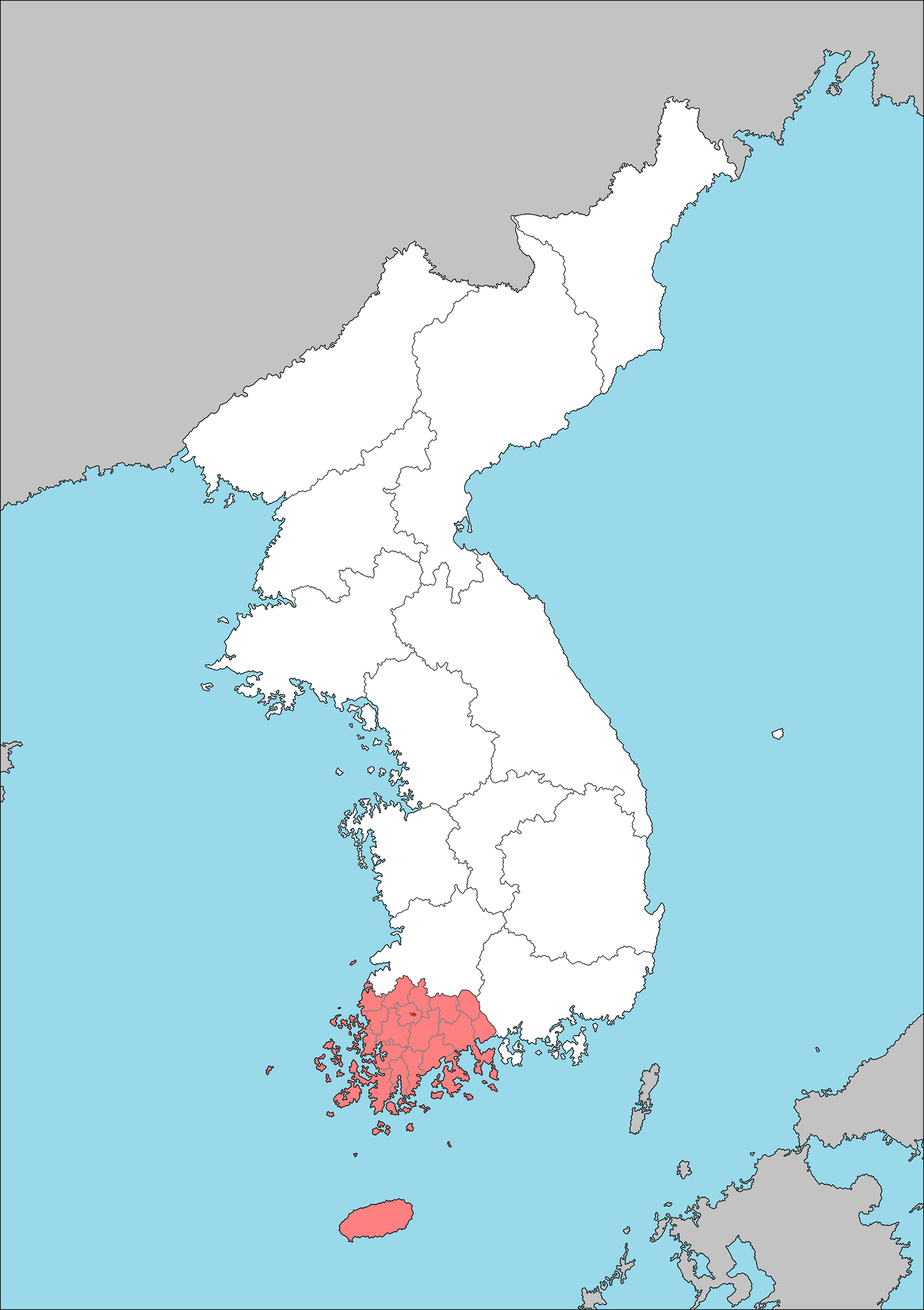
- Capital: Kōshū
- History
  - Established: August 29, 1910
  - Disestablished: August 15, 1945
- Today part of: South Korea

Zenranan-dō (全羅南道; Korean: 전라남도), alternatively Zenranan Province or South Zenra Province, was a province of Korea under Japanese rule. Its capital was Kōshū (Gwangju). The province consisted of what are now the South Korean provinces of South Jeolla and Jeju.

== Population ==
Number of people by nationality according to the 1936 census:

- Overall population: 2,416,341 people
  - Japanese: 44,154 people
  - Koreans: 2,370,853 people
  - Other: 1,334 people

== Administrative divisions ==
The following list is based on the administrative divisions of 1945:

=== Cities ===
Emblem of Moppo

Emblem of Kōshū

- Kōshū (capital)
- Moppo

=== Counties ===
- Kōzan
- Tan'yō
- Kokujō
- Kyūrei
- Kōyō
- Reisui
- Junten
- Kōkō
- Hōjō
- Wajun
- Chōkō
- Kōshin
- Kainan
- Reigan
- Muan
- Rashū
- Kanpei
- Reikō
- Chōjō
- Kantō
- Chintō

=== Islands ===
- Saishū Island

== Provincial governors ==
The following people were provincial ministers before August 1919. This was then changed to the title of governor.

Nationality	Name	Name in kanji/hanja	Start of tenure	End of tenure	Notes
Japanese	Nose Tatsugorō	能勢 辰五郎	October 1, 1910	May 15, 1911	Provincial minister, died in office
Japanese	Kudō Eiichi	工藤 英一	May 24, 1911	March 28, 1916	Provincial minister
Japanese	Miyagi Matashichi	宮木 又七	March 28, 1916	September 26, 1919	Provincial minister before August 1919
Japanese	Isumi Nakazō	亥角 仲蔵	Example	August 5, 1921	
Korean	Won Eung-sang	元應常	August 5, 1921	December 1, 1924	
Korean	Jang Heon-sik	張憲植	December 1, 1924	August 14, 1926	
Korean	Seok Jin-hyeong	石鎭衡	August 14, 1926	January 19, 1929	
Korean	Kim Seo-kyu	金瑞圭	January 19, 1929	December 11, 1929	
Japanese	Umano Seiichi	馬野 精一	December 11, 1929	September 23, 1931	
Japanese	Yajima Uzazō	矢島 杉造	September 23, 1931	February 20, 1935	
Japanese	Kondō Tsunetaka	近藤 常尚	February 20, 1935	June 29, 1936	Died in office
Japanese	Matsumoto Iori	松本 伊織	July 6, 1936	July 3, 1937	
Japanese	Shingai Hajime	新貝 肇	July 3, 1937	September 2, 1940	
Korean	Takenaga Kazuki	武永 憲樹	September 2, 1940	September 30, 1943	Had been forced to change name from Eom Chang-seob (嚴昌燮)
Japanese	Hyōdō Masaru	兵頭 儁	September 30, 1943	May 20, 1945	
Japanese	Yagi Nobuo	八木 信雄	May 20, 1945	August 15, 1945	Tenure ended with Korea's independence.

== See also ==
- Provinces of Korea
- Governor-General of Chōsen
- Administrative divisions of Korea
