= Cho Hun-hyun =

South Korean professional Go player and politician

Cho Hunhyun
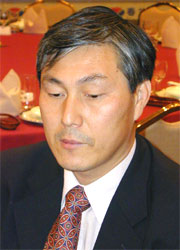

Personal information
- Native name: 조훈현 (Korean); 曺薰鉉 (Korean); Jo Hunhyeon (Revised Romanization); Cho Hunhyŏn (McCune–Reischauer)
- Full name: Cho Hunhyun
- Nickname: The God of War
- Born: 10 March 1953 (age 73) Mokpo, South Jeolla, South Korea

Sport
- Turned pro: 1962 (Korea); 1966 (Japan)
- Teacher: Kensaku Segoe, Hideyuki Fujisawa
- Pupil: Lee Chang-ho
- Rank: 9 dan
- Affiliation: Hanguk Kiwon

Cho Hun-hyun
- 조훈현

Secretary-General of the Future Korea Party
- In office 6 February 2020 – 21 March 2020
- President: Han Sun-kyo
- Preceded by: Position established
- Succeeded by: Yeom Dong-yeol

Member of the National Assembly
- In office 30 May 2016 – 29 May 2020
- Constituency: Proportional representation

Personal details
- Party: Future Korea

Cho Hunhyun (Korean: 조훈현; born 10 March 1953) is a South Korean professional Go player and politician. Considered one of the greatest players of all time, Cho reached professional level in Korea in 1962. Since then, Cho has amassed 150 professional titles, more than any other player in the world. He held all of the open tournaments in Korea three times: in 1980, 1982 and 1986. Cho has also won 11 international titles, third most in the world behind Lee Chang-ho (21) and Lee Sedol (18). He reached 1,000 career wins in 1995.

== Early life (1962–1982) ==
Cho began learning Go at the age of four and passed the test for becoming a professional in 1962. In 1963, Cho was invited to Japan. Originally intended to study under Minoru Kitani, Kensaku Segoe took Cho under his tutelage. Segoe was responsible for bringing Go Seigen to Japan and also teaching Utaro Hashimoto, founder of the Kansai Ki-in. Cho was considered a 2 dan professional in Korea, but was demoted to 4 kyu upon arriving in Japan.

Cho passed the Nihon Ki-in professional exam three years later and became the first player to hold professional certificates from two Go associations. It was at this time when Cho was introduced to Hideyuki Fujisawa. Fujisawa began mentoring Cho, and the two kept a friendly relationship between each other until Fujisawa's death in 2009. Cho participated in some Japanese tournaments, finishing runner-up to Takaho Kojima in the 3rd Shin-Ei tournament. In 1972, Cho returned to Korea to begin mandatory military service. Cho won his first title in 1973, defeating Kim In in the 14th Chaegowi. That same year, Cho lost his first title to rival Seo Bongsoo in the 6th Myungin. Since 1973, Cho and Seo have met 65 times in the finals of tournaments, with Cho winning 53 of them. Their most recent title match-up came in the 1st Daejoo Cup in 2010.

Cho continued winning several titles, including the Paewang in 1977, a title he defended sixteen straight times until 1992. In 1980, he held nine titles simultaneously: Guksu, Myungin, Wangwi, Kisung, Paewang, Kiwang, Daewang, Jaewang and the Baccus Cup. Cho repeated this twice, in 1982 and 1986, winning ten and eleven titles respectively. Despite winning several titles, Cho wasn't considered the best Korean player at the time. Instead, the media favored Cho Chikun, a Korean-born 9 dan professional in Japan. In 1980, Cho Chikun visited South Korea after winning the Meijin title and the two began a friendship match consisting of two games. The two game series was played on 31 December 1980 and 2 January 1981 with Hunhyun losing both games. From 1991 until Hunhyun's loss in the 8th Samsung Cup in 2003, Cho Hunhyun didn't lose a match to Cho Chikun.

== First Korean 9 dan (1982–2004) ==
In 1982, Cho was promoted to 9 dan, becoming the first Korean 9 dan. Cho was the sole Korean player invited to the 1st Ing Cup, which featured nine players from the Nihon Ki-in and six players from China. Cho was matched up with Taiwanese-born Japanese professional O Meien in the first round. Cho won the match and went on to defeat Koichi Kobayashi in the quarter-finals. He then met another Taiwanese-born Japanese professional Rin Kaiho in the semi-final. Cho won the best-of-three match in two games and progressed to the final to face Nie Weiping in a best-of-five final. Cho won the first game, but Nie went on to win the next two. The match came down to a fifth and final deciding game, with Cho winning by resignation.

In 1984, Cho began teaching Lee Chang-ho. Two years later, Lee became a professional and began challenging Cho. By 1989, Lee defeated Cho for the first time in a title final by winning the 29th Chaegowi. In 1992, he lost the Paewang title to Lee after defending it for sixteen consecutive years. Their rivalry would continue until 2003, when Lee won the 34th Myungin. As of 16 June 2011, the score between the two in title finals is Lee 47–19 Cho.

== Political career ==
Cho decided to go into politics, joining the Saenuri Party in March 2016. He was elected on the party's proportional representation list in the 2016 election, taking seat number 14.

On 5 February 2020, Cho was appointed as the Secretary-General of the newly formed Future Korea Party.

== Promotion record ==
Rank	Year	Notes
1 dan	1962 / 1966	
2 dan		
3 dan		
4 dan		
5 dan	1972	
6 dan		
7 dan		
8 dan		
9 dan	1982	

== Titles and runners-up ==
Ranks first in total number of titles in Korea and third in international titles.

Domestic
Title	Wins	Runners-up
Guksu	16 (1976–1985, 1988, 1989, 1991, 1992, 1998, 2000)	8 (1986, 1987, 1993–1996, 1999, 2001)
Myungin	12 (1977, 1979–1981, 1984–1990, 1997)	7 (1973, 1978, 1983, 1991, 1998, 2000, 2003)
Chunwon		2 (1996, 2002)
KBS Cup	11 (1980, 1981, 1984, 1986, 1987, 1989, 1990, 1992, 1996, 1997, 1999)	2 (1991, 1994)
Daejoo Cup	1 (2010)	1 (2011)
Wangwi	13 (1976–1979, 1981–1989)	7 (1990, 1992, 1994, 1997, 1998, 2001, 2003)
Kisung	2 (1990, 1992)	7 (1991, 1993–1996, 1998, 2003)
BC Card Cup	2 (1990, 1995)	4 (1991, 1992, 1994, 1996)
Baedalwang		1 (1996)
Chaegowi	15 (1973, 1974, 1976–1979, 1981–1988, 1992)	8 (1980, 1989, 1990, 1993–1997)
Gukgi	12 (1975–1979, 1981–1987)	3 (1980, 1988, 1992)
Paewang	20 (1977–1992, 1997–2000)	2 (1993, 2001)
Taewang	8 (1983, 1985–1987, 1989, 1990, 1994, 1995)	2 (1988, 1997)
Baccus Cup	6 (1983, 1985, 1987–1989, 1994)	
Daewang	7 (1983–1987, 1989, 1993)	3 (1993, 1995, 1996)
Paedel Cup	1 (1996)	5 (1993–1995, 1997, 1999)
KT Cup	1 (2002)	
Kiwang	12 (1979, 1981, 1982, 1984–1987, 1989–1992, 1995)	3 (1983, 1988, 1993)
SBS TV Cup		1 (1994)
Shin-Ei		1 (1971)
Total	139	67
International
Ing Cup	1 (1988)	
LG Cup		1 (2002)
Samsung Cup	2 (2001, 2002)	
Chunlan Cup	1 (1999)	
Fujitsu Cup	3 (1994, 2000, 2001)	1 (1993)
Asian TV Cup	2 (2000, 2001)	3 (1992, 1995, 2002)
Tong Yang Cup	2 (1994, 1997)	
Total	11	6
Career total
Total	150	73

== Book ==
2015, The Power of Master's Thinking
2018, Go with the Flow, is a 2015 autobiography written by Korean, professional 9-dan Cho Hunhyun and translated by You Jungmin. The original Korean edition was published in 2015 and the English edition as was published in 2018. It features a collection of eight thematic stories and self-reflections about go and life. Since he became a professional Go player at the age of nine, he has won 1,935 matches and taken various championship titles as many as 160 times over 56 years, achieving unprecedented record in the world Go history. Now, he gives what he has learned through his life, the essence of how to train our heart and mind.
