= List of professional Go tournaments =

This is a list of professional Go tournaments, for competitors in the board game of Go. The tradition, initiated by the Honinbo Tournament in Japan, is for an event to be run annually, leading up to a title match and the award of a title for one year to the winner. Tournaments do not consist, generally, of players coming together in one place for a short period, but are spread out over time.

== International ==
=== Open ===
==== Major ====
Name	First held	Frequency	Final	Main time	Byoyomi	Winner's purse
Ing Cup	1988–89	Every 4 years	Best of 5	3h 30m (Note: Players who run out of time pay a two-point penalty to receive an extra 35 minutes, and can receive extra time this way at most three times. In rounds before the finals, the main time and extra time periods are shorter.)	None	US$400,000
Samsung Cup	1996	Annual	Best of 3	2 hours	5x60s	₩300M
LG Cup	1996–97	Annual	Best of 3	3 hours	5x40s	₩300M
Chunlan Cup	1998–99	Every 2 years	Best of 3	2h 30m	5x60s	US$150,000
MLily Cup	2013	Every 2 years	Best of 5	3 hours (Note: 3 hours in the finals; 2 hours in all other games)	5x60s	RMB 1.8M
Lanke Cup	2023	Annual	Best of 3	2 hours	5x60s	RMB 1.8M

==== Defunct tournaments ====
- Bailing Cup (2012–2019) is a tournament sponsored by the Bailing Group of China every two years. Its full name is "Bailing Aitou Cup", by which it is distinguished with a Chinese national tournament with the same name "Bailing Cup". The winner's purse is 1,800,000 CNY.
- Tianfu Cup (天府杯) (2018) is a tournament sponsored by China. The winner's purse is 2,000,000 CNY.
- BC Card Cup (2009–2012) was an annual tournament sponsored by BC Card. The winner's purse was 300,000,000 Won.
- Fujitsu Cup (1988–2011) was a tournament sponsored by Fujitsu and Yomiuri Shimbun. The winner's purse was 15,000,000 Yen.
- World Oza (2002–2009) was a tournament sponsored by Toyota Denso every two years. The winner's purse was 30,000,000 Yen.
- Tong Yang Cup (1988–1998) was a competition sponsored by Tong Yang Investment Bank of South Korea.
- Zhonghuan Cup was a title sponsored by the Taiwan Qiyuan and JPMorgan Chase. The winner's purse was 2,000,000 TWD. The competition was arguably not a major tournament because players from China have never participated and the prize money is considerably less than other major ones.

=== Women's ===
- Wu Qingyuan Cup (Go Seigen Cup)

==== Defunct tournaments ====
- Bingsheng Cup (2010–2019)
- Haojue Cup
- Dali Cup

=== Asian Games ===
Go was a sport in the Asian Games in Guangzhou 2010 and Hangzhou 2022 (held in 2023 due to COVID-19). It is one of four board games in the multi-sport event, along with chess, xiangqi, and contract bridge. The 2010 competition featured three Go events: men's team, women's team, and mixed pair. Hangzhou 2022 also featured three Go events: men's individual, men's team, and women's team.

== Continental ==
=== Asia ===
Major

- Asian TV Cup is a title sponsored by NHK, KBS and CCTV.

Team

- Nongshim Cup is a title sponsored by Nongshim.
- Asian New Star Match

==== Defunct tournaments ====
- Jinro Cupun
- Teda Cup Super Match
- CSK Cup was a title sponsored by CSK.

=== China–Japan ===
- China-Japan Agon Cup is a title sponsored by Agon Shu.

==== Defunct tournaments ====
- China-Japan Meijin
- China-Japan NEC Super Go
- China-Japan Supermatches (1984–2001)
- China–Japan Tengen (1988–2002)
- China-Korea New Pro Wang was a title sponsored by BC Card.
- China–Korea Tengen (1997–2015)
- Kangwon-Land Cup was a title sponsored by Kangwon-Land. The winner's purse is 150,000,000 Won.
- Riyuexing Cup was a title sponsored by Celestial NutriFoods.
- China-Korea Champions League was a league team tournament.

=== China-Taiwan ===
==== Team ====
- China-Taiwan Yayi Cup is a title sponsored by Yayi and the Taiwan Qiyuan.

=== Taiwan-USA ===
- Chai-chin Cup

=== Asia ===
==== Team ====
- Jeongganjang Cup is a title sponsored by Jeongganjang.

==== Defunct tournaments ====
- Bohae Cup
- Eastern Airlines Cup
- Women Go Contest

== South Korea ==
=== Open ===
Major

- GS Caltex Cup is a title sponsored by GS Caltex. The winner's purse is 50,000,000 won.
- Myeongin is a title sponsored by the SG Group. The winner's purse is 60,000,000 Won.

Minor

- Maxim Cup is a title sponsored by Baduk TV and Dong Suh Foods. The winner's purse is 15,000,000 Won.

Hayago

- Electron-Land Cup is a title sponsored by Korean Economic News, Baduk TV, and Cyber Kiwon. The winner's purse is 40,000,000 Won.
- KBS Cup is a title sponsored by KBS. The winner's purse is 20,000,000 Won.

Leagues

- Korean Baduk League is a league sponsored by Baduk TV.

==== Defunct tournaments ====
- Wangwi
- Baccus Cup
- Baedalwang
- Choegowi
- Gukgi
- Kiwang
- KT Cup
- KTF Cup
- LG Refined Oil Cup
- MBC TV Cup
- New Pros Strongest
- Paedal Cup
- Paewang
- SBS TV Cup
- Taewang
- The Kiseong was the Hanguk Kiwon equivalent to the Nihon-Kiin's Kisei competition and was sponsored by the Segye Ilbo (World Newspaper). The winner's purse was 18,000,000 SKW. The last title holder was Park Young-Hoon (2008).
- BC Card Cup was a title sponsored by Sports Korea and BC Card. The winner's purse is 20,000,000 Won.
- Guksu was a title sponsored by the Far East Daily News. The winner's purse was 40,000,000 Won.
- SK Gas Cup was a title sponsored by SK Gas. The winner's purse is 10,000,000 Won.
- Osram Cup was a title sponsored by Baduk TV.
- Ch'eongpung Cup was a title sponsored by Sungpu Air Purifiers.
- Yeongnam Ilbo Cup The winner's purse is 25,000,000 Won.
- Sibdan Cup is a title sponsored by the Wonik Corporation. The winner's prize is 25,000,000 Won.
- Prices Information Cup is a title sponsored by Korean Prices Information Foundation. The winner's purse is 22,000,000 Won.
- Chunwon is a title sponsored by Sports Korea. The winner's purse is 20,000,000 Won.

=== Women's ===
- Women's Guksu
- Female Myungin (1999–2016)
- Female Kisung

== People's Republic of China ==
=== Open ===
Major

- Qisheng (Kisei) is a title sponsored by the Zhongguo Qiyuan. It was held between 1999–2001 and is relaunched in 2013. The winner's purse is 800,000 CNY.
- Mingren (Meijin) is a title sponsored by the Zhongguo Qiyuan. The current winner's purse is 150,000 CNY.
- Tianyuan (Tengen) is a title sponsored by Zhongguo Qiyuan, New People's Evening News and New People's Weiqi Monthly Magazine. The current winner's purse is 400,000 CNY.
- Changqi Cup is a title sponsored by the Zhongguo Qiyuan. The winner's purse is 450,000 CNY.

Minor

- Quzhou-Lanke Cup is a tournament held every two years. The winner's purse is 500,000 CNY.
- Liguang Cup is a title sponsored by Ricoh. The winner's purse is 150,000 CNY.
- Longxing (Ryusei). The winner's purse is 150,000 CNY.
- Weifu Fangkai Cup. The winner's purse is 100,000 CNY.
- Xinren Wang (Shinjin-O) is a young players tournament for players under 30 and 7 dan. It is sponsored by Shanhai Qiyuan. The winner's purse is 40,000 CNY.
- National Go Individual

Hayago

- CCTV Cup is a title sponsored by the CCTV. It is renamed China Citic Bank Cup since 2012 due to the sponsor change. The current winner's purse is 200,000 CNY.
- Ahan Tongshan Cup (Agon Cup) is a title sponsored by Agon Shu. The winner's purse is 200,000 CNY.
- Xinan Wang is a title sponsored by Gyuqjing. The winner's purse is 50,000 CNY.

Leagues

- Chinese A League

==== Defunct tournaments ====
- NEC Cup
- Bawang
- All Chinese Championship
- Da Guo Shou
- Five Cows Cup
- Friendship Cup
- Lebaishi Cup
- Nanfang Cup
- NEC Xinxiu Cup
- New Sports Cup
- New Physical Education Cup
- Qiwang
- Top Ten Tournament
- Yongda Cup

=== Women's ===
- Female Weiqi Title is a title sponsored by Guodu.
- Xianye Cup is a title sponsored by Xianye.
- Bailing Cup is a title sponsored by Bailing Medicine Manufacturer.
- Women's Xinren Wang is a title sponsored by the Zhongguo Qiyuan.

== Taiwan ==
Major

- Tianyuan (Tengen) is a title sponsored by Minsheng Newspaper and the Taiwan Qiyuan.
- Wangzuo (Oza) is a title sponsored by the Taiwan Qiyuan.
- Guoshou (National Champion) is a title sponsored by the Taiwan Qiyuan.

Minor

- CMC TV Cup is a title sponsored by the Taiwan Qiyuan.
- Donggang Cup is a title sponsored by Donghe Gangtie and the Taiwan Qiyuan.
- Zhonghuan Cup is a title sponsored by the Taiwan Qiyuan.
- New Star Match is a title sponsored by the Taiwan Qiyuan.

== North America ==
- US Open
- North American Ing Masters is a title sponsored by the Ing Foundation.
- North American Redmond Cup is a title named for US-born Japanese pro Michael Redmond and funded by the Ing Foundation. It has two divisions, junior (12 or below) and senior (13 - 17).
- U.S.-Canada Team Tournament
- AGA Girls Cup is a title for young female players in the US, Canada, and Mexico, funded by American Go Foundation. It has two divisions, junior (12 or below) and senior (13 - 17) since 2025.

=== Defunct tournaments ===
- North American Masters Tournament

== Japan ==
=== Open ===
==== Major ====
Name	First held	Final	Winner's purse	Sponsor
Kisei	1977	Best of 7	43,000,000 yen	Yomiuri Shimbun
Meijin	1976	Best of 7	30,000,000 yen	Asahi Shimbun
Honinbo	1941	Best of 7	28,000,000 yen	Mainichi Shimbun
Oza	1953	Best of 5	14,000,000 yen	The Nikkei
Tengen	1975	Best of 5	12,000,000 yen	Three newspapers
Gosei	1976	Best of 5	8,000,000 yen	Various newspapers
Judan	1962	Best of 5	7,000,000 yen	Sankei Shimbun

==== Minor ====
- Shinjin-O is a title sponsored by the Akahata Newspaper. The winner's purse is 2,000,000 Yen.
- Okan is a title sponsored by the Chunichi Newspaper. The winner's purse is 1,700,000 Yen.
- Daiwa Cup is a title sponsored by Daiwa Securities Group. The winner's purse is 3,000,000 Yen.
- Kansai Ki-in Championship is a title sponsored by Sanyo Shimbun.

==== Hayago ====
- Agon Kiriyama Cup is a title sponsored by Agon Shu. The winner's purse is 10,000,000 Yen.
- NHK Cup is a title sponsored by NHK. The winner's purse is 5,000,000 Yen.
- Ryusei is a title sponsored by the Satellite Culture Japan. The winner's purse is 5,000,000 Yen.

==== Defunct tournaments ====
- Asahi Pro Best Ten
- Asahi Top Eight Players
- Asahi Top Position
- Chikurin
- Dai-ichi
- Hayago Championship
- Hayago Meijin
- Hosu
- IBM Cup
- Igo Masters Cup (2011–2019)
- Igo Senshuken
- JAL Super Hayago Championship
- JT Cup
- Kakusei
- Kirin Cup
- NEC Cup
- NEC Shun-Ei
- Nihon Ki-In Championship
- Old Meijin
- Phoenix Cup
- Prime Minister Cup
- Ryuen Cup
- Shin-Ei
- Tatsujin

=== Women's ===
==== Nihon Ki-in ====
- Women's Honinbo is a title sponsored by Kyodo News Agency. The winner's purse is 5,500,000 Yen.
- Women's Meijin is a title sponsored by Fuji Evening Newspaper. The winner's purse is 5,100,000 Yen.
- Women's Kisei is a title sponsored by NTT DoCoMo. The winner's purse is 5,000,000 Yen.
- Aizu Central Hospital Cup is a title sponsored by the Aidu Chuo Hospital Cup. The prize for winning is 7,000,000 Yen.
- Women's Saikyo was a title sponsored by Tokyo Seimitsu until 2008. It was resurrected in 2016 and is now known as the Senko Cup Female Saiko (or just Senko Cup). The prize for winning purse is 8,000,000 Yen.

==== Defunct tournaments ====
- Women's Nihon Ki-in Championship
- Women's Kakusei
- Women's JAL Super Hayago

==== Kansai Ki-in ====
- Kansai Lady's Tournament is a title sponsored by TV Osaka.

== See also ==
- European Go Cup
- Honorary Go titles
- Go players
- List of world Go champions
