= British Go Association =

The British Go Association (BGA) promotes and supports the playing of Go, the ancient Chinese strategy game, in the United Kingdom. The BGA was founded in 1953 and has a membership of about 450. It oversees tournaments, publishes the British Go Journal, and maintains a list of clubs.

== Attendance of British Go players at international tournaments ==
BGA is regularly sending players to international tournaments such as the World Amateur Go Championship and the European Go Championship. BGA is also working to make Go more popular among the youth, and students have been sent to the World Youth Go Championship in 2010 and 2011.

== See also ==
- International Go Federation
- European Go Federation
- American Go Association
- Irish Go Association - Held the 45th European Go Congress with BGA in 2001.

=== Go Associations in Former British Territories ===
- Australian Go Association
- Hong Kong Go Association
- New Zealand Go Society
- Singapore Weiqi Association
