= List of Go organizations =

List of Go organizations:

== International ==
- International Go Federation (IGF) (1982)

== Continental ==
In 2021:

- European Go Federation (2010) (EGF), for Europe
- Asian Go Federation (2015), for Asia
- Ibero-American Go Federation (Federación Iberoamericana de Go) (2009), for Ibero-America
- North American Go Federation (2020) (NAGF), for North America
- World Pair Go Association (2009), for World
- Ing Changk Wei-Chi Education Foundation (2012)
- Iwamoto North America Foundation for Go (2014)

== National ==
Country	Organization	IGF member since
Argentina	Asociación Argentina de Go	1982
Armenia	Armenian Draughts and Go Federation	2000
Australia	Australian Go Association	1982
Austria	Go Verband Österreich	1982
Azerbaijan	Azerbaijan GalaGAPI Federation (Azərbaycan Qalaqapı Federasiyası)	2005
Belarus	Belarusian Go Federation	2001
Belgium	Belgian Go Federation	1985
Bosnia and Herzegovina	Go Asocijacija Bosne i Hercegovine	2001
Brazil	Associação Brazil Nippon Kiin	1982
Brunei	Brunei Darussalam Go Association	2012
Bulgaria	Българска Го Асоциация	2005
Canada	Canadian Go Association	1982
Chile	Asociación Chilena de Go	1989
China	Chinese Weiqi Association	1982
Colombia	Asociación Colombiana de Go	1999
Costa Rica	Asociación Costarricense de Go	2006
Croatia	Hrvatska Igo Udruga	1997
Cuba	El Go en Cuba	1994
Cyprus	Kypriakos Syndesmos Go	2005
Czech Republic	Ceska Asociace Go	1982 (originally Czechoslovakia)
Denmark	Dansk Go Forbund	1982
Dominican Republic	Asociacion Dominicana de Go (RD-Go Federado)	2016
Ecuador	Asociación Ecuatoriana de Go	2001
Finland	Suomen Go-liitto ry	1982
France	French Go Federation	1982
(Georgia (country)) Georgia	Georgian Go Federation	2017
Germany	Deutscher Go-Bund	1982
Guatemala	Club de Igo de Guatemala, 6a Avenida A 8-35, Zona 9, Guatemala 01009	1999
Hong Kong (China)	Hong Kong Go Association	1982
Hungary	Magyar Gószövetség	1982
Iceland	Hið Íslenska Gofélag	2016
India	Association of Indian Go Players	1997 (national association changed in 2021)
Indonesia	Indonesia Go Organization	1994
Iran	Baduk Association of I.R of Iran	2015
(Republic of Ireland) Ireland	Irish Go Association	1990
Israel	אגודת הגו הישראלית	1997
Italy	Federazione Italiana Giuoco Go	1982
Italy	Associazione Goistica Italiana	non-member
Japan	Nihon Ki-in	1982
Kazakhstan	Kazakhstan Go Federation	2012
North Korea	The Baduk Association of DPR Korea P.O. Box; 800, Chukjon-dong, Mangyongdae dist, Pyongyang, DPR Korea Tel: 850-2-18111 (Ext 8677) Fax: 850-2-3814539	1991
South Korea	Korea Baduk Association	1982
Latvia	Latvijas Go Federacija	2012
Lithuania	Lietuvos Go Asociacija	2000
Luxembourg	Le Club de Go du Luxembourg	1985
Macau (China)	Clube De Xandrez "Wei Qi" De Macau	2008
Madagascar	Club de Go Madagascar	1999
Malaysia	Malaysia Weiqi Association	1987
Mexico	Asociación Mexicana de Go	1983
Mongolia	Mongolian Go Association, Box 470, Ulaanbaatar-38, Mongolia	2003
Morocco	Association pour la promotion du Go au Maroc BP2020 Hay Riad, Rabat, Maroc	1999
Nepal	Nepalese Go Association, Balakhu-10, Bhatapur, Nepal	2003
Netherlands	Nederlandse Go Bond	1982
New Zealand	New Zealand Go Society	1982
Norway	Norwegian Go Association	1982
Panama	Panamanian Go Association, Apdo.Postal 6–8312, El Dorado, Panama, República de Panamá	2003
Peru	Asociacion Peruana de Igo-Shogi, Centro Cultural Peruano, Japonés Av., Gregorio Escobedo 803, Lima 11, Peru	1999
Philippines	Philippine Go Association	2007
Poland	Polish Go Association	1982
Portugal	Portugal Go Association	1992
Romania	Romanian Go Association	1982
Russia	Russian Go Federation	1985 (orig. USSR)
Serbia	Go savez Srbije	1982 (orig. SFR Yugoslavia); 1997 (Reformed in FR Yugoslavia)
Singapore	Singapore Weiqi Association	1982
Slovakia	Slovenska Asociacia Go	1994
Slovenia	Go Zveza Slovenije	1992
South Africa	South African Go Association	1993
Spain	Asociación Española de Go	1982
Sweden	Svenska Goförbundet	1982
Switzerland	Swiss Go Association	1982
Taiwan	Taiwan Chi Yuan	1985
Thailand	Thai Go Association	1983
Tunisia	Tunisia Go Association	non-member
Turkey	Turkish Go Players Association	1993
Ukraine	Ukrainian Go Federation	1993
United Kingdom	British Go Association (BGA)	1982
United States	American Go Association (AGA)	1982
Uruguay	Federación Uruguaya de Go (FUGo)	2018 (desde 2001 como AUGo)
Venezuela	Asociaciόn Venezolana de Go	1992
Vietnam	Vietnam Go Association	1999

== See also ==
- List of professional Go tournaments
- List of Go players
- Kansai Ki-in
- All Japan Student Go Federation
