= U.S. Go Congress =

Annual go convention

The U.S. Go Congress is the largest annual Go event in the United States, held annually since 1985. It is organized by the American Go Association in conjunction with one or more local clubs, and is a week-long tournament and learning opportunity for Go players. Several hundred people generally attend, including a number of professional players. A few major tournaments are incorporated into the week, including the U.S. Open and the North American Masters (NAMT) tournament.

== U.S. Go Congresses and Winners ==
Year	Number	Location	Sponsoring Club	US Open winner	NAMT winner
1985	1st	Westminster, Maryland		Thomas Hsiang	
1986	2nd	Seattle, Washington		Ji Young Yoo	
1987	3rd	South Hadley, Massachusetts	Western MA Go Club	Chuang Zhuan Yu	
1988	4th	Berkeley, California		Hong Soo Shin	
1989	5th	New Brunswick, New Jersey		Paul Hu	
1990	6th	Loretto Heights, Colorado		Jung Ho Lim	
1991	7th	Rochester, New York	Empty Sky Go Club	Si Yeon Li	Charles Huh
1992	8th	Salem, Oregon		Woo Jin Kim	Dae Yol Kim
1993	9th	South Hadley, Massachusetts	Western MA Go Club	John Lee	Charles Huh
1994	10th	Washington, D.C.		Keun-Young Lee	John Lee
1995	11th	Seattle, Washington		Danning Jiang	Thomas Hsiang
1996	12th	Cleveland, Ohio		Danning Jiang	Jong Moon Lee
1997	13th	Lancaster, Pennsylvania		Thomas Hsiang	Keun Young Lee
1998	14th	Santa Fe, New Mexico		Jie Li	Jong Moon Lee
1999	15th	San Francisco, California		Danning Jiang	Jong Moon Lee
2000	16th	Denver, Colorado		Ted Ning	Thomas Hsiang
2001	17th	York, Pennsylvania	Baltimore Go Club	Yongfei Ge	Ke Huang
2002	18th	Chicago, Illinois		Jung Hoon Lee	Jie Li
2003	19th	Houston, Texas	Houston Go Club	Jie Li	Joey Hung
2004	20th	Rochester, New York	Empty Sky Go Club	Jie Li	Jie Li
2005	21st	Tacoma, Washington	Tacoma Go Club and Seattle Go Center	Xuefen Lin	Jie Li
2006	22nd	Black Mountain, North Carolina	Triangle Go Group	Andy Liu	Zhaonian (Michael) Chen
2007	23rd	Lancaster, Pennsylvania	Penn Go Society	Yongfei Ge	Mingjiu Jiang
2008	24th	Portland, Oregon	Portland Go Club	Myungwan Kim	Yun Feng
2009	25th	Washington, D.C.	NOVA Go Club	Myungwan Kim	Andy Liu
2010	26th	Colorado Springs, Colorado	Springs Go Club	Myungwan Kim	Huiren Yang
2011	27th	Santa Barbara, California	Orange County Go Club & LA Go Club	Yongfei Ge	Zi Yang Hu
2012	28th	Black Mountain, North Carolina	The Triangle Go Group	Zi Yang Hu	Zi Yang Hu
2013	29th	Tacoma, Washington	Tacoma Go Club and Seattle Go Center	Yuhan Zhang	Zi Yang Hu
2014	30th	New York, New York	Gotham Go Group	Mark Lee	
2015	31st	Twin Cities, Minnesota		Yulin Tong	
2016	32nd	Boston, Massachusetts	Massachusetts Go Association	Bao Yun	
2017	33rd	San Diego, California	San Diego Go Club	Wu Hao	
2018	34th	Williamsburg, Virginia	National Go Center	Tim Song	
2019	35th	Madison, Wisconsin	Madison Go Club	Frederick Bao	Eiko Nyu
2020	36th	Estes Park, Colorado	Cancelled because of COVID-19 pandemic. Held online.	Xinyu Tu	
2021	37th	Cleveland, Ohio	Cancelled because of COVID-19 pandemic. Held online.	Kbs8438	
2022	38th	Estes Park, Colorado		Tony Yang	Han Han
2023	39th	Kent, Ohio	Cleveland Go Club	Tony Yang	Han Han
2024	40th	Portland, Oregon	Portland Go Club	Zuhao Peng	Seonghoon On
2025	41st	Georgetown, Texas	Austin Go Club	Weibin Jin	Yuan-Jyun Wang
2026	42nd	Boston, Massachusetts	Massachusetts Go Association	Hyuk-Joon Kwon	
2027	43rd	Seattle, Washington			

== U.S. Open ==
The U.S. Open is a six-round Swiss-McMahon Go tournament with the longest time limits of any North American tournament. The Open is the largest Go tournament in North America. In 2006 and 2007, the tournament's top prize was $2,000.

Players are grouped by strength into different sections. These range from beginners (33kyu - 30kyu) to the advanced open section (7 dan and above).

Until 2014, High dan players (4 dan and above) received a base time of 120 minutes with 5 - 30 second byo-yomi periods. All other players received a base time of 90 minutes with 5 - 30 second byo-yomi periods. From 2014 thru 2024, all players in the U.S. Open received the same time of 90 minutes base time with 5 - 30 second byo-yomi periods. Starting in 2025, the AGA switched from byo-yomi to bonus time (also known as Fisher time). The 2025 setting for the U. S. Open (including the Masters) is 60 minutes basic time and 20 seconds increment.

Additionally, beginning in 2014, the open section of the U.S. Open (7 dan and above) was combined with the North American Ing Masters into a 9-round tournament with a top prize of $5,000. Players who were not 7 dan but had accumulated a sufficient number of qualifier points were also eligible to play in this section. Players who were 7 dan or above who did not wish to play in the North American Masters Tournament were allowed to play in the top section of the U.S. Open, which now combined 6 dan and 7 dan players, albeit with a lower amount of prize money at stake.

Year	Champion	Runner-up	Third place	Fourth Place	Fifth Place	Sixth Place
2023	Tony Yang					
2022	Tony Yang					
2013	Yuhan Zhang					
2012	Zi Yang Hu	Ge Liu	Zhiyuan (Andy) Liu	Pengwang Song	Curtis Tang	Beomgeun Cho
2011	Yongfei Ge	ZhaoNian Chen	Zi Yang Hu	Mingming Yin	Mengchen Zhang	Tianyu (Bill) Lin
2010	Myungwan Kim					
2009	Myungwan Kim					
2008	Myungwan Kim	Kuo Yin	Yongfei Ge	Bi Jang	Mingjiu Jiang	Eric Lui
2007	Yongfei Ge	Mingjiu Jiang	Guangjiong Chen	Zhaonian Chen	Eric Lui	Jie Liang
2006	Zhiyuan Liu (Andy)	Mingjiu Jiang	Seung Hyun Hong	Curtis Tang	Zhaonian Chen	Dal Soo Kim
2005	Xuefen Lin	Takahiro Kitagawa	Yongfei Ge	Haifeng Liu	Lu Wang (Jeffrey) & Zhaonian Chen	
2004	Jie Li	Lu Wang	Yongfei Ge	Xuefen Lin	Minshan Shou	Mozheng Guan

== North American Ing Masters ==
Year	Champion	One Loss
2013	Zi Yang Hu	Zhi Yuan (Andy) Liu, Mingming (Stephanie) Yin, Jie Liang, Tianyu (Bill) Lin
2012	Ziyang Hu	Zhiyuan (Andy) Liu, Yongfei Ge, Eric Lui, Curtis Tang
2011	Ziyang Hu	Mingjiu Jiang, Huiren Yang, Yongfei Ge, Curtis Tang
2010	Huiren Yang	Mingjiu Jiang, Yilun Yang, Yongfei Ge, Eric Lui, Juyong Koh
2009	Andy Liu	Yun Feng, Yilun Yang, Mingjiu Jiang, Jie Li, Yongfei Ge
2008	Yun Feng	Yilun Yang, Xuefen Lin, Zhaonian Chen, Juyong Koh, Thomas Hsiang

== North American Pair Go Championship ==
Year	Champion		runner-up		top four			
Year	Female Player	Male Player	Female Player	Male Player	Female Player	Male Player	Female Player	Male Player
1991	Debbie Siemon	Zhi-Li Peng						
1992	Judy Schwabe	Thomas Hsiang						
1993	Debbie Siemon	John Lee						
1994	Debbie Siemon	John Lee、						
1995	Lee Anne Bowie	James Chien						
1996	Debbie Siemon	Thomas Hsiang						
1997	Pauline Pohl	Ted Ning						
1998	Joanne Phipps	Ned Phipps						
1999	Louisa Chan	James Chien						
2000	Gina Shi	Joey Hung						
2001	Debbie Siemon	Thomas Hsiang						
2002	Wan Yu Chen	Ted Ning						
2003	Gina Shi	Mozheng Guan						
2004	Kristen Burrall	Yuan Zhou						
2005	Cherry Shen	Joey Hung						
2006	Wang Chen	Curtis Tang						
2007	Cherry Shen	Eric Lui						
2008	Yinli Wang (Audrey)	Edward (Edward) Zhang						
2009	Yinli Wang (Audrey)	Yuan Zhou						
2010	Wan Chen	Curtis Tang						
2011	Roxanne Tam	Yuan Zhou						
2012	Kelsey Dyer	Yuan Zhou						
2013	Amy Wang	Justin Ching						
2014	Yiwen Ye	Daehyuk Ko						
2015	Amy Wang	Daehyuk Ko						
2016	Gabriella Su	Jeremy Chiu						
2017	Gabriella Su	Justin Teng						
2018	Sophia Wang	Alan Huang						
2019	Tianyi (Tina) Li	Aaron Ye						
2022	Tianyi (Tina) Li	Albert Yen	Liya Luk	Edward Zhang	Samantha Soo	Jerry Ju	Paige Kimball	Jasper Emerton
2023	Liya Luk	Tianyuan Zhang	Jamie Tang	Albert Yen	Paige Lemaster	Jeremiah Donley	Annie Wagner	Edward Zhang
2024	Tianyi (Tina) Li	Tianyuan Zhang	Angel Zhou	Edward Zhang	Grace Pan	Alex Fan-Cui	Riannie Duan	Dash Zhang
2025	Yinli (Audrey) Wang	Zhiyuan (Edward) Zhang	Emily Xie	Harrison Dow	Samantha Mougette	Peter Armenia	Angel Zhou	Alex Fan-Cui

== See also ==
- Go at the 2010 Asian Games
- Go competitions
- International Go Federation
- List of Go organizations
- List of professional Go tournaments
