= Hong Kong Go Association =

- Traditional Chinese: 香港圍棋協會
- Simplified Chinese: 香港围棋协会
Transcriptions
Standard Mandarin
- Hanyu Pinyin: Xiānggǎng Wéiqí Xiéhuì
Yue: Cantonese
- Jyutping: hoeng1 gong2 wai4 kei4*2 hip3 wui6*2

The Hong Kong Go Association (abbreviated as HKGA, Chinese: 香港圍棋協會), created in 1982, is an organizational member of the International Go Federation. As of 2025, the chairman is Conrad Yu Chung Lok. It is dedicated to training and ranking Go players in Hong Kong.

== Activity Background ==
The Go player population in Hong Kong is not high as mainland China or Japan, but it is considered that Go is one of the most popular games in Hong Kong due to the following reasons:

1. Hong Kong has hosted the World Youth Go Championship in 1987.
2. Hong Kong has been sending representative players to international tournaments such as the World Amateur Go Championship every year (some Hong Kong players have ranked in to 2nd or 3rd place).

The Go players in Hong Kong have increased and getting stronger since the establishment of the HKGA, and it is recognized that HKGA has somewhat contributed to these advancements.

== See also ==
- International Go Federation
- List of professional Go tournaments
- China Qiyuan
- Taiwan Chi Yuan
- Singapore Weiqi Association
