= Singapore Weiqi Association =

- 新加坡围棋协会
- Logo of Singapore Weiqi Association
- Abbreviation: SWA
- Formation: 1981
- Founder: Dr. Chan Gin Hor
- Type: Sports governing body
- Purpose: Promotion of Go in Singapore
- Headquarters: 51 Bishan Street 13 #02-01; Singapore 579799
- Region served: Singapore
- Members: International Go Federation
- President: Lee Xinqiang, James
- Chief Coach: Yang Jinhua
- Website: weiqi.org.sg

The Singapore Weiqi Association (Chinese: 新加坡围棋协会; pinyin: Xīnjiāpō Wéiqí Xiéhuì), abbreviated as SWA, is a Go association and sports governing body in Singapore. Founded in 1981, it aims to promote the game of Go in Singapore and develop the skills of local Go players.

== History ==
The Singapore Weiqi Association was founded in 1981 by Dr. Chan Gin Hor, with activities initially taking place at the Ulu Pandan Community Center. In 1990, the association's clubhouse was moved to 116 Middle Road ICB Building. In 2000, the association was allocated a space in the Intellectual Game Center at Bishan, establishing two clubhouses.

During the late 1980s, the association successfully held several international tournaments and received visits from many Go Grand Masters from China, Japan, and Korea. The Weiqi population in Singapore increased from about 100 in 1981 to more than 20,000 by 2000.

For a number of years, the Singapore Weiqi Association received support from the Ing Foundation. In 1989 and 1999, Singapore hosted the World Youth Go Championship, which was notable at that period of time.

== Organization ==
=== Leadership ===
The current president is Lee Xinqiang, James, who leads the association's activities and development. The Chief Coach is Yang Jinhua, a former professional player from China who has played a pivotal role in nurturing talent since rejoining the association in March 2016. Dr. Chan Gin Hor serves as the Founder and Life-time Honorary President, having served as president for 20 years.

=== Facilities ===
Currently, the association operates clubhouses in Singapore, with the main location at 51 Bishan Street 13 #02-01, Singapore 579799. The association previously also maintained a clubhouse at 116 Middle Road.

== Activities ==
=== Training and education ===
A key activity of the Association is to provide Go training to the public. The association trains more than 3,000 students yearly at its clubhouses and at various schools. It supports Go training classes at about 20 local schools and institutions, including two universities and several top schools in Singapore. Most training classes are conducted by professional coaches from China hired by the association.

=== Ranking system ===
Amateur players in Singapore can have their rank assessed by the Singapore Weiqi Association. It awards rank certificates up to 6 dan.

=== Tournaments ===
The Association organizes more than ten tournaments per year, catering to different groups and skill levels. These include children and youth tournaments, ladies' and veterans' tournaments, and open single, pair, and group tournaments.

Recent tournaments organized by the association include:

- Six Trust Cup National Weiqi Championships
- Singapore Weiqi League
- National Ladies Tournament
- Whampoa Cup National Weiqi Championships
- National Pair Go Competition
- Singapore Dan Upgrading Competition
- Singapore Dan Certification Competition
- Shoutan Cup National Weiqi Competition

In 2025, the association held the 1st Nanyang Cup in February/March and the 9th International Collegiate Weiqi Competition in July.

=== International participation ===
For international exposure and networking, the association sends players to participate in international competitions such as the World Amateur Go Championship and World Youth Go Championship.

The association sends about 5 to 10 representatives to overseas tournaments each year.

=== Hosting international events ===
The Singapore Weiqi Association has successfully hosted several inter-country tournaments and organized visits from many Go professionals from China, Japan, and Korea. Notable events include:

- Hosted the Asian qualifying tournament for the Toyota/Denso Oza Championship
- Organized the Singapore, Malaysia, Thailand Weiqi Friendship Tournament in 2006
- Hosted the World Youth Go Championship in 1989 and 1999
- Hosted the 19th Yan Huang Cup in September 2017, with more than 200 delegates from China and Southeast Asia

== See also ==
- International Go Federation
- List of professional Go tournaments
- Zhongguo Qiyuan
- Taiwan Chi Yuan
- Hong Kong Go Association
