= Irish Go Association =

- Cumann Go na hÉireann
- Abbreviation: IGA
- Formation: 1989; 37 years ago
- Type: Voluntary association
- Region served: Ireland
- Affiliations: International Go Federation; European Go Federation
- Website: www.irish-go.org

The Irish Go Association (IGA) promotes Go in Ireland, and is a member of both the International Go Federation and the European Go Federation. It organises club and tournament events as well as teaching sessions.

In 2001 the IGA and British Go Association ran the 45th European Go Congress in Dublin, which was attended by around 400 players.

The IGA was founded in 1989, by the merging of two Dublin clubs - Trinity College and Collegians Chess and Go Club. The Association is cross-border, having affiliated clubs in Northern Ireland and the Republic. Its national championship has run every year since 1990.

== Championship finalists ==
Results are recorded by the Association.

Year	Winner	Runner up
1990	Noel Mitchell
1991	Noel Mitchell
1992	Noel Mitchell
1993	Noel Mitchell
1994	Noel Mitchell
1995	Stephen Flinter	Noel Mitchell
1996	Noel Mitchell	Stephen Flinter
1997	Noel Mitchell	Stephen Flinter
1998	Noel Mitchell	Stephen Flinter
1999	Noel Mitchell	Stephen Flinter
2000	Stephen Flinter	Noel Mitchell
2001	Noel Mitchell	Stephen Flinter
2002	Noel Mitchell	Stephen Flinter
2003	Noel Mitchell	Stephen Flinter
2004	Noel Mitchell	Stephen Flinter
2005	Noel Mitchell	Stephen Flinter
2006	Noel Mitchell	Stephen Flinter
2007	Ian Davis	Stephen Flinter
2008	Claas Roever	Noel Mitchell
2009	Ian Davis	Claas Roever
2010	Ian Davis	James Hutchinson
2011	James Hutchinson	Ian Davis
2012	Roman Pszonka	James Hutchinson
2013	Noel Mitchell	Roman Pszonka
2014	James Hutchinson	Roman Pszonka
2015	Philippe Renaut	James Hutchinson
2016	James Hutchinson	Noel Mitchell
2017	Philippe Renaut	Noel Mitchell
2018	James Hutchinson	Cian Synott
2019	Matei Garcia	James Hutchinson
2020	Matei Garcia	James Hutchinson
2021	Matei Garcia	James Hutchinson
2022	John Courtney	Alex Delogu
2023	Philippe Renaut	Lu Xinqun
2024	Philippe Renaut	Lu Xinqun
2025	Lu Xinqun	Larion Syrotkin
2026	Lu Xinqun	Dewei Liu

== See also ==
- List of Go organizations
- All-Ireland, other pan-Irish sports
