= Pandanet AGA City League =

American Go tournament

The AGA City League is an American Go Association (AGA) Go tournament in which teams from various cities compete against each other in a league system, on the Pandanet server in the "AGA City League" room.

The teams consist of up to five players, of whom three are selected to play in each round.

The current rules are listed on Pandanet.

== Winners of League A ==
Season	Year	Winner
1	2013	Los Angeles
2	2014	Vancouver
3	2015	Los Angeles
4	2016	Vancouver
5	2017	Vancouver
6	2018	New York City
7	2019	New York City
8	2020	New York City
9	2021	New York City
10	2022	Chicago
11	2023	Vancouver
12	2024	New York City
13	2025	New York City
14	2026	New York City

== The first AGA City League A in 2013 ==
The matches took place across 4 divisions (A to D), in the first half of 2013.

=== Round 1 ===
January 26, 2013

New York City	1 – 2	Los Angeles
Zhi Yuan (Andy) Liu	0-1	Beogmun Cho
Zhaonian Chen	1-0	Seung Hyun Hong
William Lockhart	0-1	Curtis Tang

Boston	1 – 2	Greater Washington
Huiren Yang	0-1	Jie Li
Jie Liang	0-1	Eric Lui
Yunzhe Zhang	1-0	Yuan Zhou

Vancouver, BC	2 – 1	Seattle 1
Zi Yang (Matthew) Hu	1-0	Dong Baek Kim
David Lu	0-1	Edward Kim
Tianyu (Bill) Lin	1-0	Ho Son

=== Round 2 ===
February 24, 2013

Los Angeles	2 – 1	Vancouver
Beogmun Cho	1-0	Zi Yang (Matthew) Hu
Daniel (Dae Hyuk) Ko	0-1	Tianyu (Bill) Lin
Curtis Tang	1-0	Qi Zheng

Boston	2 – 1	New York City
Huiren Yang	0-1	Zhi Yuan (Andy) Liu
Jie Liang	1-0	Zhaonian Chen
Yunzhe Zhang	1-0	William Lockhart

Greater Washington	2 – 1	Seattle 1
Daniel Chou	1-0	Dong Baek Kim
Eric Lui	1-0	Edward Kim
Yuan Zhou	0-1	Ho Son

=== Round 3 ===
March 17, 2013

Greater Washington	1 – 2	Los Angeles
Jie Li	0-1	Beogmun Cho
Eric Lui	1-0	Daniel (Dae Hyuk) Ko
Yuan Zhou	0-1	Curtis Tang

Seattle 1	1 – 2	Boston
Dong Baek Kim	0-1	Huiren Yang
Edward Kim	0-1	Jie Liang
Ho Son	1-0	Yunzhe Zhang

Vancouver	1 – 1	New York City
Zi Yang (Matthew) Hu	vs	Zhi Yuan (Andy) Liu
Tianyu (Bill) Lin	0-1	Zhaonian Chen
Qi Zheng	1-0	Yingzhi Qian

=== Round 4 ===
March 31, 2013

Los Angeles	1 – 2	Seattle 1
Beogmun Cho	1-0	Dong Baek Kim
Daniel (Dae Hyuk) Ko	0-1	Ho Son
Curtis Tang	0-1	Sung-Chui Cho

Boston	3 – 0	Vancouver, BC
Huiren Yang	1-0	Zi Yang (Matthew) Hu
Jie Liang	1-0	Tianyu (Bill) Lin
Yunzhe Zhang	1-0	David Lu

New York City	2 – 1	Greater Washington
Zhi Yuan (Andy) Liu	1-0	Daniel Chou
Zhaonian Chen	1-0	Eric Lui
William Lockhart	0-1	Yuan Zhou

=== Round 5 ===
April 28, 2013

Los Angeles	3 – 0	Boston
Beogmun Cho	1-0	Huiren Yang
Daniel (Dae Hyuk) Ko	1-0	Jie Liang
Curtis Tang	1-0	Yunzhe Zhang

Greater Washington	3 – 0	Vancouver, BC
Jie Li	1-0	Zi Yang (Matthew) Hu
Eric Lui	1-0	Tianyu (Bill) Lin
Yuan Zhou	1-0	Qi Zheng

Seattle 1	1 – 2	New York City
Dong Baek Kim	0-1	Zhi Yuan (Andy) Liu
Sung-Chui Cho	0-1	Zhaonian Chen
Ho Son	1-0	William Lockhart

=== Round 6 ===
May 12, 2013

Vancouver, BC	2 – 1	Los Angeles
Qi Zheng	0-1	Beogmun Cho
Tianyu (Bill) Lin	1-0	Seung Hyun Hong
David Lu	1-0	Curtis Tang

Boston	1 – 2	Seattle 1
Huiren Yang	1-0	Dong Baek Kim
Jie Liang	0-1	Edward Kim
Yunzhe Zhang	0-1	Ho Son

Greater Washington	3 – 0	New York City
Daniel Chou	1-0	Zhi Yuan (Andy) Liu
Eric Lui	1-0	Zhaonian Chen
Yuan Zhou	1-0	William Lockhart

=== Round 7 ===
May 26, 2013

Seattle 1	1 – 2	Los Angeles
Dong Baek Kim	0-1	Beogmun Cho
Edward Kim	0-1	Daniel (Dae Hyuk) Ko
Ho Son	1-0	Curtis Tang

New York City	2 – 1	Boston
Zhi Yuan (Andy) Liu	1-0	Huiren Yang
Zhaonian Chen	1-0	Jie Liang
Yingzhi Qian	0-1	Yunzhe Zhang

Vancouver, BC	2 – 1	Greater Washington
Qi Zheng	1-0	Daniel Chou
Tianyu (Bill) Lin	1-0	Eric Lui
David Lu	0-1	Yuan Zhou

=== Round 8 ===
June 16, 2013

Los Angeles	2 – 1	New York City
Beogmun Cho	1-0	Zhi Yuan (Andy) Liu
Daniel (Dae Hyuk) Ko	0-1	Zhaonian Chen
Curtis Tang	1-0	William Lockhart

Greater Washington	3 – 0	Boston
Jie Li	1-0	Huiren Yang
Eric Lui	1-0	Jie Liang
Yuan Zhou	1-0	Yunzhe Zhang

Seattle 1	1 – 2	Vancouver, BC
Dong Baek Kim	0-1	Qi Zheng
Edward Kim	0-1	Tianyu (Bill) Lin
Ho Son	1-0	David Lu

=== Round 9 ===
June 30, 2013

Greater Washington	1 – 2	Los Angeles
Daniel Chou	0-1	Beogmun Cho
Eric Lui	1-0	Daniel (Dae Hyuk) Ko
Yuan Zhou	0-1	Seung Hyun Hong

Vancouver, BC	0 – 3	Boston
Qi Zheng	0-1	Huiren Yang
Tianyu (Bill) Lin	0-1	Jie Liang
David Lu	0-1	Yunzhe Zhang

New York City	0 – 3	Seattle 1
Zhi Yuan (Andy) Liu	0-1	Dong Baek Kim
Zhaonian Chen	0-1	Edward Kim
William Lockhart	0-1	Ho Son

=== Round 10 ===
July 14, 2013

Boston	0 – 3	Los Angeles
Huiren Yang	0-1	Beogmun Cho
Jie Liang	0-1	Daniel (Dae Hyuk) Ko
Yunzhe Zhang	0-1	Seung Hyun Hong

Seattle 1	2 – 1	Greater Washington
Dong Baek Kim	0-1	Jie Li
Sung-Chui Cho	1-0	Eric Lui
Ho Son	1-0	Yuan Zhou

New York City	0 – 2	Vancouver, BC
Zhi Yuan (Andy) Liu	vs	Zi Yang (Matthew) Hu
Zhaonian Chen (zchen)	0-1	Tianyu (Bill) Lin
William Lockhart	0-1	David Lu

=== Final Rank ===
Team	Win	Lose	Game Win
Los Angeles	8	2	20
Vancouver, BC	5	4	12
Greater Washington	5	5	18
Seattle 1	4	6	15
Boston	4	6	13
New York City	3	6	10

== The Second AGA City League A in 2014 ==
The matches took place across 3 divisions (A to C), in the first half of 2014.

=== Round 1 ===
January 25, 2014

Los Angeles	1 – 2	Boston
Beogmun Cho	0-1	Huiren Yang
Seung Hyun Hong	0-1	Jie Liang
Andrew Lu	1-0	Yunzhe Zhang

Greater Washington	3 – 0	Toronto, ON
Eric Lui	1-0	Xiaofei Deng
Jie Li	1-0	Tiger Gong
Yuan Zhou	1-0	Sarah Yu

Canwa Vancouver	2 – 1	Seattle
Tianyu (Bill) Lin	0-1	Ximeng Yu
Juyong Koh	1-0	Ho Son
Ryan Li	1-0	Momoko Tsutsui

=== Round 2 ===
February 22, 2014

Los Angeles	1 – 2	Greater Washington
Beogmun Cho	0-1	Eric Lui
Seung Hyun Hong	0-1	Jie Li
Daniel (Dae Hyuk) Ko	1-0	Yuan Zhou

Canwa Vancouver	3 – 0	Boston
Tianyu (Bill) Lin	1-0	Huiren Yang
Juyong Koh	1-0	Jie Liang
Ryan Li	1-0	Yunzhe Zhang

Seattle	3 – 0	Toronto, ON
Ximeng Yu	1-0	Xiaofei Deng
Ho Son	1-0	Tiger Gong
Dong Baek Kim	1-0	Sarah Yu

=== Round 3 ===
March 29, 2014

Los Angeles	1 – 2	Seattle
Beogmun Cho	0-1	Ximeng Yu
Seung Hyun Hong	0-1	Ho Son
Daniel (Dae Hyuk) Ko	1-0	Dong Baek Kim

Toronto, ON	0 – 3	Canwa Vancouver
Xiaofei Deng	0-1	Tianyu (Bill) Lin
Tiger Gong	0-1	Juyong Koh
Sarah Yu	0-1	Ryan Li

Boston	1 – 2	Greater Washington
Huiren Yang	0-1	Eric Lui
Jie Liang	1-0	Jie Li
Yunzhe Zhang	0-1	Yuan Zhou

=== Round 4 ===
April 26, 2014

Los Angeles	3 – 0	Toronto, ON
Beogmun Cho	1-0	Xiaofei Deng
Seung Hyun Hong	1-0	Tiger Gong
Andrew Lu	1-0	Sarah Yu

Boston	1 – 2	Seattle
Huiren Yang	0-1	Ximeng Yu
Jie Liang	0-1	Ho Son
Yunzhe Zhang	1-0	Momoko Tsutsui

Greater Washington	1 – 2	Canwa Vancouver
Eric Lui	0-1	Tianyu (Bill) Lin
Jie Li	1-0	Juyong Koh
Yuan Zhou	0-1	Ryan Li

=== Round 5 ===
May 17, 2014

Los Angeles	0 – 2	Canwa Vancouver
Beogmun Cho	-	Tianyu (Bill) Lin
Seung Hyun Hong	0-1	Juyong Koh
Daniel (Dae Hyuk) Ko	0-1	Ryan Li

Seattle	2 – 1	Greater Washington
Ximeng Yu	1-0	Eric Lui
Ho Son	1-0	Jie Li
Momoko Tsutsui	0-1	Yuan Zhou

Toronto, ON	0 – 3	Boston
Xiaofei Deng	0-1	Huiren Yang
Tiger Gong	0-1	Jie Liang
Sarah Yu	0-1	Yunzhe Zhang

=== Final Rank ===
Team	Win	Lose	Rank
Canwa Vancouver	5	0	1
Seattle	4	1	2
Greater Washington	3	2	3
Boston	2	3	4
Los Angeles	1	4	5
Toronto, ON	0	5	6

== The Third AGA City League A in 2015 ==
The matches took place across 3 divisions (A to C), between November 23, 2014, and April 26, 2015.

=== Round 1 ===
November 23, 2014

Boston	2 – 1	Canwa Vancouver
Xianda Lan	1-0	Tianyu (Bill) Lin
Huiren Yang	0-1	Ryan Li
Jie Liang	1-0	Juyong Koh

San Francisco	1 – 2	Greater Washington
Hugh Zhang	0-1	Tim Zurui Song
Jeremy Chiu	0-1	Eric Lui
Matthew Burrall	1-0	Yuan Zhou

Seattle	0 – 3	Los Angeles
Ximeng Yu	0-1	Mark Lee
Ho Son	0-1	Beogmun Cho
Edward Kim	0-1	Daniel (Dae Hyuk) Ko

=== Round 2 ===
January 25, 2015

Boston	2 – 1	Los Angeles
Xianda Lan	1-0	Mark Lee
Huiren Yang	0-1	Beogmun Cho
Jie Liang	1-0	Daniel (Dae Hyuk) Ko

Greater Washington	3 – 0	Seattle
Tim Zurui Song	1-0	Ximeng Yu
Eric Lui	1-0	Ho Son
Jie Li	1-0	Edward Kim

Canwa Vancouver	3 – 0	San Francisco
Tianyu (Bill) Lin	1-0	Hugh Zhang
Ryan Li	1-0	Jeremy Chiu
Juyong Koh	1-0	Matthew Burrall

=== Round 3 ===
February 22, 2015

Boston	2 – 1	San Francisco
Xianda Lan	0-1	Hugh Zhang
Huiren Yang	1-0	Jeremy Chiu
Jie Liang	1-0	Matthew Burrall

Seattle	2 – 1	Canwa Vancouver
Ximeng Yu	1-0	Tianyu (Bill) Lin
Ho Son	1-0	Ryan Li
Edward Kim	0-1	Juyong Koh

Los Angeles	2 – 1	Greater Washington
Mark Lee	1-0	Tim Zurui Song
Beogmun Cho	1-0	Eric Lui
Daniel (Dae Hyuk) Ko	0-1	Jie Li

=== Round 4 ===
March 29, 2015

Boston	0 – 3	Greater Washington
Xianda Lan	0-1	Tim Zurui Song
Huiren Yang	0-1	Eric Lui
Jie Liang	0-1	Jie Li

Canwa Vancouver	0 – 3	Los Angeles
Tianyu (Bill) Lin	0-1	Mark Lee
Ryan Li	0-1	Beogmun Cho
Juyong Koh	0-1	Daniel (Dae Hyuk) Ko

San Francisco	0 – 3	Seattle
Matthew Burrall	0-1	Ximeng Yu
Jeremy Chiu	0-1	Ho Son
Louis Abronson	0-1	Edward Kim

=== Round 5 ===
April 26, 2015

Boston	2 – 1	Seattle
Xianda Lan	1-0	Ximeng Yu
Huiren Yang	1-0	Ho Son
Jie Liang	0-1	Peter Nelson

Los Angeles	3 – 0	San Francisco
Mark Lee	1-0	Hugh Zhang
Beogmun Cho	1-0	Jeremy Chiu
Daniel (Dae Hyuk) Ko	1-0	Matthew Burrall

Greater Washington	3 – 0	Canwa Vancouver
Tim Zurui Song	1-0	Tianyu (Bill) Lin
Eric Lui	1-0	Ryan Li
Jie Li	1-0	Michael Ma

=== Final Rank ===
Team	Win	Lose	Game Win	Game Lose
Los Angeles	4	1	12	3
Greater Washington	4	1	12	3
Boston	4	1	8	7
Seattle 1	2	3	6	9
Canwa Vancouver 1	1	4	5	10
San Francisco 1	0	5	2	13

== The Fourth AGA City League A in 2016 ==
The matches took place across 3 divisions (A to C), between October 18, 2015, and May 22, 2016.

=== Round 1 ===
October 18, 2015

Vancouver, BC	3 – 0	Princeton
W Hanchen Zhang 1 dan pro	W+Resign	B Zhaonian Chen 8 dan
B Ryan Li 7 dan	B+Resign	W Ricky Zhao 7 dan
W Tianyu (Bill) Lin 7 dan	W+Forfeit	B Andrew Huang 7 dan

Seattle 1	2 – 0	Vancouver 2
B Ho Son 7 dan	B+Resign	W David Lu 6 dan
B Edward Kim 7 dan	vs	W Yan Song Zhu 6 dan
W Peter Nelson 5 dan	W+Resign	B Roy Tong 5 dan

Greater Washington	2½ – ½	Bay Area
W Tim Zurui Song 1 dan pro	W+Resign	B Xiaotian Hu 7 dan
B Eric Lui 8 dan	B+5.5	W Qucheng Gong 8 dan
W Yuan Zhou 7 dan	Jigo	B Aaron Ye 7 dan

Boston	3 – 0	Los Angeles
W Xianda Lan 6 dan	W+Forfeit	B Beogmun Cho 9 dan
B Jie Liang 8 dan	B+Resign	W Daniel (Dae Hyuk) Ko 8 dan
W Huiren Yang 1 dan pro	W+Forfeit	B Seung Hyun Hong 7 dan

=== Round 2 ===
November 15, 2015

Vancouver 2	0 – 2	Vancouver, BC
W David Lu	B+Resign	B Hanchen Zhang
B Yan Song Zhu	vs	W Ryan Li
W Roy Tong	B+Resign	B Tianyu (Bill) Lin

Princeton	2 – 1	Bay Area
W Zhaonian Chen	W+8.5	B Qucheng Gong
B Ricky Zhao	B+Forfeit	W Xiaotian Hu
W Andrew Huang	B+Resign	B Aaron Ye

Seattle 1	0 – 3	Los Angeles
W Ho Son	B+6.5	B Beogmun Cho
B Edward Kim	W+Resign	W Daniel (Dae Hyuk) Ko
W Peter Nelson	B+Resign	B Seung Hyun Hong

Greater Washington	3 – 0	Boston
W Tim Zurui Song	W+Forfeit	B Xianda Lan
B Eric Lui	B+13.5	W Jie Liang
W Mengchen Zhang	W+Resign	B Huiren Yang

=== Round 3 ===
January 24, 2016

Vancouver, BC	2 – 1	Bay Area
W Hanchen Zhang	W+Resign	B Qucheng Gong
B Ryan Li	W+0.5	W Xiaotian Hu
W Tianyu (Bill) Lin	W+Resign	B Aaron Ye

Vancouver 2	0 – 3	Los Angeles
W David Lu	B+Resign	B Mark Lee
B Melissa Zhang	W+Resign	W Seung Hyun Hong
W Roy Tong	B+24.5	B Daniel (Dae Hyuk) Ko

Princeton	1 – 2	Boston
W Zhaonian Chen	B+Resign	B Xianda Lan
B Ricky Zhao	B+15.5	W Jie Liang
W Andrew Huang	B+13.5	B Huiren Yang

Seattle 1	0 – 3	Greater Washington
W Ho Son	B+Resign	B Tim Zurui Song
B Edward Kim	W+Resign	W Eric Lui
W Sung-Chui Cho	B+Resign	B Mengchen Zhang

=== Round 4 ===
February 21, 2016

Los Angeles	2 – 1	Vancouver, BC
W Mark Lee	W+Resign	B Hanchen Zhang
B Beogmun Cho	B+1.5	W Ryan Li
W Daniel (Dae Hyuk) Ko	B+Time	B Tianyu (Bill) Lin

Bay Area	2 – 1	Boston
W Qucheng Gong	W+Forfeit	B Xianda Lan
B Xiaotian Hu	B+Resign	W Jie Liang
W Aaron Ye	B+Resign	B Huiren Yang

Vancouver 2	0 – 3	Greater Washington
W David Lu	B+Resign	B Tim Zurui Song
B Melissa Zhang	W+Resign	W Eric Lui
W Roy Tong	B+Resign	B Mengchen Zhang

Princeton	1 – 2	Seattle 1
W Zhaonian Chen	W+7.5	B Ho Son
B Ricky Zhao	W+Time	W Edward Kim
W Andrew Huang	B+Forfeit	B Peter Nelson

=== Round 5 ===
March 20, 2016

Vancouver, BC	3 – 0	Boston
W Hanchen Zhang	W+6.5	B Jue Wang
B Ryan Li	B+Resign	W Jie Liang
W Tianyu (Bill) Lin	W+0.5	B Huiren Yang

Los Angeles	1 – 2	Greater Washington
W Mark Lee	W+Resign	B Tim Zurui Song
B Beogmun Cho	W+Resign	W Eric Lui
W Daniel (Dae Hyuk) Ko	B+13.5	B Mengchen Zhang

Bay Area	2 – 1	Seattle 1
W Qucheng Gong	B+Resign	B Ho Son
W Xiaotian Hu	W+Resign	B Edward Kim
W Aaron Ye	W+Resign	B Peter Nelson

Vancouver 2	0 – 3	Princeton
W David Lu	B+18.5	B Zhaonian Chen
B Melissa Zhang	W+Resign	W Ricky Zhao
W Roy Tong	B+Resign	B Andrew Huang

=== Round 6 ===
April 17, 2016

Greater Washington	0 – 3	Vancouver, BC
W Tim Zurui Song	B+Time	B Hanchen Zhang
B Eric Lui	W+Resign	W Ryan Li
W Mengchen Zhang	B+Resign	B Tianyu (Bill) Lin

Boston	2 – 1	Seattle 1
W Jue Wang	B+Time	B Ho Son
B Jie Liang	B+Resign	W Edward Kim
W Huiren Yang	W+0.5	B Sung-Chui Cho

Los Angeles	2 – 1	Princeton
W Mark Lee	W+Resign	B Zhaonian Chen
B Beogmun Cho	B+Resign	W Ricky Zhao
W Daniel (Dae Hyuk) Ko	B+Time	B Andrew Huang

Bay Area	2 – 0	Vancouver 2
W Qucheng Gong	W+Resign	B David Lu
B Xiaotian Hu	vs	W Melissa Zhang
W Aaron Ye	W+Resign	B Roy Tong

=== Round 7 ===
May 22, 2016

Vancouver, BC	3 – 0	Seattle 1
B Hanchen Zhang	B+Resign	W Ho Son
B Ryan Li	B+Resign	W Edward Kim
W Tianyu (Bill) Lin	W+Resign	B Peter Nelson

Greater Washington	2 – 1	Princeton
W Tim Zurui Song	B+3.5	B Zhaonian Chen
B Eric Lui	B+Resign	W Ricky Zhao
W Mengchen Zhang	W+Forfeit	B Andrew Huang

Boston	3 – 0	Vancouver 2
W Jue Wang	W+Resign	B David Lu
B Jie Liang	B+Resign	W Melissa Zhang
W Huiren Yang	W+Resign	B Roy Tong

Los Angeles	2 – 1	Bay Area
B Mark Lee	B+Resign	W Qucheng Gong
B Beogmun Cho	W+Resign	W Xiaotian Hu
W Daniel (Dae Hyuk) Ko	W+Resign	B Aaron Ye

=== Rank ===
Team	Win	Lose	Game Win	Game Lose
Vancouver, BC	6	1	16	3
Greater Washington	6	1	15.5	5.5
Los Angeles	5	2	13	8
Boston	4	3	11	10
Bay Area	3	4	9.5	10.5
Princeton	2	5	9	12
Seattle 1	2	5	6	13
Vancouver 2	0	7	0	18

== The Fifth AGA City League A in 2017 ==
The matches took place across 4 divisions (A to D), between November 13, 2016, and May 21, 2017.

=== Roster ===
Team	Captain	Players
Canwa Vancouver 1	Cathy (Chen Shuo) Li	Zi Yang (Matthew) Hu, Ryan Li, Tianyu (Bill) Lin, Juyong Koh
Seattle 1	Michael Cho	Ho Son, Yue Zhang, Edward Kim, Xinlei (Alex) Liu, Peter Nelson
Edmonton	Wei Cheng	Frank Wang, Wei Cheng, Junliang Zhang, Martin Müller, Elvis Sun
New Jersey	Candice Ching	Yansong (George) Zhou, Justin Ching, Willis Huang, Kevin Huang
Greater Washington	I-Han Lui	Tim Zirui Song, Eric Lui, Mengchen Zhang, Yuan Zhou
Boston	Ke Lu	Xianda Lan, Jie Liang, Huiren Yang, Jue Wang
Washington DC 2	Liang Yu	Siyuan Li, Lin Lu, Zhenying Gu, Zhiyuan (Edward) Zhang
Bay Area	Abby Zhang	Qucheng Gong, Xiaotian Hu, Aaron Ye

=== Round 1 ===
November 13, 2016

Canwa Vancouver 1	2.5–0.5	Seattle 1
B Zi Yang (Matthew) Hu	B+Resign	W Ho Son
W Ryan Li	W+Time	B Yue Zhang
B Tianyu (Bill) Lin	jigo	W Edward Kim

Edmonton	3-0	New Jersey
B Frank Wang	B+Forfeit	W Yansong (George) Zhou
W Wei Cheng	W+Resign	B Justin Ching
B Junliang Zhang	B+3.5	W Willis Huang

Greater Washington	2–1	Boston
B Tim Zurui Song	W+Resign	W Xianda Lan
W Eric Lui	W+Resign	B Jie Liang
B Mengchen Zhang	B+7.5	W Huiren Yang

Washington DC 2	1–2	Bay Area
B Siyuan Li	B+Resign	W Qucheng Gong
B Zhiyuan (Edward) Zhang	W+12.5	W Xiaotian Hu
B Zhenying Gu	W+Resign	W Aaron Ye

=== Round 2 ===
December 4, 2016

Canwa Vancouver 1	3 – 0	Edmonton
W Zi Yang (Matthew) Hu	W+Resign	B Frank Wang
W Ryan Li	W+Resign	B Elvis Sun
B Tianyu (Bill) Lin	B+Resign	W Junliang Zhang

Greater Washington	3 – 0	Seattle 1
B Tim Zurui Song	B+0.5	W Ho Son
W Eric Lui	W+Resign	B Yue Zhang
B Mengchen Zhang	B+Resign	W Edward Kim

Washington DC 2	1 – 2	New Jersey
B Siyuan Li	B+Resign	W Yansong (George) Zhou
W Lin Lu	B+Forfeit	B Justin Ching
B Liang Yu	W+Resign	W Willis Huang

Bay Area	2 – 1	Boston
B Qucheng Gong	W+31.5	W Xianda Lan
W Xiaotian Hu	W+Resign	B Jie Liang
B Aaron Ye	B+Resign	W Huiren Yang

=== Round 3 ===
January 22, 2017

Canwa Vancouver 1	3 – 0	Bay Area
B Zi Yang (Matthew) Hu	B+Resign	W Qucheng Gong
W Ryan Li	W+Forfeit	B Xiaotian Hu
B Tianyu (Bill) Lin	B+Resign	W Aaron Ye

Boston	2 – 1	Washington DC 2
B Xianda Lan	W+Resign	W Siyuan Li
W Jie Liang	W+Time	B Lin Lu
B Huiren Yang	B+Resign	W Liang Yu

New Jersey	0 – 3	Greater Washington
B Kevin Huang	W+Resign	W Tim Zurui Song
W Justin Ching	B+Resign	B Eric Lui
B Willis Huang	W+16.5	W Mengchen Zhang

Seattle 1	3 – 0	Edmonton
B Ho Son	B+Resign	W Frank Wang
W Yue Zhang	W+20.5	B Wei Cheng
B Edward Kim	B+2.5	W Junliang Zhang

=== Round 4 ===
February 19, 2017

Canwa Vancouver 1	2 - 1	Washington DC 2
B Zi Yang (Matthew) Hu	B+8.5	W Siyuan Li
W Ryan Li	W+20.5	B Liang Yu
B Tianyu (Bill) Lin	W+Forfeit	W Zhiyuan (Edward) Zhang

Bay Area	0 - 3	Greater Washington
B Qucheng Gong	W+Resign	W Tim Zirui Song
W Xiaotian Hu	B+Resign	B Eric Lui
B Aaron Ye	W+Forfeit	W Mengchen Zhang

Boston	2 – 1	Edmonton
B Xianda Lan	B+Resign	W Frank Wang
W Jie Liang	W+Time	B Wei Cheng
B Huiren Yang	W+8.5	W Elvis Sun

New Jersey	2 – 1	Seattle 1
B Kevin Huang	B+2.5	W Ho Son
W Justin Ching	B+Resign	B Yue Zhang
B Willis Huang	B+Resign	W Peter Nelson

=== Round 5 ===
March 19, 2017

Canwa Vancouver 1	2 - 1	Greater Washington
W Zi Yang (Matthew) Hu	W+4.5	B Tim Zurui Song
W Ryan Li	W+Resign	B Eric Lui
B Tianyu (Bill) Lin	W+Forfeit	W Mengchen Zhang

Washington DC 2	1 - 1	Edmonton
B Siyuan Li	B+5.5	W Frank Wang
W Liang Yu	vs	B Elvis Sun
B Zhiyuan (Edward) Zhang	W+16.5	W Junliang Zhang

Bay Area	1 - 2	Seattle 1
B Qucheng Gong	W+Time	W Ho Son
W Xiaotian Hu	B+Resign	B Yue Zhang
B Aaron Ye	B+Resign	W Edward Kim

Boston	3 - 0	New Jersey
B Xianda Lan	B+Resign	W Yansong (George) Zhou
W Jie Liang	W+Resign	B Justin Ching
B Huiren Yang	B+Resign	W Willis Huang

=== Round 6 ===
April 23, 2017

Canwa Vancouver 1	3 – 0	Boston
B Zi Yang (Matthew) Hu	B+Time	W Xianda Lan
W Ryan Li	W+Resign	Jie Liang
B Tianyu (Bill) Lin	B+1.5	W Huiren Yang

New Jersey	2 – 1	Bay Area
B Yansong (George) Zhou	W+Forfeit	W Qucheng Gong
W Justin Ching	W+Resign	B Xiaotian Hu
B Kevin Huang	B+Resign	W Aaron Ye

Seattle 1	3 – 0	Washington DC 2
B Ho Son	B+Forfeit	W Siyuan Li
W Yue Zhang	W+Forfeit	B Liang Yu
B Edward Kim	B+Forfeit	W Zhenying Gu

Edmonton	0 – 3	Greater Washington
B Frank Wang	W+Resign	W Tim Zurui Song
W Wei Cheng	B+Resign	B Eric Lui
B Junliang Zhang	W+Resign	W Mengchen Zhang

=== Round 7 ===
May 21, 2017

Canwa Vancouver 1	3 – 0	New Jersey
B Zi Yang (Matthew) Hu	B+Resign	W Kevin Huang
W Ryan Li	W+Resign	B Justin Ching
B Tianyu (Bill) Lin	B+Resign	W Willis Huang

Seattle 1	1 – 2	Boston
B Ho Son	W+17.5	W Jue Wang
W Yue Zhang	B+Time	B Jie Liang
B Xinlei (Alex) Liu	B+1.5	W Huiren Yang

Edmonton	2 – 0	Bay Area
B Frank Wang	vs	W Qucheng Gong
W Wei Cheng	W+Forfeit	B Xiaotian Hu
B Junliang Zhang	B+Resign	W Wei Cheng

Greater Washington	3 – 0	Washington DC 2
B Tim Zurui Song	B+Time	W Zhiyuan (Edward) Zhang
W Eric Lui	W+Resign	B Liang Yu
B Mengchen Zhang	B+Forfeit	W Zhenying Gu

=== Rank ===
Rank	Team	Win	Draw	Lose
1	Canwa Vancouver 1	7	0	0
2	Greater Washington	6	0	1
3	Boston	4	0	3
4	Seattle 1	3	0	4
5	Bay Area	3	0	4
6	Edmonton	2	1	4
7	New Jersey	2	0	5
8	Washington DC 2	0	1	6

== The Sixth AGA City League A in 2018 ==
AGA City League 2018 is played between December 10, 2017, and June 10, 2018.

=== Roster ===
Team	Captain	Players
New Jersey	Candice Ching	Alan Huang, Justin Ching, Willis Huang, Kevin Huang
Boston	Ke Lu	Jie Liang, Huiren Yang, Sheng Xu, Henry Li, Ke Lu
Canwa Vancouver 1	Cathy (Chen Shuo) Li	Zi Yang (Matthew) Hu, Tianyu (Bill) Lin, Brady Zhang, Juyong Koh
Greater Washington	I-Han Lui	Tim Zurui Song, Eric Lui, Mengchen Zhang, Yuan Zhou
Seattle 1	Sung-Chui Cho	Yue Zhang, Ho Son, Kai Fugami, Xinlei (Alex) Liu, Peter Nelson
Edmonton	Wei Cheng	Elvis Sun, Dezheng Kong, Junliang Zhang, Frank Wang, Wei Cheng
New York City	Stephanie Yin	Ryan Li, Hanchen Zhang, Stephanie Yin, Zhi Yuan (Andy) Liu, Yuxuan Yang

=== Round 1 ===
December 10, 2017

New Jersey	2–1	Boston
B Alan Huang	B+Resign	W Jie Liang
W Justin Ching	B+Resign	B Huiren Yang
B Willis Huang	B+Resign	W Sheng Xu

Canwa Vancouver 1	2-1	Greater Washington
B Zi Yang (Matthew) Hu	B+Resign	W Tim Zurui Song
W Tianyu (Bill) Lin	B+Resign	B Eric Lui
B Brady Zhang	B+Resign	W Mengchen Zhang

Seattle 1	1–2	Edmonton
W Yue Zhang	B+Time	B Elvis Sun
W Ho Son	W+Forfeit	B Dezheng Kong
B Kai Fugami	W+Forfeit	W Junliang Zhang

=== Round 2 ===
January 21, 2018

New York City	1–2	Greater Washington
B Ryan Li	W+8.5	W Tim Zurui Song
W Hanchen Zhang	B+Resign	B Eric Lui
B Stephanie Yin	B+Resign	W Mengchen Zhang

Boston	1–2	Edmonton
B Jie Liang	W+Resign	W Elvis Sun
W Huiren Yang	W+Resign	B Dezheng Kong
B Henry Li	W+Resign	W Junliang Zhang

New Jersey	0–3	Canwa Vancouver 1
B Alan Huang	W+Resign	W Zi Yang (Matthew) Hu
W Justin Ching	B+Resign	B Tianyu (Bill) Lin
B Willis Huang	W+Resign	W Brady Zhang

=== Round 3 ===
February 18, 2018

New York City	2–1	New Jersey
B Ryan Li	W+Resign	W Alan Huang
W Hanchen Zhang	W+Resign	B Justin Ching
B Stephanie Yin	B+Resign	W Willis Huang

Seattle 1	1-2	Boston
B Yue Zhang	W+Resign	W Jie Liang
W Ho Son	B+Resign	B Huiren Yang
B Kai Fugami	B+Resign	W Sheng Xu

Edmonton	0–3	Greater Washington
B Frank Wang	W+Resign	W Tim Zurui Song
W Dezheng Kong	B+Resign	B Eric Lui
B Wei Cheng	W+Resign	W Mengchen Zhang

=== Round 4 ===
March 18, 2018

New York City	3–0	Canwa Vancouver 1
B Ryan Li	B+Resign	W Zi Yang (Matthew) Hu
W Hanchen Zhang	W+Resign	B Tianyu (Bill) Lin
B Stephanie Yin	B+Resign	W Brady Zhang

Seattle 1	2–1	New Jersey
B Yue Zhang	W+Time	W Alan Huang
W Ho Son	W+Resign	B Justin Ching
B Kai Fugami	B+Forfeit	W Willis Huang

Greater Washington	2½–½	Boston
B Tim Zurui Song	B+Resign	W Jie Liang
W Eric Lui	Tie	B Huiren Yang
B Mengchen Zhang	B+Resign	W Sheng Xu

=== Round 5 ===
April 22, 2018

New York City	2–1	Boston
B Ryan Li	W+Forfeit	W Jie Liang
W Hanchen Zhang	W+Resign	B Huiren Yang
B Stephanie Yin	B+Time	W Sheng Xu

New Jersey	3–0	Edmonton
B Alan Huang	B+Resign	W Elvis Sun
W Kevin Huang	W+Resign	B Dezheng Kong
B Willis Huang	B+Resign	W Junliang Zhang

Canwa Vancouver 1	3 – 0	Seattle 1
B Zi Yang (Matthew) Hu	B+Forfeit	W Yue Zhang
B Tianyu (Bill) Lin	B+Resign	W Ho Son
B Brady Zhang	B+8.5	W Kai Fugami

=== Round 6 ===
May 20, 2018

New York City	3 – 0	Edmonton
B Ryan Li	B+Resign	W Wei Cheng
W Hanchen Zhang	W+Time	B Dezheng Kong
B Stephanie Yin	B+Resign	W Junliang Zhang

Greater Washington	3 – 0	Seattle 1
B Tim Zurui Song	B+Time	W Yue Zhang
W Eric Lui	W+0.5	B Ho Son
B Mengchen Zhang	B+Resign	W Kai Fugami

Boston	0 – 3	Canwa Vancouver 1
B Jie Liang	W+10.5	W Zi Yang (Matthew) Hu
W Huiren Yang	B+Resign	B Tianyu (Bill) Lin
B Sheng Xu	W+Resign	W Brady Zhang

=== Round 7 ===
June 10, 2018

New York City	3 – 0	Seattle 1
B Ryan Li	B+Resign	W Yue Zhang
W Hanchen Zhang	W+Resign	B Ho Son
B Stephanie Yin	B+Resign	W Kai Fugami

Edmonton	1 – 2	Canwa Vancouver 1
B Elvis Sun	B+8.5	W Zi Yang (Matthew) Hu
W Frank Wang	B+Time	B Tianyu (Bill) Lin
B Junliang Zhang	W+Resign	W Brady Zhang

Greater Washington	2½ – ½	New Jersey
B Tim Zurui Song	Jigo	W Alan Huang
W Eric Lui	W+Resign	B Justin Ching
B Mengchen Zhang	B+Resign	W Willis Huang

=== Scoreboard ===
Team	Win	Loss	Game win	Game loss
New York City	5	1	14	4
Greater Washington	5	1	14	4
Canwa Vancouver 1	5	1	13	5
New Jersey	3	3	9.5	8.5
Edmonton	2	4	5	13
Boston	1	5	5.5	12.5
Seattle 1	1	5	4	14

=== Final ===
July 21, 2018. Williamsburg, VA

New York City	3-0	Greater Washington
Ryan Li 1p (W)	W+	Tim Song 1p (B)
Andy Liu 1p (B)	B+	Eric Lui 1p (W)
Stephanie Yin 1p (B)	B+	Yuan Zhou 7d (W)

== The Seventh AGA City League A in 2019 ==
AGA City League 2019 was played between November 18, 2018, and May 19, 2019.

=== Roster ===
Team	Captain	Players
New Jersey	Candice Ching	Alan Huang, Willis Huang, Justin Ching, Kevin Huang
Toronto, ON	Howard Wong	Qiyou Wu, Tony Zhao, Tianyi Chen, Edwin Yoon, James Sedgwick
Boston	Ke Lu	Bin (Chase) Fu, Zhongfan Jian, Jie Liang, Huiren Yang, Sheng Xu
New York City	Stephanie Yin	Ryan Li, Hanchen Zhang, Stephanie Yin, Zhi Yuan (Andy) Liu, Yuxuan Yang
Greater Washington	I-Han Lui	Tim Zurui Song, Eric Lui, Mengchen Zhang, Yuan Zhou
Ottawa	Yingzhi Chen	Guanyu Song, Jun Li, Hanxi Zhang, Xianyu Li, Yingzhi Chen
Canwa Vancouver 1	Cathy (Chen Shuo) Li	Zi Yang (Matthew) Hu, Tianyu (Bill) Lin, Brady Zhang, Juyong Koh
Waterloo 1	Quan Sun	Wei Qiu, Quan Sun, Xijin Dong, Junliang Zhang

=== Round 1 ===
November 18, 2018

New Jersey	0–3	Toronto, ON
B Alan Huang	W+Resign	W James Sedgwick
W Willis Huang	B+Resign	B Tony Zhao
W Justin Ching	B+Resign	B Tianyi Chen

Boston	0–3	New York City
B Huiren Yang	W+15.5	W Ryan Li
W Zhongfan Jian	B+Resign	B Hanchen Zhang
B Jie Liang	W+Resign	W Stephanie Yin

Greater Washington	3–0	Ottawa
B Tim Zurui Song	B+Resign	W Guanyu Song
W Eric Lui	W+Resign	B Jun Li
B Mengchen Zhang	B+Resign	W Xianyu Li

Canwa Vancouver 1	1–2	Waterloo 1
B Zi Yang (Matthew) Hu	W+2.5	W Wei Qiu
W Tianyu (Bill) Lin	W+Resign	B Quan Sun
B Brady Zhang	W+14.5	W Xijin Dong

=== Round 2 ===
December 9, 2018

New Jersey	0–3	Ottawa
B Kevin Huang	W+Resign	W Guanyu Song
W Willis Huang	B+Resign	B Jun Li
B Justin Ching	W+Resign	W Xianyu Li

New York City	3–0	Waterloo 1
B Ryan Li	B+Resign	W Junliang Zhang
W Hanchen Zhang	W+Resign	B Quan Sun
B Stephanie Yin	B+Resign	W Xijin Dong

Toronto, ON	2–1	Canwa Vancouver 1
B Qiyou Wu	B+Resign	W Zi Yang (Matthew) Hu
W Tony Zhao	B+Resign	B Tianyu (Bill) Lin
B Edwin Yoon	B+30.5	W Brady Zhang

Boston	1–2	Greater Washington
B Huiren Yang	W+Resign	W Tim Zurui Song
W Zhongfan Jian	W+Resign	B Eric Lui
B Jie Liang	W+Resign	W Mengchen Zhang

=== Round 3 ===
January 20, 2019

New Jersey	0–3	Boston
B Alan Huang	W+29.5	W Zhongfan Jian
W Willis Huang	B+5.5	B Jie Liang
B Justin Ching	W+Resign	W Sheng Xu

Greater Washington	3–0	Toronto, ON
B Tim Zurui Song	B+Resign	W Qiyou Wu
W Eric Lui	W+Resign	B James Sedgwick
B Mengchen Zhang	B+Resign	W Tianyi Chen

Canwa Vancouver 1	0–3	New York City
B Zi Yang (Matthew) Hu	W+Resign	W Ryan Li
W Tianyu (Bill) Lin	B+	B Hanchen Zhang
B Brady Zhang	W+13.5	W Stephanie Yin

Waterloo 1	3–0	Ottawa
B Junliang Zhang	B+0.5	W Guanyu Song
W Quan Sun	W+Time	B Jun Li
B Xijin Dong	B+6.5	W Hanxi Zhang

=== Round 4 ===
February 17, 2019

New Jersey	1–2	New York City
B Alan Huang	B+Forfeit	W Ryan Li
W Willis Huang	B+Resign	B Hanchen Zhang
B Justin Ching	W+Forfeit	W Stephanie Yin

Toronto, ON	2–1	Ottawa
B Edwin Yoon	B+5.5	W Guanyu Song
W Tony Zhao	B+Resign	B Xianyu Li
B James Sedgwick	B+0.5	W Hanxi Zhang

Boston	0–3	Waterloo 1
W Zhongfan Jian	B+Resign	B Wei Qiu
W Jie Liang	B+Resign	B Quan Sun
B Sheng Xu	W+Resign	W Xijin Dong

Greater Washington	2–1	Canwa Vancouver 1
B Tim Zurui Song	W+Resign	W Zi Yang (Matthew) Hu
W Eric Lui	W+Forfeit	Tianyu (Bill) Lin
B Mengchen Zhang	B+11.5	W Brady Zhang

=== Round 5 ===
March 17, 2019

New Jersey	0–3	Greater Washington
B Alan Huang	W+Forfeit	W Tim Zurui Song
W Willis Huang	B+Resign	B Eric Lui
B Justin Ching	W+Resign	W Mengchen Zhang

Canwa Vancouver 1	1–2	Boston
B Zi Yang (Matthew) Hu	W+Resign	W Zhongfan Jian
W Tianyu (Bill) Lin	B+Forfeit	B Jie Liang
B Brady Zhang	B+Resign	W Sheng Xu

Waterloo 1	3–0	Toronto, ON
B Wei Qiu	B+Resign	W Qiyou Wu
W Quan Sun	W+4.5	B Tony Zhao
B Xijin Dong	B+15.5	W James Sedgwick

Ottawa	1–2	New York City
B Guanyu Song	B+Resign	W Ryan Li
W Hanxi Zhang	B+Resign	B Hanchen Zhang
B Yingzhi Chen	W+Resign	W Stephanie Yin

=== Round 6 ===
April 14, 2019

New Jersey	0–3	Waterloo 1
B Kevin Huang	W+Resign	W Wei Qiu
W Willis Huang	B+Resign	B Quan Sun
B Justin Ching	W+Resign	W Xijin Dong

Ottawa	0–3	Canwa Vancouver 1
B Guanyu Song	W+1.5	W Zi Yang (Matthew) Hu
W Jun Li	B+Resign	B Tianyu (Bill) Lin
B Hanxi Zhang	W+Resign	W Brady Zhang

New York City	3–0	Greater Washington
B Ryan Li	B+Resign	W Tim Zurui Song
W Hanchen Zhang	W+Resign	B Eric Lui
B Stephanie Yin	B+Resign	W Mengchen Zhang

Toronto, ON	1–2	Boston
B Qiyou Wu	W+Resign	W Zhongfan Jian
W Tony Zhao	W+Resign	B Jie Liang
B James Sedgwick	W+Resign	W Huiren Yang

=== Round 7 ===
May 19, 2019

New Jersey	2–1	Canwa Vancouver 1
B Alan Huang	B+Forfeit	W Zi Yang (Matthew) Hu
W Willis Huang	B+Resign	B Tianyu (Bill) Lin
B Justin Ching	B+Resign	W Brady Zhang

Waterloo 1	1–2	Greater Washington
B Wei Qiu	W+11.5	W Tim Zurui Song
W Quan Sun	B+9.5	B Eric Lui
B Xijin Dong	B+Resign	W Mengchen Zhang

Ottawa	1–2	Boston
B Guanyu Song	W+Resign	W Zhongfan Jian
W Jun Li	W+4.5	B Jie Liang
B Xianyu Li	W+6.5	W Huiren Yang

New York City	2–1	Toronto, ON
B Ryan Li	W+Resign	W Qiyou Wu
W Hanchen Zhang	W+Resign	B Tony Zhao
B Stephanie Yin	B+14.5	W James Sedgwick

=== Scoreboard ===
Team	Win	Loss	Game win	Game loss
New York City	7	0	18	3
Greater Washington	6	1	15	6
Boston	4	3	10	11
Toronto, ON	3	4	9	12
New Jersey	1	6	3	18

=== face-to-face final ===
New York City	3–0	Greater Washington
Ryan Li 1p	def	Tim Song 1p
Hanchen Zhang 1p	def	Eric Lui 1p
Stephanie Yin 1p	def	Yuan Zhou 7d

== The Eighth AGA City League A in 2020 ==
AGA City League 2020 was played between November 17, 2019, and May 17, 2020.

=== Roster ===
Team	Captain	Players
Canwa Vancouver 1	Cathy (Chen Shuo) Li	Henry Yu, Tianyu (Bill) Lin, Brady Zhang, Zi Yang (Matthew) Hu
New York City	Stephanie Yin	Ryan Li, Hanchen Zhang, Zhongfan Jian, Zhi Yuan (Andy) Liu, Yuxuan Yang
Bay Area	Jeremy Chiu	Mingjiu Jiang, Hajin Lee, Jeremy Chiu, Ary Cheng, Hugh Zhang
Toronto, ON	Howard Wong	Edwin Yoon, Guanyu Song, James Sedgwick, Qiyou Wu, Tony Zhao
Ottawa	Yingzhi Chen	Jun Li, Xianyu Li, Hanxi Zhang, Henry Chen, Yingzhi Chen
Greater Washington	I-Han Lui	Eric Lui, Mengchen Zhang, Yuan Zhou, Kevin Lee
Waterloo 1	Quan Sun	Quan Sun, Xijin Dong, Hao Chen, Junliang Zhang
Boston	Ke Lu	Yilin Xu, Jie Liang, Huiren Yang, Sheng Xu, Ke Lu

=== Round 1 ===
November 17, 2019

Vancouver, BC	0–3	New York City
B Henry Yu	W+Resign	W Ryan Li
W Tianyu (Bill) Lin	B+Resign	B Hanchen Zhang
B Zi Yang (Matthew) Hu	W+Resign	W Zhongfan Jian

Bay Area	3–0	Toronto, ON
B Mingjiu Jiang	B+7.5	W Edwin Yoon
W Hajin Lee	W+Resign	B Guanyu Song
B Jeremy Chiu	B+Resign	W James Sedgwick

Ottawa	0–3	Greater Washington
B Jun Li	W+Time	W Eric Lui
B Xianyu Li	W+Resign	W Mengchen Zhang
B Hanxi Zhang	W+4.5	W Yuan Zhou

Waterloo 1	2–1	Boston
B Hao Chen	B+Resign	W Yilin Xu
W Xijin Dong	W+23.5	B Jie Liang
B Quan Sun	W+Resign	W Huiren Yang

=== Round 2 ===
December 8, 2019

Vancouver, BC	1–2	Greater Washington
B Henry Yu	B+Resign	W Eric Lui
W Tianyu (Bill) Lin	B+Resign	B Mengchen Zhang
B Brady Zhang	W+4.5	W Kevin Lee

Toronto, ON	2–1	Boston
B Edwin Yoon	B+Resign	W Yilin Xu
W Guanyu Song	W+Resign	B Jie Liang
B James Sedgwick	W+Resign	W Huiren Yang

New York City	3–0	Waterloo 1
B Ryan Li	B+Resign	W Quan Sun
W Hanchen Zhang	W+Resign	B Xijin Dong
B Zhongfan Jian	B+Resign	W Hao Chen

Bay Area	3–0	Ottawa
B Mingjiu Jiang	B+29.5	W Yingzhi Chen
W Hajin Lee	W+4.5	B Xianyu Li
B Jeremy Chiu	B+Resign	W Hanxi Zhang

=== Round 3 ===
January 19, 2020

Vancouver, BC	3–0	Waterloo 1
B Henry Yu	B+10.5	W Quan Sun
W Tianyu (Bill) Lin	W+4.5	B Xijin Dong
B Brady Zhang	B+Resign	W Hao Chen

Boston	1–2	Ottawa
B Yilin Xu	B+Resign	W Jun Li
W Jie Liang	B+Resign	B Xianyu Li
B Huiren Yang	W+5.5	W Hanxi Zhang

Greater Washington	1–2	Bay Area
B Eric Lui	B+Resign	W Mingjiu Jiang
W Mengchen Zhang	B+Resign	B Hajin Lee
B Kevin Lee	W+Resign	W Jeremy Chiu

Toronto, ON	0–3	New York City
B Edwin Yoon	W+Forfeit	W Ryan Li
W Guanyu Song	B+Resign	B Hanchen Zhang
B James Sedgwick	W+Resign	W Zhongfan Jian

=== Round 4 ===
February 16, 2020

Vancouver, BC	3–0	Toronto, ON
B Henry Yu	B+16.5	W Edwin Yoon
W Tianyu (Bill) Lin	W+Resign	B Guanyu Song
B Brady Zhang	B+Resign	W Tony Zhao

New York City	3–0	Greater Washington
B Ryan Li	B+Resign	W Eric Lui
W Hanchen Zhang	W+Resign	B Mengchen Zhang
B Zhongfan Jian	B+Time	W Yuan Zhou

Bay Area	3–0	Boston
B Mingjiu Jiang	B+Resign	W Yilin Xu
W Hajin Lee	W+Resign	B Jie Liang
B Jeremy Chiu	B+Resign	W Huiren Yang

Ottawa	1–2	Waterloo 1
W Jun Li	B+0.5	B Quan Sun
W Xianyu Li	B+Resign	B Xijin Dong
B Hanxi Zhang	B+Time	W Hao Chen

=== Round 5 ===
March 15, 2020

Vancouver, BC	2–1	Bay Area
B Henry Yu	B+Resign	W Mingjiu Jiang
W Tianyu (Bill) Lin	W+Resign	B Hajin Lee
B Zi Yang (Matthew) Hu	W+Resign	W Jeremy Chiu

Ottawa	0–3	New York City
B Yingzhi Chen	W+Resign	W Ryan Li
W Henry Chen	B+Resign	B Stephanie Yin
B Hanxi Zhang	W+Resign	W Zhongfan Jian

Waterloo 1	1–2	Toronto, ON
B Quan Sun	W+Resign	W Edwin Yoon
W Xijin Dong	W+Resign	B Qiyou Wu
B Hao Chen	W+Resign	W Tony Zhao

Boston	1–2	Greater Washington
B Yilin Xu	W+Resign	W Eric Lui
W Jie Liang	W+Forfeit	B Mengchen Zhang
B Huiren Yang	W+Resign	W Yuan Zhou

=== Round 6 ===
April 19, 2020

Vancouver, BC	0–3	Ottawa
B Henry Yu	W+Forfeit	W Jun Li
W Tianyu (Bill) Lin	B+Forfeit	B Xianyu Li
B Brady Zhang	W+Forfeit	W Hanxi Zhang

Waterloo 1	2–1	Bay Area
B Quan Sun	B+Resign	W Mingjiu Jiang
W Xijin Dong	B+Resign	B Hajin Lee
B Hao Chen	B+Resign	W Jeremy Chiu

Boston	0–3	New York City
B Yilin Xu	W+Resign	W Ryan Li
W Jie Liang	B+Resign	B Hanchen Zhang
B Huiren Yang	W+Resign	W Zhongfan Jian

Greater Washington	1–2	Toronto, ON
B Eric Lui	W+Resign	W Edwin Yoon
W Mengchen Zhang	B+Resign	B Guanyu Song
B Yuan Zhou	B+Resign	W James Sedgwick

=== Round 7 ===
May 17, 2020

Vancouver, BC	2–1	Boston
B Henry Yu	W+Resign	W Yilin Xu
W Tianyu (Bill) Lin	W+10.5	B Jie Liang
B Brady Zhang	B+Resign	W Huiren Yang

Greater Washington	2–1	Waterloo 1
B Eric Lui	B+0.5	W Quan Sun
W Mengchen Zhang	B+Resign	B Xijin Dong
B Yuan Zhou	B+7.5	W Hao Chen

Toronto, ON	1–2	Ottawa
B Edwin Yoon	W+Resign	W Jun Li
W Guanyu Song	W+Resign	B Xianyu Li
B James Sedgwick	W+Resign	W Hanxi Zhang

New York City	3–0	Bay Area
B Ryan Li	B+Resign	W Mingjiu Jiang
W Hanchen Zhang	W+Resign	B Hajin Lee
B Zhongfan Jian	B+0.5	W Jeremy Chiu

== The Ninth AGA City League 2021 ==
AGA City League 2021 is played between December 6, 2020, and May 23, 2021.

=== AGA City League A 2021 ===
==== Roster ====
Team	Captain	Players
Canwa Vancouver 2	Cathy (Chen Shuo) Li	Kevin Wang, Peter Zhang, Nick Jin, Yue Wang
Greater Washington	I-Han Lui	Eric Lui, Kevin Lee, Yuan Zhou
Ottawa	Yingzhi Chen	Jun Li, Xianyu Li, Henry Chen, Hanxi Zhang, Yingzhi Chen
New York City	Fang Yin	Ryan Li, Hanchen Zhang, Stephanie Yin, Zhi Yuan (Andy) Liu
Canwa Vancouver 1	Cathy (Chen Shuo) Li	Henry Yu, Tianyu (Bill) Lin, Brady Zhang, Zi Yang (Matthew) Hu
Chicago	Albert Yen	Tim Zurui Song, Calvin Sun, Albert Yen, Qipeng Luo
Toronto, ON	James Sedgwick	Guanyu Song, Tony Zhao, Qiyou Wu, Edwin Yoon, James Sedgwick
Bay Area	Andreas Hauenstein	Hajin Lee, Mingjiu Jiang, Ary Cheng, Jeremy Chiu, Andreas Hauenstein

==== Round 1 ====
December 6, 2020

Canwa Vancouver 2	0-3	Greater Washington
B Kevin Wang	W+Resign	W Eric Lui
W Peter Zhang	B+Resign	B Kevin Lee
B Nick Jin	W+Resign	W Yuan Zhou

Ottawa	0-3	New York City
B Yingzhi Chen	W+Resign	W Ryan Li
W Xianyu Li	B+Resign	B Hanchen Zhang
B Henry Chen	W+Resign	W Stephanie Yin

Canwa Vancouver 1	3-0	Chicago
B Henry Yu	B+Resign	W Tim Zurui Song
W Tianyu (Bill) Lin	W+Resign	B Calvin Sun
B Brady Zhang	B+Resign	W Albert Yen

Toronto, ON	3-0	Bay Area
B Guanyu Song	B+Resign	W Hajin Lee
W Tony Zhao	W+2.5	B Mingjiu Jiang
B Qiyou Wu	B+Resign	W Ary Cheng

==== Round 2 ====
January 10, 2021

Canwa Vancouver 2	0–3	Bay Area
B Kevin Wang	W+Resign	W Hajin Lee
W Peter Zhang	B+8.5	B Ary Cheng
B Nick Jin	W+Resign	W Jeremy Chiu

Chicago	2–1	Toronto, ON
B Tim Zurui Song	W+Resign	W Guanyu Song
W Calvin Sun	W+Resign	B Tony Zhao
B Qipeng Luo	B+10.5	W Qiyou Wu

New York City	2–1	Canwa Vancouver 1
B Ryan Li	W+Resign	W Henry Yu
W Hanchen Zhang	W+Resign	B Tianyu (Bill) Lin
B Stephanie Yin	B+Resign	W Brady Zhang

Greater Washington	3–0	Ottawa
B Eric Lui	B+Resign	W Jun Li
W Kevin Lee	W+Resign	B Xianyu Li
B Yuan Zhou	B+Resign	W Hanxi Zhang

==== Round 3 ====
January 31, 2021

Canwa Vancouver 2	1–2	Ottawa
B Kevin Wang	W+Resign	W Jun Li
W Peter Zhang	B+Resign	B Henry Chen
B Nick Jin	B+3.5	W Hanxi Zhang

Canwa Vancouver 1	2–1	Greater Washington
B Henry Yu	B+Resign	W Eric Lui
W Tianyu (Bill) Lin	W+Resign	B Kevin Lee
B Brady Zhang	W+Resign	W Yuan Zhou

Toronto, ON	0–3	New York City
B Guanyu Song	W+Resign	W Ryan Li
W Tony Zhao	B+Resign	B Hanchen Zhang
B Edwin Yoon	W+7.5	W Stephanie Yin

Bay Area	2–1	Chicago
B Hajin Lee	B+4.5	W Qipeng Luo
W Mingjiu Jiang	W+Resign	B Calvin Sun
B Ary Cheng	W+Resign	W Albert Yen

==== Round 4 ====
February 21, 2021

Canwa Vancouver 2	1–2	Chicago
B Kevin Wang	B+Forfeit	W Tim Zurui Song
W Peter Zhang	B+Resign	B Calvin Sun
B Nick Jin	W+29.5	W Albert Yen

New York City	3–0	Bay Area
B Ryan Li	B+Time	W Hajin Lee
W Hanchen Zhang	W+Resign	B Mingjiu Jiang
B Stephanie Yin	B+Resign	W Ary Cheng

Greater Washington	1–2	Toronto, ON
B Eric Lui	W+Resign	W Guanyu Song
W Kevin Lee	B+Resign	B Tony Zhao
B Yuan Zhou	B+Resign	W Qiyou Wu

Ottawa	1–2	Canwa Vancouver 1
B Jun Li	B+Resign	W Henry Yu
W Xianyu Li	B+Resign	B Tianyu (Bill) Lin
B Henry Chen	W+Resign	W Brady Zhang

==== Round 5 ====
March 21, 2021

Canwa Vancouver 2	0–3	Canwa Vancouver 1
B Kevin Wang	W+Resign	W Henry Yu
B Peter Zhang	W+Resign	W Tianyu (Bill) Lin
B Nick Jin	W+10.5	W Brady Zhang

Toronto, ON	3–0	Ottawa
B Guanyu Song	B+0.5	W Jun Li
W Tony Zhao	W+Resign	B Xianyu Li
B Qiyou Wu	B+Resign	W Henry Chen

Bay Area	1–2	Greater Washington
B Jeremy Chiu	W+Resign	W Eric Lui
W Mingjiu Jiang	W+4.5	B Kevin Lee
B Ary Cheng	W+Resign	W Yuan Zhou

Chicago	0–3	New York City
B Tim Zurui Song	W+Resign	W Ryan Li
W Calvin Sun	B+Forfeit	B Hanchen Zhang
B Albert Yen	W+Resign	W Stephanie Yin

==== Round 6 ====
April 18, 2021

Canwa Vancouver 2	1–2	New York City
B Kevin Wang	W+Resign	W Ryan Li
W Peter Zhang	B+Resign	B Hanchen Zhang
B Nick Jin	W+23.5	W Stephanie Yin

Greater Washington	1–2	Chicago
B Eric Lui	W+Resign	W Tim Zurui Song
W Kevin Lee	B+Resign	B Calvin Sun
B Yuan Zhou	B+Resign	W Albert Yen

Ottawa	1–2	Bay Area
B Jun Li	W+Resign	W Hajin Lee
W Xianyu Li	W+5.5	B Mingjiu Jiang
B Henry Chen	W+24.5	W Ary Cheng

Canwa Vancouver 1	1–2	Toronto, ON
B Henry Yu	W+Resign	W Guanyu Song
W Tianyu (Bill) Lin	W+2.5	B Edwin Yoon
B Brady Zhang	W+25.5	W Qiyou Wu

==== Round 7 ====
May 23, 2021

Canwa Vancouver 2	2–1	Toronto, ON
B Kevin Wang	B+Resign	W Guanyu Song
W Peter Zhang	B+Resign	B Tony Zhao
B Nick Jin	B+Resign	W Qiyou Wu

Bay Area	0–3	Canwa Vancouver 1
B Hajin Lee	W+10.5	W Henry Yu
W Mingjiu Jiang	B+Resign	B Tianyu (Bill) Lin
B Ary Cheng	W+Resign	W Brady Zhang

Chicago	2–1	Ottawa
B Tim Zurui Song	B+Resign	W Hanxi Zhang
W Calvin Sun	B+Resign	B Xianyu Li
B Albert Yen	B+Resign	W Henry Chen

New York City	1–2	Greater Washington
B Ryan Li	W+Resign	W Eric Lui
W Hanchen Zhang	W+Resign	B Kevin Lee
B Stephanie Yin	W+Resign	W Yuan Zhou

=== AGA City League B 2021 ===
==== Roster ====
Team	Captain	Players
Washington DC 3	Justin Teng	Justin Teng, Fredrick Bao, Ashish Varma, Joshua Lee,
Boston	Ke Lu	Huiren Yang, Sheng Xu, Ruihan Cao, Ke Lu
Montreal	Yoonyoung Kim	Yoonyoung Kim, Remi Campagnie, Manuel Velasco, Avery Deng, Jianqiu Chen
Seattle 1	Sonny Cho	Peter Oh, Xinlei (Alex) Liu, Bob Liang, Richie Lou
Cincinnati	Frank Luo	Ning Shao, Zhiyang Li, Karl Wei, Bingzhi Shi, Tong Qiu
Los Angeles	Seowoo Wang	Mark Lee, Hoon Jo, Seowoo Wang, Lionel Zhang
Atlanta 1	Kevin Tang	Feijun Luo, Brandon Zhou, Kevin Tang
Chicago 2	Albert Yen	Peter Gao, Tianyuan Zhang, Yang Yang

==== Round 1 ====
December 6, 2020

Washington DC 3	1–2	Boston
B Justin Teng	W+Resign	W Huiren Yang
W Fredrick Bao	B+Resign	B Sheng Xu
B Ashish Varma	B+Time	W Ruihan Cao

Montreal	2–1	Seattle 1
B Yoonyoung Kim	B+Resign	W Peter Oh
W Remi Campagnie	W+Resign	B Xinlei (Alex) Liu
B Manuel Velasco	W+0.5	W Bob Liang

Cincinnati	1–2	Los Angeles
W Ning Shao	B+Resign	B Mark Lee
Zhiyang Li	B+2.5	B Hoon Jo
B Karl Wei	B+Resign	W Seowoo Wang

Atlanta 1	1–2	Chicago 2
B Feijun Luo	B+Resign	W Peter Gao
W Brandon Zhou	B+Resign	B Tianyuan Zhang
B Kevin Tang	W+11.5	W Yang Yang

==== Round 2 ====
January 10, 2021

Washington DC 3	0 – 3	Montreal
B Justin Teng	W+Resign	W Yoonyoung Kim
W Fredrick Bao	B+Resign	B Remi Campagnie
B Ashish Varma	W+Resign	W Manuel Velasco

Cincinnati	1–2	Boston
B Ning Shao	W+Resign	W Huiren Yang
W Zhiyang Li	B+Resign	B Sheng Xu
B Karl Wei	B+Resign	W Ke Lu

Atlanta 1	1–2	Seattle 1
B Feijun Luo	W+Resign	W Peter Oh
W Brandon Zhou	B+Resign	B Xinlei (Alex) Liu
B Kevin Tang	B+Resign	W Bob Liang

Chicago 2	1–2	Los Angeles
W Peter Gao	B+Resign	B Mark Lee
W Tianyuan Zhang	W+Resign	B Hoon Jo
B Yang Yang	W+Resign	W Seowoo Wang

==== Round 3 ====
January 31, 2021

Washington DC 3	0–3	Seattle 1
B Justin Teng	W+5.5	W Richie Lou
W Fredrick Bao	B+Resign	B Xinlei (Alex) Liu
B Ashish Varma	W+1.5	W Bob Liang

Boston	2–1	Los Angeles
B Huiren Yang	W+0.5	W Mark Lee
W Sheng Xu	W+Resign	B Hoon Jo
B Ke Lu	B+0.5	W Seowoo Wang

Montreal	3–0	Chicago 2
B Yoonyoung Kim	B+Resign	W Peter Gao
W Remi Campagnie	W+Resign	B Tianyuan Zhang
B Manuel Velasco	B+Resign	W Yang Yang

Cincinnati	2–1	Atlanta 1
B Ning Shao	W+Resign	W Feijun Luo
W Zhiyang Li	W+Resign	B Brandon Zhou
B Karl Wei	B+Resign	W Kevin Tang

==== Round 4 ====
February 21, 2021

Washington DC 3	1–2	Los Angeles
B Justin Teng	W+Resign	W Mark Lee
W Fredrick Bao	W+Resign	B Hoon Jo
B Ashish Varma	W+Resign	W Seowoo Wang

Seattle 1	3–0	Chicago 2
B Richie Lou	B+Resign	W Peter Gao
W Xinlei (Alex) Liu	W+Resign	B Tianyuan Zhang
B Bob Liang	B+Resign	W Yang Yang

Boston	2–1	Atlanta 1
B Huiren Yang	B+Resign	W Feijun Luo
W Sheng Xu	W+0.5	B Brandon Zhou
B Ruihan Cao	W+9.5	W Kevin Tang

Montreal	1–2	Cincinnati
B Avery Deng	B+Resign	W Ning Shao
W Remi Campagnie	B+2.5	B Tong Qiu
B Manuel Velasco	W+Resign	W Karl Wei

==== Round 5 ====
March 21, 2021

Washington DC	3–0	Cincinnati
B Justin Teng	B+Resign	W Ning Shao
W Fredrick Bao	W+Resign	B Zhiyang Li
B Joshua Lee	B+Resign	W Bingzhi Shi

Atlanta 1	3–0	Montreal
B Feijun Luo	B+Forfeit	W Yoonyoung Kim
W Brandon Zhou	W+Forfeit	B Remi Campagnie
B Kevin Tang	B+Forfeit	W Manuel Velasco

Chicago 2	1–2	Boston
B Peter Gao	W+Resign	W Huiren Yang
W Tianyuan Zhang	B+Resign	B Sheng Xu
B Yang Yang	B+Forfeit	W Ruihan Cao

Los Angeles	1–2	Seattle 1
B Mark Lee	B+Resign	Peter Oh
W Hoon Jo	B+Resign	B Xinlei (Alex) Liu
B Seowoo Wang	W+19.5	W Bob Liang

==== Round 6 ====
April 18, 2021

Washington DC	1–2	Chicago 2
B Justin Teng	B+Resign	W Peter Gao
W Fredrick Bao	B+Resign	B Tianyuan Zhang
B Ashish Varma	W+Time	W Yang Yang

Los Angeles	2–1	Atlanta 1
B Mark Lee	B+Resign	W Feijun Luo
W Hoon Jo	B+Resign	B Brandon Zhou
B Seowoo Wang	B+Resign	W Kevin Tang

Seattle 1	3-0	Cincinnati
B Peter Oh	B+Resign	W Ning Shao
W Xinlei (Alex) Liu	W+Resign	B Zhiyang Li
B Bob Liang	B+9.5	W Karl Wei

Boston	3–0	Montreal
B Huiren Yang	B+Forfeit	W Yoonyoung Kim
W Sheng Xu	W+Forfeit	B Remi Campagnie
B Ruihan Cao	B+Forfeit	W Manuel Velasco

==== Round 7 ====
May 23, 2021

Washington DC 3	2-1	Atlanta 1
B Justin Teng	B+1.5	W Feijun Luo
W Fredrick Bao	B+2.5	B Brandon Zhou
B Ashish Varma	B+Forfeit	W Kevin Tang

Chicago 2	2-1	Cincinnati
W Peter Gao	W+Resign	B Ning Shao
W Tianyuan Zhang	W+Resign	B Zhiyang Li
B Yang Yang	W+Resign	W Karl Wei

Los Angeles	3–0	Montreal
B Mark Lee	B+Forfeit	W Yoonyoung Kim
W Hoon Jo	W+Forfeit	B Remi Campagnie
B Seowoo Wang	B+Forfeit	W Manuel Velasco

Seattle 1	1–2	Boston
B Richie Lou	W+Resign	W Huiren Yang
W Xinlei (Alex) Liu	W+11.5	B Sheng Xu
B Bob Liang	W+6.5	W Ke Lu

== The Tenth AGA City League A in 2022 ==
AGA City League 2022 was played between January 9, 2022 and June 12, 2020.

=== Roster ===
Team	Captain	Players
Chicago	Albert Yen	Tim (Zirui) Song, Calvin Sun, Albert Yen, Qipeng Luo
Canwa Vancouver	Cathy (ChenShuo) Li	Henry Yu, Tianyu (Bill) Lin, Brady Zhang
Toronto, ON	James Sedgwick	Guanyu Song, Edwin Yoon, Tony Zhao, Qiyou Wu, James Sedgwick
Seattle 1	Sonny Cho	Xinlei (Alex) Liu, Sung-yen Liu, Steve Stringfellow, Richie Lou
Ottawa	Yingzhi Chen	Jun Li, Xianyu Li, Henry Chen, Hanxi Zhang, Yingzhi Chen
New York City	Fang Yin	Ryan Li, Stephanie Yin, Zhaonian Chen, Zhi Yuan (Andy) Liu,
Los Angeles	Seowoo Wang	Hoon Jo, Lionel Zhang, Seowoo Wang, Mark Lee
Boston	Ke Lu	Huiren Yang, Jie Liang, Jeremiah Donley, Zhiping You, Hancheng Xu

==== Round 1 ====
January 09, 2022

Chicago	1–2	Canwa Vancouver 1
B Tim Zurui Song	B+Resign	W Henry Yu
W Calvin Sun	B+Resign	B Tianyu (Bill) Lin
B Albert Yen	W+Resign	W Brady Zhang

Toronto, ON	3–0	Seattle 1
B Guanyu Song	B+Resign	W Xinlei (Alex) Liu
W Qiyou Wu	W+Resign	B Sung-yen Liu
B James Sedgwick	B+Resign	W Steve Stringfellow

Ottawa	0–3	New York City
B Yingzhi Chen	W+Resign	W Ryan Li
W Hanxi Zhang	B+Resign	B Stephanie Yin
B Henry Chen	W+Resign	W Zhaonian Chen

Los Angeles	2–1	Boston
B Hoon Jo	W+Time	W Huiren Yang
W Lionel Zhang	W+Resign	B Jie Liang
B Seowoo Wang	B+Resign	W Jeremiah Donley

==== Round 2 ====
January 30, 2022

Chicago	2–1	Los Angeles
B Tim Zurui Song	B+Resign	W Hoon Jo
W Calvin Sun	B+Resign	B Lionel Zhang
B Albert Yen	B+Resign	W Seowoo Wang

Boston	1–2	Ottawa
B Huiren Yang	B+Resign	W Hanxi Zhang
W Jie Liang	B+1.5	B Xianyu Li
B Zhiping You	W+14.5	W Henry Chen

New York City	2–1	Toronto, ON
B Ryan Li	B+Resign	W Guanyu Song
W Stephanie Yin	W+Resign	B Edwin Yoon
B Zhaonian Chen	W+Resign	W Tony Zhao

Seattle 1	1–2	Canwa Vancouver 1
B Xinlei (Alex) Liu	B+Resign	W Henry Yu
W Sung-yen Liu	B+Resign	B Tianyu (Bill) Lin
B Steve Stringfellow	W+Resign	W Brady Zhang

==== Round 3 ====
February 27, 2022

Chicago	3–0	Boston
B Tim Zurui Song	B+Resign	W Huiren Yang
W Calvin Sun	W+Resign	B Jie Liang
B Albert Yen	B+Resign	W Jeremiah Donley

New York City	3–0	Los Angeles
B Ryan Li	B+Resign	W Hoon Jo
W Stephanie Yin	W+Resign	B Lionel Zhang
B Zhaonian Chen	B+Resign	W Seowoo Wang

Seattle 1	2–1	Ottawa
B Xinlei (Alex) Liu	B+Resign	W Hanxi Zhang
W Sung-yen Liu	W+Resign	B Xianyu Li
B Steve Stringfellow	W+13.5	W Henry Chen

Canwa Vancouver 1	2–1	Toronto, ON
B Henry Yu	W+Resign	W Guanyu Song
W Tianyu (Bill) Lin	W+Resign	B Edwin Yoon
B Brady Zhang	B+Resign	W Qiyou Wu

==== Round 4 ====
March 20, 2022

Chicago	3–0	Ottawa
W Tim Zurui Song	W+Resign	B Hanxi Zhang
W Calvin Sun	W+9.5	B Xianyu Li
W Albert Yen	W+29.5	B Henry Chen

Los Angeles	1–2	Toronto, ON
B Hoon Jo	W+Resign	W Guanyu Song
W Lionel Zhang	B+Resign	B Edwin Yoon
B Seowoo Wang	B+Resign	W Tony Zhao

Boston	0–3	Canwa Vancouver 1
B Huiren Yang	W+12.5	W Henry Yu
W Jie Liang	B+Resign	B Tianyu (Bill) Lin
B Jeremiah Donley	W+9.5	W Brady Zhang

New York City	2–1	Seattle 1
B Ryan Li	W+Resign	W Xinlei (Alex) Liu
W Stephanie Yin	W+Resign	B Sung-yen Liu
B Zhaonian Chen	B+Resign	W Steve Stringfellow

==== Round 5 ====
April 24, 2022

Chicago	2–1	New York City
W Tim Zurui Song	W+Resign	B Ryan Li
B Calvin Sun	W+Resign	W Stephanie Yin
W Albert Yen	W+Resign	B Zhaonian Chen

Seattle 1	1–2	Boston
B Xinlei (Alex) Liu	B+25.5	W Huiren Yang
W Sung-yen Liu	B+6.5	B Jie Liang
B Steve Stringfellow	W+6.5	W Jeremiah Donley

Canwa Vancouver 1	3–0	Los Angeles
B Henry Yu	B+Resign	W Hoon Jo
W Tianyu (Bill) Lin	W+Resign	B Lionel Zhang
B Brady Zhang	B+Forfeit	W Seowoo Wang

Toronto, ON	0–3	Ottawa
B Guanyu Song	W+Resign	W Yingzhi Chen
B Edwin Yoon	B+Resign	W Xianyu Li
B James Sedgwick	W+5.5	W Henry Chen

==== Round 6 ====
May 15, 2022

Chicago	3–0	Toronto, ON
W Tim Zurui Song	W+4.5	B Guanyu Song
W Calvin Sun	W+0.5	B Tony Zhao
W Albert Yen	W+Resign	B Edwin Yoon

Ottawa	0–3	Canwa Vancouver 1
B Yingzhi Chen	W+Resign	W Henry Yu
W Hanxi Zhang	B+Resign	B Tianyu (Bill) Lin
B Henry Chen	W+23.5	W Brady Zhang

Los Angeles	2–1	Seattle 1
B Mark Lee	B+2.5	W Xinlei (Alex) Liu
W Hoon Jo	B+Resign	B Sung-yen Liu
B Seowoo Wang	B+Resign	W Steve Stringfellow

Boston	0–3	New York City
B Huiren Yang	W+Resign	W Ryan Li
W Jie Liang	B+Resign	B Stephanie Yin
B Jeremiah Donley	W+Resign	W Zhaonian Chen

==== Round 7 ====
June 12, 2022

Chicago	3–0	Seattle 1
B Tim Zurui Song	B+4.5	W Xinlei (Alex) Liu
W Calvin Sun	W+Resign	B Sung-yen Liu
W Qipeng Luo	W+Resign	B Steve Stringfellow

Canwa Vancouver 1	1–2	New York City
B Henry Yu	W+Resign	W Ryan Li
W Tianyu (Bill) Lin	W+Resign	B Stephanie Yin
B Brady Zhang	W+Resign	W Zhaonian Chen

Toronto, ON	3–0	Boston
B Guanyu Song	B+7.5	W Huiren Yang
W Qiyou Wu	W+Resign	B Jie Liang
B Tony Zhao	B+Resign	W Jeremiah Donley

Ottawa	1–2	Los Angeles
B Yingzhi Chen	W+Resign	W Hoon Jo
W Xianyu Li	W+Resign	B Lionel Zhang
B Henry Chen	W+7.5	W Seowoo Wang

== The Eleventh AGA City League in 2023 ==
AGA City League 2023 is played between January 8 2023 and June 4 2023.

=== Round 1 ===
January 8, 2023

==== League A ====
Canwa Vancouver 1	2–1	Chicago
B Henry Yu	W+Resign	W Tim Zurui Song
W Tianyu (Bill) Lin	W+Resign	B Calvin Sun
B Brady Zhang	B+1.5	W Qipeng Luo

Toronto, ON	1–2	Ottawa
B Guanyu Song	B+Resign	W Jianming Hao
W Tony Zhao	B+Resign	B Xianyu Li
B James Sedgwick	W+Resign	W Yingzhi Chen

Los Angeles	0–3	New York City
B Jiehui Kwa	W+4.5	W Ryan Li
W Hoon Jo	B+Resign	B Alexander Qi
W Seowoo Wang	W+Resign	B Zhaonian Chen

Seattle 1	1–2	Ithaca
B Fuzhi (Alvin) Huang	B+Resign	W Aaron Ye
W Sung-yen Liu	B+Resign	B Hongkui Zheng
B Zixuan Gao	W+Resign	W Ninghan Duan

==== League B ====
Canwa Vancouver 4	1–2	NC Raleigh
B Ray Chen	W+Resign	W Pengyu Guo
B Ethan Lu	W+Resign	W Chen Zhang
W Minhao Shen	W+Resign	B Yi Li

Washington DC 2	2–1	Boston
W Yaming Wang	B+5.5	B Huiren Yang
B Zhiyuan (Edward) Zhang	B+Resign	W Jie Liang
B Zhenying Gu	B+15.5	W Annie Wagner

Los Angeles 3	2–1	Chicago 2
W King Bi	W+Resign	B Yiwei Shi
B Kevin Huang	B+Resign	W Tianyuan Zhang
B Kosuke Sato	W+Resign	W Sungsoo Kim

Canwa Vancouver 2	0–3	Denver
B Jay Yang	W+Resign	W Tony Tang
W Nick Jin	B+Resign	B Bowen Zhang
B Hao Hu	W+Resign	W Yan Jin

=== Round 2 ===
January 29 2023

==== League A ====
Toronto, ON	1–2	Canwa Vancouver 1
B Guanyu Song	B+Resign	W Henry Yu
W Tony Zhao	B+Resign	B Tianyu (Bill) Lin
B James Sedgwick	W+12.5	W Brady Zhang

Chicago	3–0	Los Angeles
B Tim Zurui Song	B+Forfeit	W Jiehui Kwa
W Calvin Sun	W+Resign	B Hoon Jo
B Albert Yen	B+Resign	W Seowoo Wang

Ottawa	1-2	Seattle 1
B Hanxi Zhang	W+Resign	W Fuzhi (Alvin) Huang
W Xianyu Li	W+Resign	B Sung-yen Liu
B Yingzhi Chen	W+Resign	W Zixuan Gao

New York City	2-1	Ithaca
B Ryan Li	B+Resign	W Aaron Ye
W Alexander Qi	B+3.5	B Hongkui Zheng
B Zhaonian Chen	B+Resign	W Ninghan Duan

==== League B ====
Boston	2-1	Canwa Vancouver 4
B Huiren Yang	B+Resign	W Ray Chen
W Jie Liang	W+Resign	B Minhao Shen
B Annie Wagner	W+6.5	W Ethan Lu

NC Raleigh	1-2	Los Angeles 3
B Pengyu Guo	B+Resign	W King Bi
W Yi Li	B+Resign	B Kevin Huang
B Chen Zhang	W+Resign	W Kosuke Sato

Denver	3-0	Washington DC 2
B Tony Tang	B+Resign	W Zhiyuan (Edward) Zhang
W Bowen Zhang	W+Resign	B Yaming Wang
B Yan Jin	B+Resign	W Zhenying Gu

Chicago 2	1-2	New Jersey
B Yiwei Shi	W+Resign	W Minshan Shou
W Cheuk To Tsui	B+1.5	B Xinyu Tu
B Sungsoo Kim	B+10.5	W Blake Kang

=== Round 3 ===
February 26, 2023

==== League A ====
Canwa Vancouver 1	3–0	Los Angeles
B Henry Yu	B+Forfeit	W Jiehui Kwa
W Tianyu (Bill) Lin	W+Forfeit	B Hoon Jo
B Brady Zhang	B+Forfeit	W Seowoo Wang

Seattle 1	2–1	Toronto, ON
B Fuzhi (Alvin) Huang	B+Resign	W Henry Chen
W Sung-yen Liu	B+Resign	B Winston Bai
B Zixuan Gao	B+Resign	W James Sedgwick

Ithaca	0–3	Chicago
B Aaron Ye	W+Resign	W Tim Zurui Song
W Hongkui Zheng	W+Forfeit	B Calvin Sun
B Ninghan Duan	W+Forfeit	W Albert Yen

New York City	3–0	Ottawa
B Ryan Li	B+26.5	W Hanxi Zhang
W Alexander Qi	W+8.5	B Xianyu Li
B Zhaonian Chen	B+Resign	W Yingzhi Chen

==== League B ====
Los Angeles 3	1–2	Boston
B King Bi	W+Resign	W Huiren Yang
W Kevin Huang	W+Resign	B Jie Liang
B Kosuke Sato	W+Forfeit	W Annie Wagner

Canwa Vancouver 4	0–3	Denver
B Ray Chen	W+Resign	W Tony Tang
W Minhao Shen	B+Resign	B Bowen Zhang
B Ethan Lu	W+Resign	W Yan Jin

New Jersey	1–2	NC Raleigh
B Jun Wang	W+Resign	W Pengyu Guo
W Xinyu Tu	W+0.5	B Yi Li
B Blake Kang	B+2.5	W Chen Zhang

Washington DC 2	2–1	Canwa Vancouver 2
B Zhiyuan (Edward) Zhang	W+22.5	W Jay Yang
W Liang Yu	W+2.5	B Zhiqiang Zhang
B Zhenying Gu	B+Resign	W Hao Hu

=== Round 4 ===
March 19, 2023

==== League A ====
Seattle 1	1–2	Canwa Vancouver 1
B Fuzhi (Alvin) Huang	B+Resign	W Henry Yu
W Sung-yen Liu	B+Resign	B Tianyu (Bill) Lin
B Zixuan Gao	W+25.5	W Brady Zhang

Los Angeles	3–0	Ithaca
B Jiehui Kwa	B+Forfeit	W Aaron Ye
W Hoon Jo	W+Forfeit	B Hongkui Zheng
B Seowoo Wang	B+Forfeit	W Ninghan Duan

Toronto, ON	1–2	New York City
B Guanyu Song	B+Resign	W Ryan Li
W Henry Chen	B+18.5	B Alexander Qi
B James Sedgwick	W+Resign	W Zhaonian Chen

Chicago	2–1	Ottawa
B Tim Zurui Song	B+38.5	W Jianming Hao
W Qipeng Luo	B+Resign	B Xianyu Li
B Albert Yen	B+15.5	W Yingzhi Chen

==== League B ====
Denver	1–2	Los Angeles 3
B Tony Tang	B+Resign	W King Bi
W Bowen Zhang	B+Time	B Kevin Huang
B Yan Jin	W+1.5	W Kosuke Sato

Boston	2–1	New Jersey
B Huiren Yang	B+3.5	W Minshan Shou
W Jie Liang	W+9.5	B Xinyu Tu
B Zhiping You	W+18.5	W Blake Kang

Canwa Vancouver 2	2–1	Canwa Vancouver 4
B Jay Yang	B+1.5	W Ray Chen
W Nick Jin	B+Resign	B Minhao Shen
B Hao Hu	B+Resign	W Ethan Lu

NC Raleigh	3–0	Chicago 2
B Pengyu Guo	B+Forfeit	W Yiwei Shi
W Yi Li	W+10.5	B Tianyuan Zhang
B Chen Zhang	B+0.5	W Sungsoo Kim

=== Round 5 ===
April 16, 2023

==== League A ====
Canwa Vancouver 1	3–0	Ithaca
B Henry Yu	B+Forfeit	W Aaron Ye
W Tianyu (Bill) Lin	W+Forfeit	B Hongkui Zheng
B Brady Zhang	B+Forfeit	W Ninghan Duan

New York City	3-0	Seattle 1
B Ryan Li	B+Forfeit	W Xinlei (Alex) Liu
W Alexander Qi	W+Resign	B Sung-yen Liu
B Zhaonian Chen	B+Resign	W Zixuan Gao

Ottawa	3-0	Los Angeles
B Hanxi Zhang	B+Forfeit	W Jiehui Kwa
W Xianyu Li	W+Resign	B Hoon Jo
B Yingzhi Chen	B+Forfeit	W Seowoo Wang

Chicago	3-0	Toronto, ON
B Tim Zirui Song	B+Forfeit	W Guanyu Song
W Calvin Sun	W+2.5	B Tong Zhao
B Albert Yen	B+6.5	W James Sedgwick

==== League B ====
New Jersey	0-3	Denver
B Minshan Shou	W+Resign	W Tony Tang
W Jun Wang	B+Resign	B Bowen Zhang
B Blake Kang	W+Resign	W Yan Jin

Los Angeles 3	2–0	Canwa Vancouver 2
W King Bi	W+7.5	B Jay Yang
W Kevin Huang		B Nick Jin
B Kosuke Sato	B+Resign	W Hao Hu

Chicago 2	1–2	Boston
B Yiwei Shi	W+Forfeit	W Huiren Yang
W Cheuk To Tsui	B+Resign	B Jie Liang
B Sungsoo Kim	B+Resign	W Annie Wagner

Canwa Vancouver 4	1–2	Washington DC 2
B Ray Chen	W+Resign	W Zhiyuan (Edward) Zhang
W Minhao Shen	B+Resign	B Yaming Wang
B Ethan Lu	B+Resign	W Zhenying Gu

=== Round 6 ===
May 7, 2023

==== League A ====
New York City	1–2	Canwa Vancouver 1
B Ryan Li	B+Resign	W Henry Yu
W Alexander Qi	B+Resign	B Tianyu (Bill) Lin
B Zhaonian Chen	W+Resign	W Brady Zhang

Ithaca	0–3	Ottawa
B Aaron Ye	W+Forfeit	W Hanxi Zhang (croc) 5 dan
W Hongkui Zheng	B+Forfeit	B Xianyu Li
B Ninghan Duan	W+Forfeit	W Yingzhi Chen

Seattle 1	0–3	Chicago
W Xinlei (Alex) Liu	B+Forfeit	B Tim Zurui Song
W Sung-yen Liu	B+Resign	B Calvin Sun
B Zixuan Gao	W+Resign	W Albert Yen

Los Angeles	2–1	Toronto, ON
W Jiehui Kwa	W+Resign	B Guanyu Song
W Hoon Jo	B+Resign	B Tony Zhao
W Seowoo Wang	W+0.5	B James Sedgwick

==== League B ====
Canwa Vancouver 2	1–2	New Jersey
B Jay Yang	W+Resign	W Minshan Shou
B Zhiqiang Zhang	W+Resign	W Xinyu Tu
B Hao Hu	B+Resign	W Blake Kang

Denver	vs	Chicago 2
B Tony Tang	B+Resign	W Yiwei Shi
W Bowen Zhang	vs	B Cheuk To Tsui
B Yan Jin	W+Resign	W Sungsoo Kim

Washington DC 2	1–2	Los Angeles 3
B Zhiyuan (Edward) Zhang	W+7.5	W King Bi
W Yaming Wang	B+Resign	B Kevin Huang
B Liang Yu	B+Forfeit	W Kosuke Sato

Boston	1–2	NC Raleigh
B Huiren Yang	B+Forfeit	W Pengyu Guo
W Jie Liang	B+Resign	B Yi Li
B Annie Wagner	W+Resign	W Chen Zhang

=== Round 7 ===
June 4, 2023

==== League A ====
Canwa Vancouver 1	3-0	Ottawa
B Henry Yu	B+Resign	W Jianming Hao
W Tianyu (Bill) Lin	W+Resign	B Xianyu Li
B Brady Zhang	B+Time	W Yingzhi Chen

Chicago	1-2	New York City
B Tim Zurui Song	W+Resign	W Ryan Li
W Calvin Sun	B+Time	B Alexander Qi
B Albert Yen	B+3.5	W Zhaonian Chen

Toronto, ON	3–0	Ithaca
B Guanyu Song	B+Forfeit	W Aaron Ye
W Tony Zhao	W+Forfeit	B Hongkui Zheng
B James Sedgwick	B+Forfeit	W Ninghan Duan

Los Angeles	0–3	Seattle 1
B Jiehui Kwa	W+0.5	W Fuzhi (Alvin) Huang
W Hoon Jo	B+Time	B Sung-yen Liu
W Seowoo Wang	B+Forfeit	B Zixuan Gao

==== League B ====
Chicago 2	vs	Canwa Vancouver 2
B Yiwei Shi	vs	W Jay Yang
W Tianyuan Zhang	vs	B Nick Jin
B Sungsoo Kim	vs	W Hao Hu

New Jersey	3–0	Washington DC 2
B Jun Wang	B+Resign	W Zhiyuan (Edward) Zhang
W Xinyu Tu	W+7.5	B Yaming Wang
B Blake Kang	B+7.5	W Liang Yu

NC Raleigh	0-2	Denver
B Pengyu Guo	W+Resign	W Tony Tang
W Yi Li	vs	B Bowen Zhang
B Chen Zhang	W+Resign	W Yan Jin

Los Angeles 3	2-0	Canwa Vancouver 4
B King Bi	B+Resign	W Ray Chen
W Kevin Huang	W+Resign	B Minhao Shen
B Kosuke Sato	vs	W Ethan Lu

== The Twelfth AGA City League A in 2024 ==
AGA City League 2024 was played between January 7 2024 and June 9 2024.

=== Round 1 ===
January 7, 2024

Toronto, ON	2–1	Canwa Vancouver 1
B Kaining Huang	B+Resign	W Henry Yu
W Leo Tan	B+Resign	B Tianyu (Bill) Lin
B Guanyu Song	B+Resign	W Brady Zhang

Chicago	1-2	Seattle 1
B Albert Yen	W+Resign	W Harrison Dow
W Sungsoo Kim	W+13.5	B Kenny Jin
B Cheuk To Tsui	W+Resign	W Zixuan Gao

Ottawa	1-2	Boston
B Jun Li	B+Resign	W Huiren Yang
W Hanxi Zhang	B+Resign	B Xiaodi Huang
B Yingzhi Chen	W+Resign	W Jate Greene

New York City	3-0	Denver
W Zhaonian Chen	W+0.5	B Matthew Harwit
W Alexander Qi	W+Time	B Yan Jin
B Ryan Li	B+Resign	W Bowen Zhang

=== Round 2 ===
January 28, 2024

Canwa Vancouver 1	3-0	Seattle
B Henry Yu	B+Forfeit	W Harrison Dow
W Tianyu (Bill) Lin	W+Resign	B Kenny Jin
B Brady Zhang	B+Resign	W Zixuan Gao

Boston	1–2	Toronto, ON
B Huiren Yang	W+8.5	W Kaining Huang
W Xiaodi Huang	W+6.5	B Leo Tan
B Jate Greene	W+Resign	W Guanyu Song

Denver	1–2	Chicago
B Matthew Harwit	W+Resign	W Calvin Sun
W Yan Jin	W+Resign	B Sungsoo Kim
B Bowen Zhang	W+4.5	W Cheuk To Tsui

New York City	3–0	Ottawa
B Zhaonian Chen	B+Resign	W Jianming Hao
W Alexander Qi	W+Resign	B Hanxi Zhang
B Ryan Li	B+Resign	W Yingzhi Chen

=== Round 3 ===
February 18, 2024

Boston	0-2	Canwa Vancouver 1
B Huiren Yang	W+Resign	W Henry Yu
W Xiaodi Huang	vs	B Tianyu (Bill) Lin
B Jate Greene	W+Resign	W Brady Zhang

Seattle	2-1	Denver
B Harrison Dow	B+3.5	W Matthew Harwit
W Kenny Jin	W+Resign	B Yan Jin
B Zixuan Gao	W+Resign	W Bowen Zhang

Toronto, ON	0-3	New York City
B Kaining Huang	W+Resign	W Zhaonian Chen
W Leo Tan	B+Resign	B Alexander Qi
B Guanyu Song	W+Resign	W Ryan Li

Chicago	2-1	Ottawa
B Albert Yen	B+0.5	W Jun Li
W Sungsoo Kim	W+Resign	B Hanxi Zhang
B Cheuk To Tsui	W+Resign	W Yingzhi Chen

=== Round 4 ===
March 10, 2024

Canwa Vancouver 1	3-0	Denver
B Henry Yu	B+Resign	W Matthew Harwit
W Tianyu (Bill) Lin	W+Resign	B Yan Jin
B Brady Zhang	B+Time	W Bowen Zhang

New York City	2-0	Boston
B Zhaonian Chen	B+6.5	W Huiren Yang
W Alexander Qi	W+2.5	B Xiaodi Huang
B Ryan Li	vs	W Jate Greene

Ottawa	0-3	Seattle
B Jianming Hao	W+14.5	W Harrison Dow
W Hanxi Zhang	B+Resign	B Kenny Jin
B Yingzhi Chen	W+Resign	W Haichen Zhu

Chicago	0-3	Toronto, ON
B Albert Yen	W+6.5	W Kaining Huang
W Sungsoo Kim	B+Resign	B Leo Tan
B Cheuk To Tsui	W+Resign	W Guanyu Song

=== Round 5 ===
April 7, 2024

New York City	1–2	Canwa Vancouver 1
B Zhaonian Chen	W+Resign	W Henry Yu
W Alexander Qi	B+Resign	B Tianyu (Bill) Lin
B Ryan Li	B+Resign	W Brady Zhang

Denver	3–0	Ottawa
B Matthew Harwit	B+Resign	W Jianming Hao
W Yan Jin	W+Resign	B Hanxi Zhang
B Bowen Zhang	B+Resign	W Yingzhi Chen

Boston	1-2	Chicago
B Huiren Yang	W+8.5	W Albert Yen
W Xiaodi Huang	W+Resign	B Sungsoo Kim
B Jate Greene	W+Forfeit	W Cheuk To Tsui

Seattle 1	0-2	Toronto, ON
B Harrison Dow	W+Resign	W Kaining Huang
W Kenny Jin	vs	B Leo Tan
B Zixuan Gao	W+Resign	W Guanyu Song

=== Round 6 ===
April 28, 2024

Canwa Vancouver 1	3-0	Ottawa
B Henry Yu	B+53.5	W Jianming Hao
W Tianyu (Bill) Lin	W+Resign	B Xianyu Li
B Brady Zhang	B+14.5	W Yingzhi Chen

Chicago	1-2	New York City
B Albert Yen	B+0.5	W Zhaonian Chen
W Calvin Sun	B+Resign	B Alexander Qi
B Cheuk To Tsui	W+Resign	W Ryan Li

Toronto, ON	2–1	Denver
B Kaining Huang	B+Resign	W Matthew Harwit
W Leo Tan	B+Forfeit	B Yan Jin
B Guanyu Song	B+10.5	W Bowen Zhang

Seattle	1-2	Boston
B Harrison Dow	W+Resign	W Huiren Yang
W Kenny Jin	B+4.5	B Xiaodi Huang
B Zixuan Gao	B+Resign	W Jate Greene

=== Round 7 ===
May 19, 2024

Chicago	2-1	Canwa Vancouver 1
B Albert Yen	B+Forfeit	W Henry Yu
W Sungsoo Kim	W+9.5	B Tianyu (Bill) Lin
B Cheuk To Tsui	W+Resign	W Brady Zhang

Ottawa	1-2	Toronto, ON
B Jianming Hao	B+Forfeit	W Kaining Huang
W Xianyu Li	B+Forfeit	B Leo Tan
B Yingzhi Chen	W+Resign	W Guanyu Song

New York City	2-1	Seattle
B Zhaonian Chen	W+9.5	W HaiChen Zhu
W Alexander Qi	W+11.5	B Kenny Jin
B Ryan Li	B+Resign	W Zixuan Gao

Denver	1-2	Boston
B Matthew Harwit	W+Resign	W Huiren Yang
W Yan Jin	B+Resign	B Ke Lu
B Bowen Zhang	B+Resign	W Jate Greene

=== Standing ===
Team	Rank
New York City	1
Toronto	2
Canwa Vancouver 1	3
Chicago	4
Seattle 1	5

== The Thirteenth AGA City League A in 2025 ==
AGA City League 2025 is played between January 26 2025 and June 1 2025.

=== Round 1 ===
January 26, 2025

Vancouver, BC	3–0	Boston
B Henry Yu	B+Resign	W Siyu Chen
W Tianyu (Bill) Lin	W+Resign	B Forest Song
B Brady Zhang	B+7.5	W Yanjun Liu

Chicago	2–1	Toronto S. Avalanche
B Albert Yen	B+6.5	W Ivan Lo
W Maxwell Chen	B+Resign	B Leo Tan
B Sungsoo Kim	B+Resign	W Hongyi Li

Seattle	2–1	Denver
B Difei Pan	B+Resign	W Bowen Zhang
W Kenny Jin	B+Resign	B Yan Jin
B Zixuan Gao	B+21.5	W Nicole Chen

San Diego	1–2	New York City
B Yiyao Hu	W+Resign	W Ryan Li
W Shang Zhou	W+1.5	B Alan Huang
B Moxuan Liu	W+Resign	W Alexander Qi

=== Round 2 ===
February 16, 2025

Vancouver, BC	3 – 0	Denver
B Henry Yu	B+Resign	W Bowen Zhang
B Tianyu (Bill) Lin	B+Resign	W Yan Jin
B Brady Zhang	B+Resign	W Nicole Chen

Toronto S. Avalanche	1–2	New York City
W Ivan Lo	B+Resign	B Ryan Li
B Leo Tan	B+Resign	W Alan Huang
W Hongyi Li	B+Time	B Alexander Qi

Boston	0–3	San Diego
B Siyu Chen	W+Resign	W Yiyao Hu
W Forest Song	B+Resign	B Shang Zhou
B Yanjun Liu	W+Resign	W Moxuan Liu

Chicago	1–2	Seattle
W Dadu Chen	W+4.5	B Difei Pan
B Ruixuan Liu	W+Resign	W Kenny Jin
W Sungsoo Kim	B+Forfeit	B Zixuan Gao

=== Round 3 ===
March 9, 2025

Vancouver, BC	2–1	Seattle
W Henry Yu	B+Resign	B Difei Pan
B Tianyu (Bill) Lin	B+Resign	W Kenny Jin
W Brady Zhang	W+Resign	B Zixuan Gao

San Diego	1–2	Chicago
B Yiyao Hu	W+Resign	W Albert Yen
W Shang Zhou	W+Resign	B Dadu Chen
B Moxuan Liu	W+Resign	W Sungsoo Kim

New York City	3–0	Boston
B Ryan Li	B+Forfeit	W Noah Chen
W Alan Huang	W+Resign	B Forest Song
B Alexander Qi	B+Resign	W Yanjun Liu

Denver	1–2	Toronto S. Avalanche
B Bowen Zhang	W+Resign	W Ivan Lo
W Yan Jin	W+Resign	B Leo Tan
B Nicole Chen	W+24.5	W Hongyi Li

=== Round 4 ===
March 30, 2025

Toronto S. Avalanche	1–2	Vancouver, BC
B Ivan Lo	W+Resign	W Henry Yu
W Leo Tan	B+Resign	B Tianyu (Bill) Lin
B Hongyi Li	B+13.5	W Brady Zhang

Denver	3–0	Boston
B Bowen Zhang	B+Forfeit	W Siyu Chen
W Yan Jin	W+Resign	B Forest Song
B Matthew Harwit	B+5.5	W Yanjun Liu

New York City	2-1	Chicago
B Ryan Li	B+Resign	W Ruixuan Liu
W Alan Huang	B+Forfeit	B Maxwell Chen
B Alexander Qi	B+Resign	W Sungsoo Kim

San Diego	2–1	Seattle
B Yiyao Hu	W+Resign	W Difei Pan
W Shang Zhou	W+11.5	B Kenny Jin
B Evan Tan	B+Resign	W Zixuan Gao

=== Round 5 ===
April 20, 2025

San Diego	0–3	Vancouver, BC
B Evan Tan	W+1.5	W Henry Yu
B Shang Zhou	W+8.5	W Tianyu (Bill) Lin
B Aiyang Lu	W+Resign	W Brady Zhang

Seattle	0–2	New York City
W Difei Pan	B+Resign	B Ryan Li
W Harrison Dow	B+Resign	B Alan Huang
B Zixuan Gao	W+Resign	W Alexander Qi

Chicago	2–1	Denver
B Albert Yen	B+34.5	W Bowen Zhang
W Maxwell Chen	B+Resign	B Yan Jin
B Sungsoo Kim	B+Resign	W Nicole Chen

Boston	0–3	Toronto S. Avalanche
B Siyu Chen	W+Forfeit	W Ivan Lo
W Forest Song	B+Resign	B Leo Tan
B Yanjun Liu	W+Resign	W Hongyi Li

=== Round 6 ===
May 11, 2025

Chicago	1–2	Vancouver, BC
B Dadu Chen	B+Forfeit	W Henry Yu
B Ruixuan Liu	W+Resign	W Tianyu (Bill) Lin
B Sungsoo Kim	W+6.5	W Brady Zhang

Boston	1–2	Seattle
B Siyu Chen	W+Resign	W Difei Pan
W Forest Song	B+Resign	B Harrison Dow
B Yanjun Liu	B+Forfeit	W HaiChen Zhu

Toronto S. Avalanche	3–0	San Diego
B Ivan Lo	B+Resign	W Yiyao Hu
W Leo Tan	W+Resign	B Shang Zhou
B Hongyi Li	B+6.5	W Moxuan Liu

Denver	0–3	New York City
B Bowen Zhang	W+Resign	W Ryan Li
W Yan Jin	B+Resign	B Alan Huang
B Nicole Chen	W+Resign	W Alexander Qi

=== Round 7 ===
June 1 2025

Vancouver, BC	0–3	New York City
B Henry Yu	W+Resign	W Ryan Li
B Tianyu (Bill) Lin	W+6.5	W Alan Huang
B Brady Zhang	W+Resign	W Alexander Qi

Denver	0–3	San Diego
B Bowen Zhang	W+Resign	W Yiyao Hu
W Yan Jin	B+Resign	B Shang Zhou
B Nicole Chen	W+Resign	W Moxuan Liu

Toronto S. Avalanche	2–1	Seattle
B Ivan Lo	B+8.5	W Difei Pan
W Leo Tan	B+Resign	B HaiChen Zhu
B Hongyi Li	B+Resign	W Harrison Dow

Boston	0–3	Chicago
B Siyu Chen	W+Resign	W Albert Yen
W Forest Song	B+Resign	B Dadu Chen
B Yanjun Liu	W+Resign	W Sungsoo Kim

== The Fourteenth AGA City League A in 2026 ==
AGA City League 2026 is played between January 4, 2026 and June 21, 2026.

=== AGA City League A 2026 ===
==== Round 1 ====
January 4, 2026

New York City 7	1–3	Toronto Small Avalanche
B Xingzhi Shen	W+Resign	W Guanyu Song
B Alan Huang	B+Resign	W Leo Tan
B Jeremy Chiu	W+Resign	W Hongyi Li
W Alisa Wu	B+Resign	B Ivan Lo

New York Institute of Go	3–1	Vancouver, BC
B Alexander Qi	W+Resign	W Tianyu (Bill) Lin
W Ryan Li	W+Resign	B Henry Yu
B Zirui Song	B+Resign	W Brady Zhang
W Ziyang (Matthew) Hu	W+9.5	B Victor Wu

San Diego	3–1	Canwa Vancouver 3
B Calvin Sun	B+Resign	W Xuejun Peng
W Yiyao Hu	B+Resign	B Kevin Wang
B Hongkui Zheng	B+Resign	W Zhiqiang Zhang
W Shang Zhou	W+Resign	B Roy Tong

Chicago	3–1	Seattle 1
B Albert Yen	B+Resign	W Yan Jin
W Sungsoo Kim	W+Resign	B Brandon Zhou
B Jiehui Kwa	B+8.5	W Michael Wanek
W Dadu Chen	B+Resign	B Zixuan Gao

==== Round 2 ====
February 1, 2026

Canwa Vancouver 3	2–2	Seattle 1
B Yitao Zhu	W+6.5	W Yan Jin
W Kevin Wang	W+Resign	B Brandon Zhou
B Xuejun Peng	B+9.5	W Michael Wanek
W Roy Tong	B+Resign	B Zixuan Gao

New York Institute of Go	3–1	New York City 7
B Alexander Qi	W+Resign	W Xingzhi Shen
W Ryan Li	W+Resign	B Alan Huang
B Zirui Song	B+Resign	W Jeremy Chiu
W Ziyang (Matthew) Hu	B W+Resign	Alisa Wu
