= Li Daichun =

Chinese Go player (born 1977)

Personal information
- Native name: 李岱春 (Chinese); Lǐ Dàichūn (Pinyin)
- Full name: Li Daichun
- Born: December 12, 1977 (age 48) Nantong, China

Sport
- Rank: 8 dan (Amateur)

Li Daichun (Chinese: 李岱春; pinyin: Lǐ Dàichūn; born December 12, 1977, in Nantong) is a Go player. He is an 8 dan (Amateur) player from China. He has won many titles. He is the winner of the World Amateur Go Championship in 2001.
