= American Go Association =

American organization to promote the board game of Go

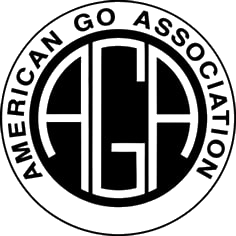
- Formation: 1935
- Type: Sports association
- Members: International Go Federation
- Official language: English
- President: Gurujeet Khalsa
- Vice-President: Chris Kirschner
- Website: www.usgo.org

The American Go Association (AGA) was founded in 1935, to promote the board game of Go in the United States.

Founded by chess master Edward Lasker and some friends at Chumley's restaurant in New York City, the AGA is one of the oldest Western Go associations.

The AGA publishes a weekly online newsletter that reaches more than 13,000 subscribers worldwide, The American Go E-Journal, and an annual Yearbook; maintains a national rating system; organizes an annual national event, The US Go Congress; selects North American representatives in international tournaments; and provides support to its members and chapters as they promote Go in their communities.

Events for youth have also been established, including tournaments and an annual AGA youth summer camp that features instruction from professional players. The AGA has developed a set of rules that attempts to reconcile difference between "area"-based rule sets and "territory"-based rule sets, and participates actively in an international committee, trying to establish a unified worldwide set of rules.

As a member of the International Go Federation, the AGA is the official organization responsible for managing and promoting Go in the United States.

== Publicity and exposure ==
President Barack Obama's administration contacted the AGA for an American-made Go board etched with the presidential seal and signature, the gift given on November 17, 2009 to China's President Hu Jintao.

Whilst the US Go community were buzzing about getting exposure, and the BBC covered the event on its Newsnight programme, the US press did not really pick up the story, except the Chapel Hill Herald, the local paper where the board was made.

The association and its aim of finding the first professional American Go player were heavily featured in the 2018 movie The Surrounding Game.

== Professional system ==
In December 2011, The AGA partnered with the Korea Baduk Association and the Korean Go server Tygem to promote a new professional players system for the US. Tygem agreed to sponsor and be the broadcaster for the 2012 professional certification tournament. In addition, several Asian professional tournaments have invited AGA professionals to compete.

In 2021, the AGA transferred its professional system to a new governing organization, the North American Go Federation, formed by the AGA and the Canadian Go Association. The certification system is open to both US citizens and Canadian citizens via invitation pending the residency requirement and qualifying as a finalist.

=== Professional players ===
Professional status in Go is customarily for life. The dates below indicate when the players were granted professional status.

- 2012: Andy Liu 1p and Gansheng Shi 1p
- 2014: Calvin Sun 2p
- 2015: Ryan Li 3p
- 2016: Eric Lui 1p
- 2022: Kevin Yang 1p and Alexander Qi 1p
- 2023: Michael Chen 2p
- 2024: Bill Lin 1p
- 2025: Guanyu Song 1p
- 2026: Qiyuo Wu 1p

== AGA City League ==
The City League is an AGA tournament where teams from different cities play each other in a league system, on the Pandanet server in the AGA room.

The teams consist of up to five players, out of whom three are selected to play in each round.

The current rules are listed on Pandanet.

== See also ==
- International Go Federation
- List of professional Go tournaments
- Nihon Ki-in (Japanese Go Association)
- Hanguk Kiwon (Korean Go Association)
- Zhongguo Qiyuan (Chinese Go Association)
- Taiwan Chi-Yuan (Taiwanese Go Association)
- European Go Federation
