= The Surrounding Game =

2017 documentary

The Surrounding Game is a 2017 documentary about the game of Go.

The film was directed by Will Lockhart and Cole Pruitt, who conceived of the project at Brown University. Lockhart and Pruitt also founded the American Collegiate Go Association. The Surrounding Game follows the tournament played to establish America's first professional Go player. It was filmed over the course of a four-year period in several countries, following the paths of several players in the tournament:

- Andy Liu, the tournament's eventual winner and first American professional player
- Ben Lockhart, director Will Lockhart's brother, an expat American studying Go in Korea
- Curtis Tang, a child prodigy
- Gansheng Shi, a Canadian Go player and second American Go professional

The film also features Go Seigen in a short segment filmed only a year or so before his death.
