= World Amateur Go Championship =

International tournament for amateur Go players

The World Amateur Go Championship (WAGC) is an international tournament for amateur Go players, held once a year since 1979. The organising body is the International Go Federation (IGF).

Each participating country sends one player, although in the beginning of the contest there were multiple players from the stronger Go Countries (e.g. China, Japan, South Korea); in 2007 there were 68 participants.

Some of the participants have gone on to become top Go professionals.

== Past champions ==
The names are ordered as Given name and Surname.

Year	Winner	2nd	3rd
1979	Wei-Ping Nie (China)	Zu-De Chen (China)	Jia-Rui Chen (China)
1980	Fumiaki Imamura (Japan)	Zu-De Chen (China)	Hajime Yasunaga (Japan)
1981	Zhen-Zhong Shao (China)	Xiao-Chun Ma (China)	Bunsho Murakami (Japan)
1982	Da-Yuan Cao (China)	Jin-Ha Yang (China)	Hironori Hirata (Japan)
1983	Xiao-Chun Ma (China)	Hiroshi Miura (Japan)	Fumiaki Imamura (Japan)
1984	Qun Wang (China)	Chang-Hyuk Yoo (South Korea)	Hironori Hirata (Japan)
1985	Jian-Hong Wang (China)	Jia-Rui Chen (Hong Kong)	Yasuro Kikuchi (Japan)
1986	Jia-Rui Chen (Hong Kong)	Yasuro Kikuchi (Japan)	Xue-Lin Song (China)
1987	Fumiaki Imamura (Japan)	Bin Yu (China)	Gwan-Cheol Lee (South Korea)
1988	Wen-Dong Zhang (China)	Fumiaki Imamura (Japan)	Ronald Schlemper (Netherlands)
1988	Wen-Dong Zhang (China)	Fumiaki Imamura (Japan)	Chul-Joong Kim (South Korea)
1989	Ze-Wu Che (China)	Wen-He Cai (Taiwan)	Hironori Hirata (Japan)
1990	Hao Chang (China)	Quan-Wuk An (South Korea)	Hiroshi Miura (Japan)
1991	Fumiaki Imamura (Japan)	Xia-Nyu Xia (Taiwan)	Ronald Schlemper (Netherlands)
1992	Yasuro Kikuchi (Japan)	Young-Man Lee (South Korea)	Qi-Yu Han (China)
1993	Yi-Guo Sun (China)	Soon-Joo Seo (South Korea)	Hironori Hirata (Japan)
1994	Satoshi Hiraoka (Japan)	Chun-Hsun Chou (Taiwan)	Chun Wang (China)
1995	Hironori Hirata (Japan)	Hong-Yi Shi (China)	Ying Kan (Hong Kong)
1996	Jun Liu (China)	Hironori Hirata (Japan)	Yong-Man Yi (South Korea)
1997	Jun Liu (China)	Hideyuki Sakai (Japan)	Yeong-Sam Mun (North Korea)
1998	Ch'an-U Kim (South Korea)	Satoshi Hiraoka (Japan)	Wen-Dong Zhao (China)
1999	Chae-Seong Yu (South Korea)	Hideyuki Sakai (Japan)	Pong-Il Ri (North Korea)
2000	Hideyuki Sakai (Japan)	Ho-Kil Pak (North Korea)	Maleun-Saem Hong (South Korea)
2001	Dai-Chun Li (China)	Moriei Kanazawa (Japan)	Dong Ming Liu (Australia)
2002	Li Fu (China)	Maleun-Saem Hong (South Korea)	Yasuro Kikuchi (Japan)
2003	Not held due to SARS outbreak.		
2004	Kang-Wook Lee (South Korea)	You-Zheng Lai (Taiwan)	Li Fu (China)
2005	Yu-Qing Hu (China)	Tae-Weon Cho (North Korea)	Cheng-Rui Yu (Taiwan)
2006	Satoshi Hiraoka (Japan)	Weixing Tang (China)	Tae-Weon Cho (North Korea)
2007	Zi-Teng Shan (China)	Tong-Ha U (South Korea)	Hironobu Mori (Japan)
2008	Sung-Bong Ha (South Korea)	Yu-Zheng Guo (China)	Fernando Aguilar (Argentina)
2009	Yu-Ging Hu (China)	Shin-Hwan Yu (South Korea)	Nai-San Chan (Hong Kong)
2010	Hong-Suk Song (South Korea)	Chen Wang (China)	Tae-Weon Cho (North Korea)
2011	Baoxiang Bai (China)	Woo-Soo Choi (South Korea)	Eric Lui (United States)
2012	Zhi-Jian Qiao (China)	Hyun-Joon Lee (South Korea)	Cheng-Hsun Chen (Taiwan)
2013	Hyun-Jae Choi (South Korea)	Yu-Qing Hu (China)	Artem Kachanovskyi (Ukraine)
2014	Yi-Tien Chan (Taiwan)	Tae-woong Wei (South Korea)	Ruoran Wang (China)
2015	Changhun Kim (South Korea)	Aohua Hu (China)	Jyun-Fu Lai (Taiwan)
2016	Baoxiang Bai (China)	Kibaek Kim (South Korea)	CHia-Cheng Hsu (Taiwan)
2017	Baoxiang Bai (China)	Sang-bin Lee (South Korea)	Yu-Cheng Lai (Taiwan)
2018	Yi-Tien Chan (Taiwan)	Sangcheon Kim (South Korea)	Chen Wang (China)
2019	Chen Wang (China)	Jaesung Lee (South Korea)	Nai-San Chan (Hong Kong)
2020	Not held due to COVID-19 pandemic.		
2021	Tianfang Ma (China)	I-Tien Chan (Taiwan)	Dabeen Kim (South Korea)
2022	Held online (Fox server).		
2023	Jung Seon Kim (South Korea)	Chukun Yang (China)	Yu-Cheng Lai (Taiwan)
2024	Baoxiang Bai (China)	Jung Seon Kim (South Korea)	Minoru Ozeki (Japan)
2025	Tianfang Ma (China)	Minoru Ozeki (Japan)	Sawoo Kim (South Korea)
2026	Yu Fu (China)	Hyo Ka (Japan)	Lukas Podpera (Czech Republic)

== See also ==
- Go competitions
- Go players
- List of world Go champions
- List of world championships in mind sports
