= Taiwan Chi Yuan Culture Foundation =

Professional Go association in Taiwan

The Taiwan Chi Yuan Culture Foundation (Chinese: 台灣棋院文化基金會; pinyin: Táiwān Qíyuàn Wénhuà Jījīnhuì), also known as the Taiwan Chi Yuan or Taiwan Go Association, is a professional Go association in Taiwan. The Taiwan Qiyuan was created on March 4, 2000 with initial funding provided by Mr. Weng Ming Xian (Chinese: 翁明顯; pinyin: Wēng Míng Xiǎn) who also served as the first chairman of the association. The chairman is Chen Guoxing. It ranks professionals and runs professional qualification exams for players in Taiwan.

== See also ==
- International Go Federation
- List of professional Go tournaments
- Nihon Ki-in
- Kansai Ki-in
- Hanguk Kiwon
- Zhongguo Qiyuan
- Hoensha
