= World Youth Go Championship =

Go tournament

- Full name: World Youth Go Championship
- Started: 1984
- Sponsors: Ing Wei'Chi Foundation

The World Youth Go Championship (WYGC) is a Go tournament that has been held annually since 1984 making it the second longest running amateur Go tournament in the world.

This event is sponsored by the Ing Foundation, and therefore Ing's rules are used. A number of strong participants in the World Youth Go Championship eventually became World Champions, such as Chang Hao, Gu Li, Lee Sedol.

There is a Junior division for players aged under 12, and a Senior division for players aged under 18.

== Past results ==
Event	Year	Location	Junior Winner	Senior Winner	US Junior Rep	US Senior Rep	Canada Senior Rep	Singapore Junior Rep	Singapore Senior Rep	Malaysia Junior Rep	Malaysia Senior Rep
1st	1984	Taipei, Taiwan	金荣桓(韩)	N/A	Janice Kim	N/A	NA				
2nd	1985	Taipei, Taiwan	孔柄柱(韩)	N/A	Janice Kim	N/A	NA		陈德胜		
3rd	1986	Taipei, Taiwan	李相勋(韩)	N/A	Tony Pa	N/A	NA		卓伟俊		
4th	1987	Hong Kong, China	余平(中)	N/A	Tony Pa/Alan Chen	N/A	NA		陈德胜		
5th	1988	Paris, France	Chang Hao	N/A	David Mechner/Tony Pa	N/A	NA		林国荣		
6th	1989	Singapore	夏衔誉(台)	金万树(韩)	Lisa Chen/Irene Chen	?	?		王炳义，杨友福，王炳川		
7th	1990	Guilin, China	李君凯(中)	夏衔誉(台)	Lisa Chen/Irene Chen	?	?		许伟良		
8th	1991	Ningbo, China	韩文德(韩)	Wang Lei	David Haff	?	?	沈凯	洪庆杰		
9th	1992	San José, USA	Lin Chih-han	Zhou Heyang	None	Joey Hung / David Zeng / Yuan Zhou	Vincent Wong	胡颖汉	黄世文		
10th	1993	Ottawa, Canada	Wang Yao	An Cho-young	John Lee	?	?	Mai Kaojie	Tan Yee Fan		Teng Boon Ping
11th	1994	San Francisco, USA	Gu Li	安达勋(韩)	?	?	?	罗敏铭	麦考杰		
12th	1995	Amsterdam	李秀勇(韩)	Huang Yizhong	Bellamy Liu	James Chien	?	Cai Geng Yang	Tan Yee Fan (4th)		
13th	1996	Seoul, Korea	Park Yeong-hun	Hu Yaoyu	Eric Lui	Janathan Wang	?				
14th	1997	Nantou County, Taiwan	Lee Young-gu	刘熙(中)	Jesse Chao	Janathan Wang	?	Cai Geng Yang	Tan Jia Cheng		
15th	1998	Guiyang, China	李康(中)	Liu Xing	Eric Lui	Janathan Wang	?	Ong Sze Han	Loh Min Ming		
16th	1999	Singapore	景石(中)	彭荃(中)	Eric Lui	Janathan Wang	?	Chen Yu Zhong	Tan Jia Cheng		
17th	2000	Prague, Czech Republic	Tong-yun Kang	Lei Wang	Eric Liu	Matthew Curran	?	Alden Cheng	Loh Min Ming		
18th	2001	Maui, USA	Hyeong-chin Kweon	Hyeong-hwan Kim	Curtis Tang	Eric Lui	?				
19th	2002	Bangkok, Thailand	Zhou Ruiyang	Kang Li	Mozheng Guan	-	?				
20th	2003	Shanghai, China	강유택	Chen Yaoye	?	?	?				
21st	2004	Vancouver, Canada	Yulin Tong	Gu Lingyi	Curtis Tang	Mozheng guan	?	Lee Chi-Chien	Lai Wei		
22nd	2005	Barcelona, Spain	Hyeon Na	Hao Zhang	Calvin Sun	Sichen Zhong	Hao Zhang	Lee Jun Wei	Ong Siong Hwai		
23rd	2006	Shenzhen, China	Hyeon Na	Peng Liyao	Calvin Sun	Curtis Tang	?	Chou Zi Long	Zhang Xiang		
24th	2007	Waltham, USA	Seung-yu Han	Xingwen Liao	Calvin Sun	William Zhou	?				
25th	2008	Guiyang, China	Ke Jie	Mi Yuting	Calvin Sun	William Zhou	?				
26th	2009	Changzhi, China	Yang Dingxin	Li Xuanhao	Andrew Lu	Calvin Sun	Andrew Huang	Kwa Jie Hui	Loh Yu Xiang		
27th	2010	Penghu Island, Taiwan	Li Qincheng	Han Seung Joo	Kevin Fang	Calvin Sun	Andrew Huang	Yue Yi Fei (4th)	Kwa Jie Hui		
28th	2011	Bucharest, Romania	Yuanpei Liao	Ke Jie	Aaron Ye	Vincent Zhuang	Amira Song	Yue Yi Fei	Kwa Jie Hui		
29th	2012	Luoyang, China	Wang Shi Yi	Li Qincheng	Aaron Ye	Calvin Sun	Bill Lin	Ho Fei Yang	Yue Yi Fei		
30th	2013	Prague, Czech Republic	Seki Kotaro	Wang Zejin	Jeremy Chiu	Andrew Lu	Amira Song	Lucas Rahardja	Xi Yue		
31st	2014	Kuala Lumpur, Malaysia	Huang Mingyu	Xu Jiayang	Brandon Zhou	Albert Yen	David Lu	Brian Lee Jun Xiang	Zhu Yu Hao		
32nd	2015	Harbin, China	Xinghao Wang	Weiqing Li	Ary Cheng	Jeremy Chiu	Melissa Zhang	Lucas Yeo Chun Teng	Lucas Rahardja		
33rd	2016	Tokyo, Japan	Yeom Jiwoong	Jiang Qirun	Matthew Cheng	Aaron Ye	Kevin Wan	Gao Ji Yang	Ho Fei Yang		
34th	2017	Chiangmai, Thailand	Chunhui Wang	Xinghao Wang	Frederick Bao	Gabriella Su	Kevin Wan	NA	Chen Yilin		Lee Shou Wei
35th	2018	Bacharach, Germany	Xiào Zébīn	Lǐ Zéruì	Elwin Li	Melissa Cao	Henry Chen	NA	Gao Ji Yang	Goh Gan Wei	Lee Shou Kai
36th	2019	Kuala Lumpur, Maylasia	JUNG Junwoo (South Korea)	YANG YuJun (South Korea)	Alexander Qi	Ary Cheng		Chen Yu Qi	Lucas Yeo Chun Teng		
37th	2022	Online(Due to Covid 19)	Kim Hayun (South Korea)	Xu YiDi				Chen Yi Han (3rd)	Lucas Lee Jing Tai		
38th	2023	Singapore	Wenzheng Zhang	Shunbo Wang	Eric Yang	Tony Yang	Ben Gong	Hu Ming Xuan (4th)	Keddrick Lin Han		Kwee Song He
39th	2024	Vatra Dornei, Romania	Zhang Yimiao (China)	Kim Tae Heon (South Korea)							
40th	2025	Kuala Lumpur, Malaysia	Kim Jeong Hyun	Alexander Qi	Dennis Kuvshynov	Alexander Qi					

== See also ==
- Mind sport
