= International Go Federation =

Organization for the game of Go

- Formation: March 18, 1982
- Type: Sports federation
- Headquarters: Tokyo, Japan
- Members: List of Go organizations
- Official language: English
- President: Yōkō Takemiya
- Website: intergofed.org

The International Go Federation (IGF) is an international organization that connects the various national Go federations around the world.

== Role ==
The role of the IGF is to promote the sport of Go throughout the world, promote amicable relations among members and improve world go organization. It does so by carrying out the following activities:

- Organizing the World Amateur Go Championship and other international Go tournaments;
- Publishing and distributing to members up-to-date information on world Go activities, through bulletins or on the IGF website;
- Other activities pertaining to the international development of Go.

== Policies ==
The IGF is an apolitical and non-religious organization, and strives to promote fair play amongst all players.

== History ==
The Japan Go Association organized the first World Go Amateur Championship in Japan, in 1979. Many of the top Go players from around the world and representatives from the major National Go Associations attended the event. Its success led to the founding of the International Go Federation on March 18, 1982, with Shizuo Asada presiding over the original 29 founding members.

On April 7, 2006, the IGF became a member of the General Association of International Sports Federations (GAISF).

The IGF is one of the founding member of the IMSA (International Mind Sports Association).

The IGF organizes the yearly World Amateur Go Championship, which attracts over 65 countries.

== Tournaments ==
Sources:

- List of professional Go tournaments
- World Amateur Go Championship
- International Amateur Pair Go Championship
- International Amateur Baduk Championship
- World Youth Go Championship
- European Go Championship
- European Pair Go Championship
- Asian Go Championship
- Pan American Go Championship
- Ibero American Go Championship

== Members ==
As of December 2017 the IGF has 77 member nations: 39 in Europe, 18 in Asia, 15 in the Americas, 3 in Africa and 2 in Oceania. It also has five Association Members, which cover multiple countries: the World Pair Go Association, the Federación Iberoamericana de Go, the European Go Federation, the Ing Changk Wei-Chi Education Foundation and the Asian Go Federation.

77 Nations in 2023:

- 39 in Europe: ARM, AUT, AZE, BLR, BEL, BIH, BUL, CRO, CYP, CZE, DEN, FIN, FRA, GEO, GER, HUN, ISL, IRL, ISR, ITA, KAZ, LAT, LTU, LUX, NED, NOR, POL, POR, ROU, RUS, SRB, SVK, SLO, ESP, SWE, SUI, TUR, UKR, GBR
- 18 in Asia: BRU, CHN, TPE, HKG, IND, INA, IRI, JPN, MAC, MAS, MGL, NEP, PRK, PHI, SIN, KOR, THA, VIE
- 15 in Americas: ARG, BRA, CAN, CHI, COL, CRC, CUB, ECU, GUA, MEX, PAN, PER, URU, USA, VEN
- 3 in Africa: MAD, MAR, RSA
- 2 in Oceania: AUS, NZL

5 Association Members:

- World Pair Go Association
- Federación Iberoamericana de Go
- European Go Federation
- Ing Changk Wei-Chi Education Foundation
- Asian Go Federation

== IGF presidents ==
Presidents of the International Go Federation
Years	President	Notes
1982–1997	Shizuo Asada	Professional Go player and founding president of the IGF
1997–2001	Fumio Watanabe	
2001–2004	Matsuo Toshimitsu	
2004	Masao Kato	Professional 9-dan Go player — taken ill and died at the end of 2004
2005–2007	Norio Kudo	Professional 9-dan Go player
2007–2009	Hiromu Okabe	Chairman of the board of directors for the Nihon Ki-in, president of the Denso Corporation
2009–2010	Otake Hideo	Chairman of the board of directors for the Nihon Ki-in
2010–2012	Chang Zhenming	Vice-chairman and president of CITIC Group
2012–2014	Koichiro Matsuura	President of World Pair Go Association and former Director-General of UNESCO
2014–2016	Seokhyun Hong	Chairman of the Korea Baduk Association, president of the Joongang Media Network
from 2016	Chang Zhenming	President of CITIC Group

== See also ==
- List of international sport federations
