= List of software developed at universities =

Software projects developed at universities

This is a list of software developed at universities including software, programming languages, operating systems, web browsers, computer graphics tools, database systems, scientific computing software, or machine learning frameworks that originated or are maintained by university research, students, or academic laboratories.

== Artificial intelligence and machine learning ==
- ACT-R – cognitive architecture for modeling human cognition (Carnegie Mellon)
- AlexNet – influential convolutional neural network architecture for image recognition (Toronto)
- Apache MXNet – deep learning framework (University of Washington)
- Apache OpenNLP – natural language processing toolkit started by Edinburgh graduate students (Edinburgh)
- Automated Mathematician – artificial intelligence system for discovering mathematical concepts (Stanford)
- Caffe – deep learning framework (UC Berkeley)
- Cepheus – poker-playing artificial intelligence program (Alberta)
- Chinook – checkers-playing artificial intelligence program (Alberta)
- Claudico – artificial intelligence poker program (Carnegie Mellon)
- CMU Sphinx – speech recognition system (Carnegie Mellon)
- Dendral – early expert system for chemical analysis (Stanford)
- ELIZA – early natural-language processing chatbot (MIT)
- ELKI – data mining and clustering framework (LMU Munich)
- Eurisko – heuristic discovery and learning system (Carnegie Mellon and Stanford)
- GATE – natural language processing and text-mining framework (Sheffield)
- GraphLab – distributed machine learning and graph computation framework (Carnegie Mellon)
- HTK – hidden Markov model toolkit for speech recognition (Cambridge)
- INTERNIST-I – medical expert system for computer-assisted diagnosis (Pittsburgh)
- Kaldi – speech recognition toolkit started at a Johns Hopkins workshop (Johns Hopkins)
- KNIME – data analytics and machine learning platform (Konstanz)
- LIBSVM – support vector machine software library (National Taiwan University)
- Libratus – artificial intelligence poker program (Carnegie Mellon)
- MALLET – machine learning and natural language processing toolkit (UMass Amherst)
- Mamba – deep learning architecture for sequence modeling (Carnegie Mellon and Princeton)
- Massive Online Analysis – data stream mining and machine learning framework (Waikato)
- mlpack – machine learning software library (Georgia Tech)
- Moses – statistical machine translation system (Edinburgh)
- MovieLens – recommender-system research platform (Minnesota)
- MYCIN – medical expert system for diagnosing bacterial infections (Stanford)
- Natural Language Toolkit – natural language processing toolkit (Penn)
- Never-Ending Language Learning – semantic machine learning system (Carnegie Mellon)
- Open Mind Common Sense – commonsense artificial intelligence project (MIT)
- Orange – data mining and machine learning software suite (Ljubljana)
- PARRY – early natural-language chatbot (Stanford)
- Polaris – poker-playing artificial intelligence program (Alberta)
- RapidMiner – data science and machine learning platform originating as YALE (TU Dortmund)
- SGLang – structured generation and LLM serving framework (UC Berkeley, Stanford, Texas A&M, and more)
- SHRDLU – early natural-language understanding program (MIT)
- SNePS – knowledge representation, reasoning, and acting system (Buffalo)
- Soar – cognitive architecture for artificial intelligence research (Carnegie Mellon)
- STUDENT – early natural-language artificial intelligence program for solving algebra word problems (MIT)
- Theano – numerical computation library for deep learning (Montréal)
- Torch – machine learning and scientific computing framework (EPFL and University of Geneva)
- U-Net – convolutional neural network architecture for image segmentation (Freiburg)
- vLLM – LLM inference and serving engine (UC Berkeley)
- Weka – machine learning software suite (Waikato)
- WordNet – lexical database used in natural language processing (Princeton)
- XGBoost – gradient-boosting machine learning framework (University of Washington)

=== Large language models ===
- Apertus – multilingual large language model (ETH Zurich, EPFL, and Swiss National Supercomputing Centre)
- Stanford Alpaca – instruction-following large language model based on LLaMA 7B (Stanford University)
- Vicuna – conversational LLM developed by LMSYS researchers (UC Berkeley, Carnegie Mellon, UC San Diego, and MBZUAI)

== Educational and visual programming environments ==
- Alice – educational programming environment (Virginia and Carnegie Mellon)
- BlueJ – educational Java development environment (Kent and Deakin)
- DrJava – lightweight Java development environment (Rice)
- DrRacket – graphical programming environment for Racket and Scheme (Rice, Northeastern, Utah, and more)
- Greenfoot – educational Java development environment (Kent and La Trobe)
- Karel – educational programming language for beginners (Stanford)
- Logo – educational programming language developed at BBN and (MIT)
- NetLogo – agent-based modeling language and environment (Northwestern)
- Processing – visual arts programming language and environment (MIT)
- Scratch – block-based educational programming language (MIT)
- ScratchJr – introductory visual programming language (Tufts and MIT)
- Snap! – block-based educational programming language (UC Berkeley)
- StarLogo – agent-based simulation language (MIT)

== Programming languages ==
- Alice ML – functional programming language (Saarland)
- BCPL – systems programming language first implemented by Martin Richards (Cambridge)
- BLISS – systems programming language (Carnegie Mellon)
- Charm++ – parallel programming language and runtime system (Illinois)
- ChucK – strongly timed audio programming language (Princeton)
- Cilk – multithreaded parallel programming language (MIT)
- Clean – purely functional programming language (Radboud)
- CLU – programming language with abstract data types (MIT)
- CMU Common Lisp – Common Lisp implementation (Carnegie Mellon)
- Dartmouth BASIC – programming language developed at Dartmouth College (Dartmouth)
- Elm – functional language for web interfaces originating from a Harvard thesis (Harvard)
- Euclid – imperative programming language (Toronto)
- Euphoria – programming language developed from a Toronto graduate project (Toronto)
- Futhark – data-parallel functional programming language (Copenhagen)
- Hope – functional programming language (Edinburgh)
- Icon – high-level programming language (Arizona)
- Idris – dependently typed functional programming language (St Andrews)
- Janus – reversible imperative programming language first written at Caltech (Caltech)
- Julia – high-performance programming language for technical computing (MIT)
- Lisp – programming language family created for artificial intelligence research (MIT)
- Lua – scripting language for application software (Rio de Janeiro)
- MATLAB – numerical computing environment with origins at University of New Mexico and Stanford (New Mexico and Stanford)
- Mercury – functional logic programming language (Melbourne)
- Miranda – lazy functional programming language (Kent)
- MIT/GNU Scheme – implementation of the Scheme programming language (MIT)
- ML – functional programming language developed for theorem proving (Edinburgh)
- Modula-2 – systems programming language (ETH Zurich)
- NESL – nested data-parallel programming language (Carnegie Mellon)
- Nyquist – sound synthesis and composition language (Carnegie Mellon)
- Oberon – systems programming language (ETH Zurich)
- Oz – multiparadigm programming language (UCLouvain)
- Pascal – structured programming language (ETH Zurich)
- Prolog – logic programming language (Aix-Marseille)
- R – statistical computing language and environment (Auckland)
- Racket – general-purpose programming language originally created by the PLT research group (Northeastern, Utah, and more)
- S/SL – syntax and semantic language (Toronto)
- Scheme – Lisp-family programming language (MIT)
- Tcl – scripting language created at UC Berkeley (UC Berkeley)
- Turing – educational programming language (Toronto)
- Ur – functional programming language for web applications (MIT)

== Compilers and software development tools ==
- Amsterdam Compiler Kit – portable compiler suite and toolchain (Vrije Universiteit Amsterdam)
- ANTLR – parser generator originating from the Purdue Compiler Construction Tool Set (Purdue)
- Berkeley Yacc – parser generator originating from doctoral research (UC Berkeley)
- Concurrent Versions System – version-control system originally developed at Vrije Universiteit Amsterdam
- Glasgow Haskell Compiler – compiler for the Haskell programming language (Glasgow)
- LLVM – compiler infrastructure project (Illinois)
- NetBeans – integrated development environment originating as a student project (Charles University)
- Revision Control System – early version-control system (Purdue)
- SableCC – compiler and parser generator originating as a graduate research project (McGill)
- SPIM – MIPS simulator for teaching assembly language (Wisconsin)
- Standard ML of New Jersey – compiler and IDE for Standard ML (Princeton and Bell Labs)
- WATBOL – educational COBOL compiler (Waterloo)
- WATFIV – educational FORTRAN compiler system (Waterloo)
- WATIAC – assembly-language teaching system (Waterloo)

== Text editors ==
- ECCE – text editor designed at the (Edinburgh)
- Emacs – extensible text editor family originating at the MIT AI Lab (MIT)
- ex – line editor that evolved into vi (UC Berkeley)
- Lapis – experimental text editor and web browser developed at MIT
- nvi – free implementation of vi for BSD systems (UC Berkeley)
- Pico – text editor from the Pine email software project (Washington)
- TECO – text editor and programming environment associated with MIT time-sharing systems (MIT)
- vi – screen-oriented text editor created for BSD Unix (UC Berkeley)

== Databases, data management, and distributed storage ==
- Alluxio – virtual distributed file system originally named Tachyon (UC Berkeley)
- Apache Flink – stream-processing framework originating from the Stratosphere project (TU Berlin)
- Apache Mesos – cluster resource-management framework (UC Berkeley)
- Apache Spark – data analytics and cluster-computing engine (UC Berkeley)
- Berkeley DB – embedded key-value database library (UC Berkeley)
- C-Store – column-oriented database management system (Brown, Brandeis, MIT, and UMass Boston)
- Ceph – distributed object, block, and file storage platform (UC Santa Cruz)
- Chord – peer-to-peer distributed hash table protocol (MIT)
- Dataverse – research data repository software (Harvard)
- Ingres – relational database system (UC Berkeley)
- InterMezzo – distributed file system started from the Coda project (Carnegie Mellon)
- Mimer SQL – relational database system originating as a research project (Uppsala)
- PostgreSQL – object-relational database system (UC Berkeley)
- Transbase – relational database management system originating at TUM

== Computer graphics, visualization, and image editing ==
- 3D Slicer – medical image analysis and scientific visualization software (MIT and Brigham and Women's Hospital)
- BumpTop – 3D desktop environment (Toronto)
- Coot – molecular-graphics model-building software (York)
- FITS Liberator – astronomical FITS image-processing software developed with Caltech/IPAC (Caltech)
- GIMP – raster graphics editor started as a UC Berkeley student project (UC Berkeley)
- Jmol – molecular visualization software originally developed at Notre Dame
- Matplotlib – plotting and data-visualization library originating from University of Chicago research (Chicago)
- Montage – astronomy image-mosaicking software toolkit (Caltech)
- Processing – creative coding language and environment (MIT)
- Sketchpad – pioneering interactive computer graphics program (MIT)
- UCSF Chimera – molecular visualization and analysis software (UCSF)
- Visual Molecular Dynamics – molecular visualization software (Illinois)
- VPython – Python-based 3D visualization environment (Carnegie Mellon)

== Early personal-computing software ==
- PLATO – computer-assisted instruction system (Illinois)
- VisiCalc – early spreadsheet program created by Dan Bricklin and Bob Frankston (MIT and Harvard)

== Games ==
- Rogue – dungeon-crawling video game (UC Santa Cruz and UC Berkeley)
- Spacewar! – early digital computer game (MIT)
- Tux Racer – open-source racing game started as a graphics project (Waterloo)
- Zork – text adventure game developed at MIT (MIT)

== Education, publishing, and research infrastructure ==
- DSpace – digital repository software (MIT)
- ILIAS – open-source learning management system (Cologne)
- Knowledge Forum – computer-supported collaborative learning software (Toronto)
- MIT App Inventor – visual programming environment for Android applications (MIT)
- Open Journal Systems – journal management and publishing software (British Columbia and Simon Fraser)
- pdfTeX – TeX extension for direct PDF output (Masaryk)
- Sakai – learning management system developed by a university consortium (Michigan, Indiana, MIT, and Stanford)
- Scribe – document-preparation system developed as a doctoral project (Carnegie Mellon)
- Zotero – reference management software (George Mason)

== Formal methods and theorem proving ==
- ACL2 – theorem prover and programming language (Texas)
- Agda – dependently typed programming language and proof assistant (Chalmers)
- Alloy – software specification language and analyzer (MIT)
- Boyer–Moore theorem prover – automated theorem prover (Texas)
- FDR – CSP refinement checker (Oxford)
- HOL – theorem proving system (Cambridge)
- ISP Formal Verification Tool – formal verification tool for MPI programs (Utah)
- Isabelle – theorem prover developed at Cambridge and TUM (Cambridge and TUM)
- KeY – formal verification tool for Java programs (KIT, TU Darmstadt, and Chalmers)
- Logic for Computable Functions – theorem prover developed at Stanford and Edinburgh (Stanford and Edinburgh)
- Mizar – proof assistant and formal mathematics system (Białystok, Alberta, and Shinshu)
- Murφ – explicit-state model checker (Stanford)
- Nuprl – proof development system (Cornell)
- PRISM – probabilistic model checker (Birmingham and Oxford)
- Rocq – proof assistant formerly known as Coq (INRIA, École Polytechnique, Paris-Sud, and others)
- Rodin tool – formal modelling tool for Event-B (Newcastle and other project partners)
- Twelf – logical framework and theorem-proving environment (Carnegie Mellon)
- UPPAAL – model checker for real-time systems (Uppsala and Aalborg)

== Geographic information systems and mapping ==
- Generic Mapping Tools – map-generation and geoscience data-processing tools (Columbia and Hawaii)
- GeoDa – spatial data analysis and geovisualization software (Illinois and Chicago)
- GPlates – plate-tectonics visualization software (Sydney and Caltech)
- MapServer – web mapping application development environment (Minnesota)
- SAGA GIS – geoscientific GIS software (Göttingen and Hamburg)
- TerrSet – GIS and remote sensing software developed by Clark Labs (Clark)
- Whitebox Geospatial Analysis Tools – GIS and remote sensing software (Guelph)

== Internet, web, and communication software ==
- Alpine – email client developed at the (Washington)
- Archie – early Internet search engine (McGill)
- BIND – DNS server software originally designed at UC Berkeley
- CCSO Nameserver – early Internet directory service (Illinois)
- CU-SeeMe – early Internet videoconferencing client (Cornell)
- Cyrus IMAP server – email server software (Carnegie Mellon)
- Eudora – email client developed at the Illinois
- Google Search – search engine originating from the NSF-supported BackRub research project (Stanford)
- Gopher – Internet document retrieval protocol and software system (Minnesota)
- Harvest project – web cache and resource-discovery project (Colorado Boulder)
- Hesiod – network name service (MIT)
- Internet Relay Chat – text-based chat system (Oulu)
- Jitsi – open-source videoconferencing project originating from a student project (Strasbourg)
- Kerberos – network authentication protocol (MIT)
- Kermit – file-transfer protocol and communications software (Columbia)
- Lycos – early web search engine (Carnegie Mellon)
- Lynx – text-based web browser (Kansas)
- Mosaic web browser – early graphical web browser (Illinois)
- NCSA HTTPd – early web server (Illinois)
- NCSA Telnet – Telnet implementation (Illinois)
- Pine – text-based email and news client (Washington)
- Psiphon – censorship-circumvention software (Toronto)
- Squid – caching proxy derived from the Harvest project (Colorado Boulder and UC San Diego)
- Talkomatic – early multi-user online chat system (Illinois)
- TkWWW – early web browser and HTML editor (MIT)
- UW IMAP – reference IMAP server implementation (Washington)
- ViolaWWW – early graphical web browser (UC Berkeley)
- WebCT – web-based course management system (UBC)
- Zephyr – instant messaging protocol and application suite (MIT)
- ZMailer – mail transfer agent (Toronto)

== Operating systems, kernels, and networking systems ==
- Accent kernel – operating system kernel and predecessor to Mach (Carnegie Mellon)
- Aleph kernel – early operating-system kernel for the Rochester's Intelligent Gateway project (Rochester)
- Amoeba – distributed operating system (Vrije Universiteit Amsterdam)
- Andrew File System – distributed file system (Carnegie Mellon)
- Andrew Project – distributed computing environment (Carnegie Mellon)
- Barrelfish – open-source distributed operating system (ETH Zurich and Microsoft Research)
- Berkeley Software Distribution – Unix operating system distribution (UC Berkeley)
- Berkeley sockets – networking API from BSD (UC Berkeley)
- Cambridge Distributed Computing System – distributed operating system (Cambridge)
- Coda – distributed file system (Carnegie Mellon)
- Compatible Time-Sharing System – early time-sharing operating system (MIT)
- EROS – capability-based research operating system (Penn and Johns Hopkins)
- Exokernel – operating system kernel architecture (MIT)
- GFS2 – shared-disk file system with origins at the University of Minnesota (Minnesota)
- HelenOS – research multiserver microkernel operating system (Charles)
- Hydra – capability-based operating system (Carnegie Mellon)
- Incompatible Timesharing System – time-sharing operating system (MIT)
- K42 – research operating system (Toronto)
- Linux kernel – Unix-like operating system kernel started by a student at the Helsinki
- Mach (kernel) – operating system kernel (Carnegie Mellon)
- Michigan Terminal System – mainframe time-sharing operating system (Michigan and other universities)
- MINIX – Unix-like teaching operating system (Vrije Universiteit Amsterdam)
- Multics – time-sharing operating system developed with MIT participation (MIT)
- MUSIC/SP – mainframe time-sharing operating system (McGill)
- Nemesis – multimedia-oriented operating system (Cambridge and others)
- ORVYL and WYLBUR – time-sharing monitor and text-editing system (Stanford)
- RIOT – real-time operating system for IoT devices (FU Berlin, INRIA, and HAW Hamburg)
- Sprite – experimental Unix-like distributed operating system (UC Berkeley)
- THE multiprogramming system – early multiprogramming operating system (Eindhoven)
- Thoth – real-time message-passing operating system (Waterloo)
- TRIPOS – portable operating system (Cambridge)
- TRIX – Unix-like operating system (MIT)
- TUNIS – Unix-compatible operating system (Toronto)
- V – microkernel distributed operating system (Stanford)
- X Window System – windowing system for bitmap displays (MIT)
- Xinu – teaching operating system (Purdue)
- Xv6 – teaching operating system based on Unix Version 6 (MIT)

== Robotics, simulation, and modeling ==
- BAITSSS – evapotranspiration and remote-sensing model (Idaho)
- Gazebo – robotics simulation platform (USC)
- NEURON – neuronal simulation environment (Duke and Yale)
- ns – discrete-event network simulator (UC Berkeley)
- OpenModelica – Modelica-based modeling and simulation environment (Linköping)
- OpenRAVE – robotics motion-planning environment (Carnegie Mellon)
- OpenSees – earthquake engineering simulation framework (UC Berkeley)
- Player/Stage – robot control and simulation tools (USC)
- Robot Operating System – robotics middleware system with early Stanford origins (Stanford)
- SU2 – computational fluid dynamics and design software (Stanford)
- Webots – robot simulation software (EPFL)

== Scientific and numerical computing ==
- CHARMM – molecular simulation program (Harvard)
- CoCoA – computer algebra system (Genoa)
- Fastest Fourier Transform in the West – fast Fourier transform software library (MIT)
- Folding@home – distributed protein-folding computing project (Stanford)
- GAP – computational discrete algebra system (Aachen and St Andrews)
- GROMACS – molecular dynamics package (Groningen)
- GNU Octave – numerical computing software associated with University of Wisconsin–Madison (Wisconsin–Madison)
- HTCondor – high-throughput computing software framework (Wisconsin–Madison)
- Macaulay2 – computer algebra system for algebraic geometry and commutative algebra (Illinois and Cornell)
- Macsyma – computer algebra system (MIT)
- Magma – computer algebra system (Sydney)
- Maple – symbolic and numeric computing environment (Waterloo)
- Maxima – computer algebra system derived from Macsyma (MIT)
- Meep – finite-difference time-domain simulation software (MIT)
- METAFONT – font description language and system (Stanford)
- MPB – software package for computing photonic band structures (MIT)
- NAMD – molecular dynamics software (Illinois)
- NUPACK – nucleic acid analysis and design software suite (Caltech)
- PARI/GP – computer algebra system for number theory (Bordeaux)
- Rosetta – macromolecular modeling software suite (Washington)
- SageMath – mathematics software system (Washington)
- SETI@home – volunteer computing project for radio-signal analysis (UC Berkeley)
- SMP – computer algebra system and predecessor to Mathematica (Caltech)
- TeX – digital typesetting system (Stanford)

== See also ==
- List of computer science awards
- List of Bell labs discoveries and developments
- List of free and open-source software packages
- List of R&D laboratories
- List of university artificial intelligence research centers
- Carnegie Mellon University software
- Massachusetts Institute of Technology software
- University of Toronto software
- University of Minnesota software
- Berkeley Software Distribution
- RISC-V – open-source hardware architecture developed at UC Berkeley
- lowRISC – open-source silicon nonprofit spun out of the Cambridge
- OpenRISC – open-source processor architecture started by Slovenian university students
- OpenROAD Project – open-source electronic design automation project led by UC San Diego
