= Australian Go Association =

Australian governing body for the board game Go

The Australian Go Association (AGA) is the national governing body for the ancient oriental sport of go in the country of Australia. It was founded in 1978 by Clive Davies of the Sydney Go Club, Neville Smythe of the Canberra Go Club, and Bill Leveritt of the Brisbane Go Club, joined in 1982 by Melbourne and some year after that by Adelaide (clubs have existed intermittently in Perth and Hobart also). The Association is the Australian member of the International Go Federation. With the New Zealand Go Society it makes up the Oceania zone of the IGF and thus shares one seat on the IGF's board of directors. The aims of the association are:

- to promote the game of Go in Australia;
- to coordinate Go activities in Australia, in particular to arrange National Tournaments and confer National Titles and individual rankings;
- to represent Australia in international go affairs, in particular by membership of the International Go Federation, and to select Australian representatives for international events such as the World Amateur Go Championships;
- to promote mutual understanding and friendly relations with Go players throughout the world in association with foreign national Go associations.

== History ==
- In 1977 the inaugural general meeting of the Association was held in Sydney.
- In 1978 the first Australian Championships were held under the aegis of the Association, and have been held every year since.
- In 2002 the first Toyota & Denso Cup World Go Oza regional tournament for Australia was held. These continued every two years until the global event was cancelled in 2008 by the sponsors.
- In 2007 the first Korean Ambassador's Cup was held in Sydney. This is the national qualifier for competitors to the Korean Prime Ministers' Cup.
- In 2009 the Association converted itself from a federation of clubs to a national association of individual members.
- In 2015 the first Australian Go Congress was held, with a second one in 2016.

== Present day ==
The AGA selects the host club or city for the Australian National Go Championships every year. Based upon individual members' performance in tournament play, it selects the Australian competitors for the World Amateur Go Championships, Korean Prime Minister's Cup, and in appropriate years the World Amateur Pair Go Championships. There are a fair number of state championships, club events, and national tournaments held around the country each year which earn their competitors Australian representative points (for selection) and Elo points (for updating the national ranking and rating tables).

As of 2024, membership is free to most Australian go players. A minority of members pay an annual subscription, or donate as sponsors, to sustain the association's operations. The organisation's honorary national coach remains An Young-gil who is a professional eighth dan and baduk teacher from Korea, based in Sydney. The most active cities for Australian go activity and AGA-affiliated clubs remain Brisbane, Melbourne, and Sydney.

== See also ==
- Australia New Zealand Backgammon Federation
- Australian Bridge Federation
- Australian Chess Federation
- Australian Draughts Federation
- Poker Federation of Australia
