= Martin Bryant (programmer) =

British computer programmer (born 1958)

- Born: 1958 (age 67–68)
- Occupation: Programmer
- Years active: 1976-2025
- Known for: Computer chess programming
- Notable work: Colossus Chess

Martin Bryant (born 1958) is a British computer programmer known as the author of White Knight and Colossus Chess, a 1980s commercial chess-playing program, and Colossus Draughts, gold medal winner at the 2nd Computer Olympiad in 1990.

== Computer chess ==
Bryant started developing his first chess program – later named White Knight – in 1976. This program won the European Microcomputer Chess Championship in 1983, and was commercially released, in two versions (Mk 11 and Mk 12) for the BBC Micro and Acorn Electron in the early 1980s. White Knight featured a then-novel display of principal variation – called "Best line" – that would become commonplace in computer chess.

Bryant used White Knight as a basis for development of Colossus Chess (1983), a chess-playing program that was published for a large number of home computer platforms in the 1980s, and was later ported to Atari ST, Amiga and IBM PC as Colossus Chess X. Colossus Chess sold well and was well-received, being described by the Zzap!64 magazine in 1985 as "THE best chess implementation yet to hit the 64, and indeed possibly any home micro".

Bryant later released several versions of his Colossus chess engine conforming to the UCI standard. The latest version was released in 2025 as Colossus 2025a.

== Computer draughts ==
After chess, Bryant's interests turned to computer draughts (checkers). His program, Colossus Draughts, won the West of England championship in June 1990, thus becoming the first draughts program to win a human tournament. In August of the same year it won the gold medal at the 2nd Computer Olympiad, beating Chinook, a strong Canadian program, into second place.

Chinook's developers, headed by Jonathan Schaeffer, recognised Colossus' opening book as its major strength; it contained 40,000 positions compared to Chinook's 4,500, and relied on Bryant's research that had found flaws in the established draughts literature. In 1993, an agreement was made to trade Colossus' opening book for the Chinook's six-piece databases; Bryant also accepted the offer to join the Chinook development team. In August 1994, Chinook played a match against World Champion Marion Tinsley and world number two Don Lafferty (after Tinsley's withdrawal due to illness), earning the title of Man-Machine World Champion.

Bryant continued work on Colossus Draughts in the early 1990s, and in 1995, released an updated commercial version called Colossus '95, as well as draughts database programs DraughtsBase and DraughtsBase 2.

== Personal life ==
Bryant was born in Bristol as the second son of Ronald and Constance Bryant. He grew up in Ystrad Mynach in South Wales from the age of five. He attended Lewis School, Pengam from 1969-1976 and Victoria University of Manchester from 1976-1980 where he got a BSc in Computer Science. After graduation he worked for Posidata writing machine tool control software for about 18 months before becoming self-employed to work on his chess program during the micro-computer revolution in the 1980s. Later he worked for Zeneca and Hewlett-Packard before retiring in 2020. He lives in the Manchester area. He has two children.

He learned chess as a young child and played in various chess clubs throughout his life. Nowadays he plays casually online on Lichess and chess.com.

More information can be found on his website.
