= Elbert Lowder =

American checkers player

Elbert Lowder (1932 – December 14, 2006) was an American checkers champion noted for dominating the "11-man ballot". He worked as a piano tuner and was from North Carolina. As one of the grandmasters who played against the Chinook program he is mentioned several times in Jonathan Schaeffer's book One Jump Ahead: Challenging Human Supremacy in Checkers. Elbert Lowder was a member of the United Methodist Church.
