= Libratus =

Artificial intelligence poker playing computer program

Libratus is an artificial intelligence computer program designed to play poker, specifically heads up no-limit Texas hold 'em. Libratus' creators intend for it to be generalisable to other, non-poker-specific applications. It was developed at Carnegie Mellon University, Pittsburgh.

== Background ==
While Libratus was written from scratch, it is the nominal successor of Claudico. Like its predecessor, its name is a Latin expression and means 'balanced'.

Libratus was built with more than 15 million core hours of computation as compared to 2-3 million for Claudico. The computations were carried out on the new 'Bridges' supercomputer at the Pittsburgh Supercomputing Center. According to one of Libratus' creators, Professor Tuomas Sandholm, Libratus does not have a fixed built-in strategy, but an algorithm that computes the strategy. The technique involved is a new variant of counterfactual regret minimization, namely the CFR+ method introduced in 2014 by Oskari Tammelin. On top of CFR+, Libratus used a new technique that Sandholm and his PhD student, Noam Brown, developed for the problem of endgame solving. Their new method gets rid of the prior de facto standard in Poker programming, called "action mapping".

Concurrently with Libratus's development, an international team from Charles University, Czech Technical University, and the University of Alberta developed DeepStack, which in December 2016 became the first computer program to defeat professional poker players in heads-up no-limit Texas hold 'em. While both systems used counterfactual regret minimization, they differed in their approaches: DeepStack employed neural networks for evaluating game states, whereas Libratus did not use neural networks for leaf evaluation.

As Libratus plays only against one other human or computer player, the special 'heads up' rules for two-player Texas hold 'em are enforced.

== 2017 humans versus AI match ==
From January 11 to 31, 2017, Libratus was in a tournament ("Brains vs. Artificial Intelligence: Upping the Ante challenge") against four top-class human poker players, namely Jason Les, Dong Kim, Daniel McAulay and Jimmy Chou. In order to gain results of more statistical significance, 120,000 hands were to be played, a 50% increase compared to the previous tournament that Claudico played in 2015. To manage the extra volume, the duration of the tournament was increased from 13 to 20 days.

The four players were grouped into two subteams of two players each. One of the subteams was playing in the open, while the other subteam was located in a separate room nicknamed 'The Dungeon' where no mobile phones or other external communications were allowed. The Dungeon subteam got the same sequence of cards as was being dealt in the open, except that the sides were switched: The Dungeon humans got the cards that the AI got in the open and vice versa. This setup was intended to nullify the effect of card luck.

The prize money of $200,000 was shared exclusively between the human players. Each player received a minimum of $20,000, with the rest distributed in relation to their success playing against the AI. As written in the tournament rules in advance, the AI itself did not receive prize money even though it won the tournament against the human team.

During the tournament, Libratus was competing against the players during the days. Overnight it was perfecting its strategy on its own by analysing the prior gameplay and results of the day, particularly its losses. Therefore, it was able to continuously straighten out the imperfections that the human team had discovered in their extensive analysis, resulting in a permanent arms race between the humans and Libratus. It used another 4 million core hours on the Bridges supercomputer for the competition's purposes.

During the tournament, there was an active betting market among poker players about who would win the tournament. It started with 4:1 against the bot, but on the 8th day it became a betting market on which human would lose the least..

=== Strength of the AI ===
Libratus had been leading against the human players from day one of the tournament. The player Dong Kim was quoted on the AI's strength as follows: "I didn’t realize how good it was until today. I felt like I was playing against someone who was cheating, like it could see my cards. I’m not accusing it of cheating. It was just that good."

At the 16th day of the competition, Libratus broke through the $1,000,000 barrier for the first time. At the end of that day, it was ahead $1,194,402 in chips against the human team. At the end of the competition, Libratus was ahead $1,766,250 in chips and thus won resoundingly. As the big blind in the matches was set to $100, Libratus' winrate is equivalent to 14.7 big blinds per 100 hands. This is considered an exceptionally high winrate in poker and is highly statistically significant.

For comparison, DeepStack achieved a winrate of 49 big blinds per 100 hands in its study against 11 professionals over 44,000 hands, though the different testing conditions (number of hands, opponent skill levels, and tournament format) make direct comparisons difficult.

Of the human players, Dong Kim came first, MacAulay second, Jimmy Chou third, and Jason Les fourth.

Name	Rank	Results (in chips)
Dong Kim	1	-$85,649
Daniel MacAulay	2	-$277,657
Jimmy Chou	3	-$522,857
Jason Les	4	-$880,087
Total:		-$1,766,250

The bot has an unconventional betting style where under specific situations it would bet $20,000 even when there's $100 in the pot. After its win, this strategy was analyzed and adopted by the poker community.

== Other possible applications ==
While Libratus' first application was to play poker, its designers had a much broader mission in mind for the AI. The investigators designed the AI to be able to learn any game or situation in which incomplete information is available and "opponents" may be hiding information or even engaging in deception. Because of this Sandholm and his colleagues are proposing to apply the system to other, real-world problems as well, including cybersecurity, business negotiations, or medical planning.

== See also ==
- DeepStack
- Computer poker players

- Cepheus (poker bot)
- Claudico
- Polaris (poker bot)
- Libratus
- Pluribus (poker bot)
