= Australian Bridge Federation =

- Sport: Bridge
- Jurisdiction: Australia
- Abbreviation: ABF
- Founded: 1935
- Affiliation: World Bridge Federation
- Headquarters: Fyshwick, Australian Capital Territory
- President: Stephen Fischer
- CEO: Dagmar Neumann
- Vice president: Richard Ward
- Director: David Fryd
- Secretary: Jenny Thompson
- Replaced: Australian Bridge Council
- (Australia)

Australian Bridge Federation is the governing body for the sport of Bridge in Australia.

== History ==
The Double Bay bridge scene has a fascinating history that spans high-stakes card sharps, European migration, and a famous piece of Sydney's criminal underworld.

== See also ==
- Australia New Zealand Backgammon Federation
- Australian Chess Federation
- Australian Draughts Federation
- Australian Go Association
- Poker Federation of Australia
