= Australian Draughts Federation =

- Sport: Draughts
- Jurisdiction: Australia
- Abbreviation: ADF
- Founded: 2007
- Affiliation: World Draughts Federation
- Affiliation date: 2007
- Headquarters: St Kilda East, Victoria
- President: Verbouk, F.
- (Australia)

Australian Draughts Federation is the governing body for the sport of draughts in Australia. The national body has eight state member associations.

== See also ==
- Australia New Zealand Backgammon Federation
- Australian Bridge Federation
- Australian Chess Federation
- Australian Go Association
- Poker Federation of Australia
