= Noam Brown =

Computer scientist and artificial intelligence researcher

- Education: Rutgers University (BA); Carnegie Mellon University (MS, PhD)
- Occupation: Computer scientist
- Employer(s): OpenAI (2023–present); Facebook AI Research (2018–2023)
- Known for: Libratus; Pluribus; CICERO o1
- Awards: Marvin Minsky Medal (2019); NeurIPS Best Paper Award (2017); MIT Technology Review Innovators Under 35 (2019)
- Scientific career
- Doctoral advisor: Tuomas Sandholm

Noam Brown is a computer scientist and artificial intelligence researcher whose work has focused on strategic reasoning, imperfect-information games, reinforcement learning, and reasoning in large language models. He developed Libratus (2017) and Pluribus (2019) with Thomas Sandholm, the first artificial intelligence systems to defeat top human professionals in heads-up and multiplayer no-limit Texas hold 'em, respectively. He later helped develop CICERO (2022), an AI system that achieved human-level performance in the strategy game Diplomacy.

Since 2023, Brown has been a research scientist at OpenAI, where he was a foundational contributor to the research behind the reasoning model o1 and has worked on test-time scaling and multi-agent systems.

== Early life and education ==
Brown attended Rutgers University, where he earned a Bachelor of Arts in mathematics and computer science in 2008, graduating summa cum laude as a member of the Rutgers College Honors Program.

From 2006 to 2010, Brown worked in algorithmic trading at MJM Trading Group in New York, before joining the Federal Reserve Board of Governors as a research assistant from 2010 to 2012, where he studied algorithmic trading in financial markets.

In 2012, Brown enrolled at Carnegie Mellon University, earning a master's degree in robotics in 2014 under the supervision of Sandholm, before continuing into the doctoral program in computer science. He completed his PhD in 2020 with the dissertation Equilibrium Finding for Large Adversarial Imperfect-Information Games, also supervised by Sandholm, which built on the algorithms he had developed for Libratus and Pluribus. The dissertation received the Carnegie Mellon School of Computer Science Distinguished Dissertation Award, the AAAI/ACM SIGAI Dissertation Award, and the International Foundation for Autonomous Agents and Multiagent Systems (IFAAMAS) Victor Lesser Distinguished Dissertation Award, all in 2020. He spent part of his graduate studies as a research intern at DeepMind in London in 2017.

== Career ==
=== Carnegie Mellon University: Libratus and Pluribus ===
As a graduate student in Sandholm's research group, Brown worked on computational game theory and equilibrium-finding algorithms for large adversarial games, building on the group's earlier poker programs, including Tartanian7 and Claudico. In January 2017, Libratus became the first computer program to defeat top professional players in heads-up no-limit Texas hold 'em, beating four professionals—Dong Kim, Jason Les, Jimmy Chou, and Daniel McAulay—over 120,000 hands in a 20-day competition at Rivers Casino in Pittsburgh, "Brains vs. Artificial Intelligence: Upping the Ante," and winning by more than $1.76 million in chips. A paper describing Libratus, co-authored by Brown and Sandholm, was published in Science in 2018. A related paper, "Safe and Nested Subgame Solving for Imperfect-Information Games," describing a core technique behind Libratus, received a Best Paper Award at NeurIPS 2017.

In July 2019, while completing his PhD and concurrently working as a research scientist at Facebook AI Research, Brown and Sandholm unveiled Pluribus, an AI that defeated elite professionals at six-player no-limit Texas hold 'em. Unlike heads-up poker, six-player poker is not a two-player zero-sum game, so many of the theoretical guarantees available for two-player games do not directly apply. In one experiment, professionals Darren Elias and Chris Ferguson each played 5,000 hands as the sole human against five independent copies of Pluribus; in another, one copy of Pluribus played 10,000 hands against five professionals at a time, drawn from a pool of thirteen. Pluribus was profitable in both settings. The result was published as the cover article of Science and was named one of nine runners-up for the journal's Breakthrough of the Year for 2019.

=== Facebook AI Research: CICERO ===
Brown joined Facebook AI Research (FAIR) in 2018, initially continuing his poker research. At FAIR he later worked on systems combining strategic planning with natural-language interaction. In November 2022, Brown was part of the Meta FAIR Diplomacy team that introduced CICERO, described in its Science publication as the first AI agent to achieve human-level performance in Diplomacy, a seven-player strategy game that requires natural-language negotiation and tactical coordination between cooperation and competition. CICERO integrated a language model with planning and reinforcement-learning components that inferred other players' beliefs and intentions from their conversations and generated dialogue in pursuit of its plans. Playing anonymously against humans on the online platform webDiplomacy.net across 40 games, it achieved more than double the average score of human participants and ranked in the top 10 percent of players who had played more than one game.

=== OpenAI: reasoning models and multi-agent systems ===
Brown joined OpenAI as a research scientist in 2023. At OpenAI, Brown describes himself as a foundational contributor to the reasoning research that led to o1, which was released in September 2024 and had been developed internally under the codename "Strawberry." TechCrunch has independently described him as one of the model's architects.

Brown has argued that increasing computation at inference ("test") time can produce substantial performance gains without proportionally increasing model size or training compute. In an October 2024 talk at the TEDAI conference in San Francisco, he cited an earlier poker experiment in which extending a bot's "thinking" time by roughly 20 seconds produced a performance improvement that he compared to scaling model size and training compute by a factor of about 100,000.

Brown subsequently worked on multi-agent systems as a means of scaling inference-time computation in parallel, and in late 2024 he publicly announced that OpenAI was expanding a research team in this area. In March 2025, TechCrunch described Brown as leading AI-reasoning research at OpenAI.

In September 2026, OpenAI announced that an internal, unreleased model operating through roughly 10,000 coordinating agents had produced a proposed resolution of the Navier–Stokes existence and smoothness problem, one of the Millennium Prize Problems, finding a construction exhibiting finite-time blowup. The result was formally checked using the Lean proof assistant but had not, as of the announcement, been independently peer-reviewed. Brown, who works on OpenAI's multi-agent research, said afterward that he would attribute little of the result to the multi-agent architecture itself, pointing instead to the strength of the underlying model, and that OpenAI had not yet run controlled experiments at that scale to isolate the contribution of coordination among agents.

== Awards and honors ==
- Marvin Minsky Medal for Outstanding Achievements in AI, International Joint Conference on Artificial Intelligence (2019), shared with Tuomas Sandholm, for the development of Libratus
- MIT Technology Review 35 Innovators Under 35, Visionary category (2019)
- NeurIPS Best Paper Award (2017), for "Safe and Nested Subgame Solving for Imperfect-Information Games"
- AAAI/ACM SIGAI Dissertation Award (2020)
- IFAAMAS Victor Lesser Distinguished Dissertation Award (2020)
- Carnegie Mellon School of Computer Science Distinguished Dissertation Award (2020)
- Allen Newell Award for Research Excellence, Carnegie Mellon University (2017)
- Open Philanthropy AI Fellowship (2018)

== Selected publications ==
- Brown, Noam; Sandholm, Tuomas (2017). "Safe and Nested Subgame Solving for Imperfect-Information Games." Advances in Neural Information Processing Systems 30 (NeurIPS).
- Brown, Noam; Sandholm, Tuomas (2018). "Superhuman AI for heads-up no-limit poker: Libratus beats top professionals." Science 359 (6374): 418–424.
- Brown, Noam; Lerer, Adam; Gross, Sam; Sandholm, Tuomas (2019). "Deep Counterfactual Regret Minimization." Proceedings of the 36th International Conference on Machine Learning (ICML).
- Brown, Noam; Sandholm, Tuomas (2019). "Superhuman AI for multiplayer poker." Science 365 (6456): 885–890.
- Brown, Noam; Bakhtin, Anton; Lerer, Adam; Gong, Qucheng (2020). "Combining Deep Reinforcement Learning and Search for Imperfect-Information Games." Advances in Neural Information Processing Systems 33 (NeurIPS).
- Meta Fundamental AI Research Diplomacy Team (FAIR); Bakhtin, Anton; Brown, Noam; et al. (2022). "Human-level play in the game of Diplomacy by combining language models with strategic reasoning." Science 378 (6624): 1067–1074.

== See also ==
- Recursive self-improvement
- Navier–Stokes priority controversy
