= Jonathan Schaeffer =

Canadian researcher and professor (born 1957)

Jonathan Schaeffer FRSC
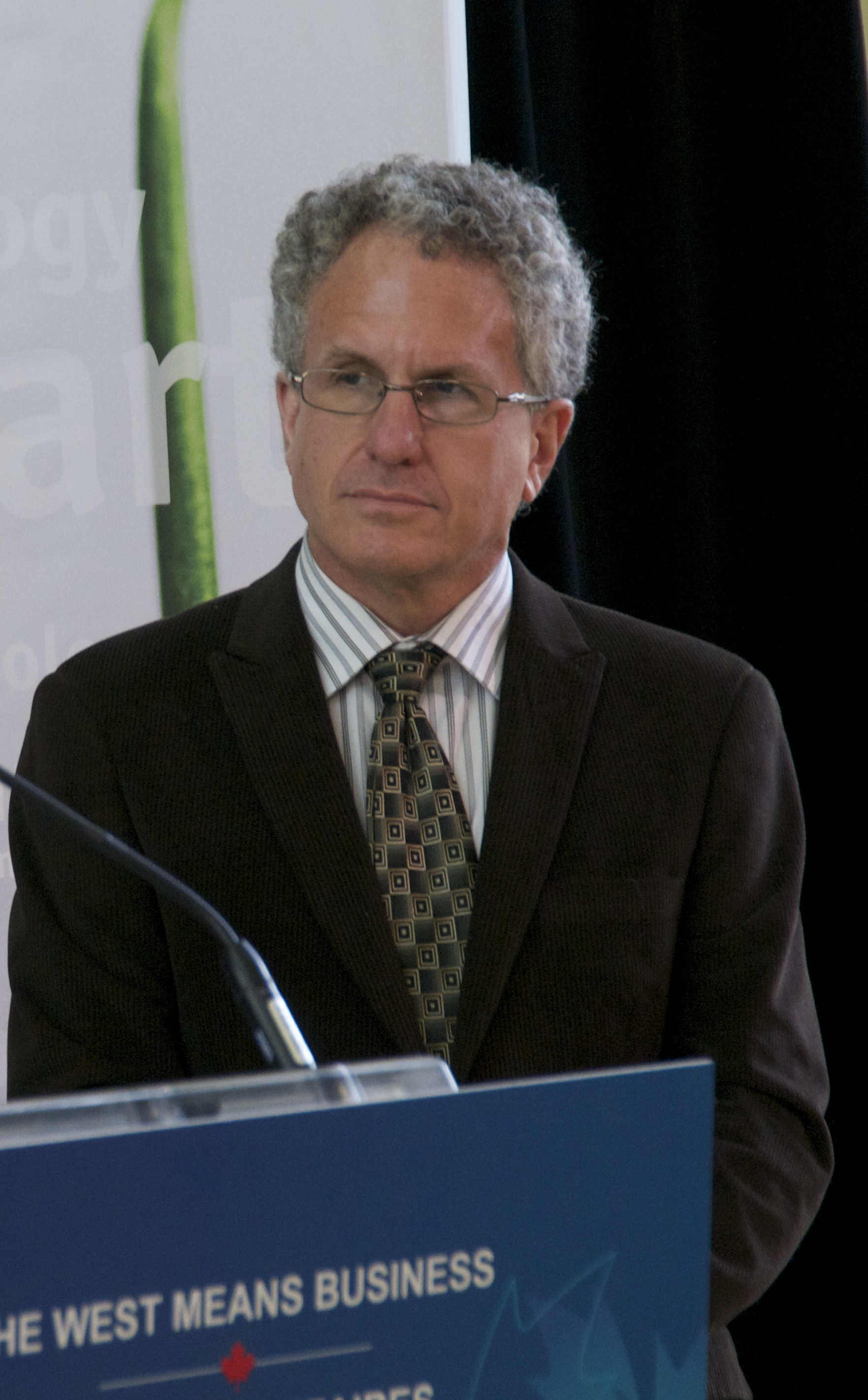
- June, 2014
- Born: 1957 (age 68–69); Toronto, Ontario
- Education: University of Waterloo; University of Toronto
- Known for: Chinook (draughts player), Polaris (poker bot)
- Awards: AAAI Fellow (2000); Alberta Centennial Medal (2005)
- Scientific career
- Fields: Artificial intelligence Heuristic search
- Workplaces: University of Alberta
- Thesis: Experiments in Search and Knowledge (1986)
- Website: sites.google.com/ualberta.ca/jonathanschaeffer

Jonathan Herbert Schaeffer FRSC (born 1957) is a Canadian researcher, Distinguished Professor Emeritus at the University of Alberta, and a former Canada Research Chair in Artificial Intelligence.

He led the team that wrote Chinook, the world's strongest American checkers player, after some relatively good results in writing computer chess programs. He is involved in the University of Alberta GAMES group developing computer poker systems. Schaeffer is also a member of the research group that created Polaris, a program designed to play the Texas Hold'em variant of poker. He is a Founder of Onlea, which produces online learning experiences, and he is the founder and CEO of Synsira Software Solutions, Inc., that develops desktop software for private AI analysis.

== Early life ==
Born in Toronto, Ontario, he received a Bachelor of Science degree in 1979 from the University of Toronto. He received a Master of Mathematics degree in 1980 and a Ph.D. in 1986 from the University of Waterloo. Schaeffer reached national master strength in chess while in his early 20s, but has played little competitive chess since that time.

== Draughts: Chinook ==
Chinook is the first computer program to win the world champion title in a competition against humans. In 1990 it won the right to play in the human World Championship by being second to Marion Tinsley in the US Nationals. At first the American Checkers Federation and English Draughts Association were against the participation of a computer in a human championship. When Tinsley resigned his title in protest, the ACF and EDA created the new title Man vs. Machine World Championship, and competition proceeded. Tinsley won with four wins to Chinook's two.

In a rematch, Chinook was declared the Man-Machine World Champion in checkers in 1994 in a match against Marion Tinsley after six drawn games, and Tinsley's withdrawal due to pancreatic cancer. While Chinook became the world champion, it had never defeated the best checkers player of all time, Tinsley, who was significantly superior to even his closest peer.

The championship continued with Chinook defending its title against Don Lafferty when it lost one game, won one and drew 18. After the match, Jonathan Schaeffer decided not to let Chinook compete anymore, but instead try to solve checkers. It was rated at 2814 Elo.

In 2007, after 18 years of computation, he proved through a weak solution that checkers always results in a draw if neither player makes a mistake. The solution involved 10^{14} calculations from endgame positions with fewer than 10 pieces on the board.

== Poker: Polaris ==
Schaeffer is a member and, until 2004, leader of the computer poker research group at the University of Alberta, which has developed several strong computer programs for playing Texas hold 'em poker. The earliest and most general of these is Poki, which uses Monte Carlo simulation to choose actions during a game. More recently, the group has focused on the two-player (Heads-Up) variant, and has developed a series of programs that approximate Nash equilibrium strategies for the game. Several of these programs (such as Poki, SparBot and VexBot) are available in products such as Poker Academy from BioTools.

In July 2007, Schaeffer announced a competition between the group's newest program, Polaris, and two human professionals, Phil Laak and Ali Eslami. The competition was held at the 2007 Association for the Advancement of Artificial Intelligence (AAAI) conference, which also hosted an international competition between computer poker programs. Out of four matches against the human professionals, Polaris won one, tied one, and lost twice; overall, the humans won the competition by a small margin. In the computer competition, Polaris (playing under the name Hyperborean) won the Limit Hold'em event and came first in the No-Limit Hold'em event. In 2008, an updated version of Polaris defeated a team of human professionals in the Second Man-Machine Poker Competition.

== Later life ==
Schaeffer was previously the vice-provost for information technology at the University of Alberta (2008–2012). He served as dean of science at the University of Alberta (2012–2018). He is a founder of Onlea which produces interactive online learning experiences such as Massive Open Online Courses. He is the founder and CEO of Synsira Software Solutions, Inc. that develops desktop software for private AI analysis.

== See also ==
- List of University of Waterloo people
