= Australian Chess Federation =

Organization dedicated to promoting the game of chess in Australia

- Sport: Chess
- Jurisdiction: Australia
- Abbreviation: ACF
- Affiliation: FIDE
- Regional affiliation: Oceania Chess Confederation
- President: Gary Wastell

Official website
- www.auschess.org.au
- (Australia)

The Australian Chess Federation (ACF) is dedicated to promoting the game of chess in Australia, and is a member of FIDE, the World Chess Federation.

The ACF administers its own chess rating system for tournaments in Australia, and runs the ACF Grand Prix, a series of chess tournaments run by local organisers. The ACF also produces a monthly email newsletter featuring local and international news, and annotated games. Currently, Gary Wastell is the president of ACF.

== Member Associations ==
The ACF consists of seven chess association members, from each of the six Australian states plus the Australian Capital Territory.

=== New South Wales Chess Association ===
The New South Wales Chess Association (NSWCA) caters for chess players in New South Wales. It was established in 1900 and operates a rating service for its members as well as running a number of tournaments throughout the year. The New South Wales Junior Chess League (NSWJCL), which caters for players under 18 years of age, is affiliated with the NSWCA.

=== Chess Victoria ===
Chess Victoria was founded in 1938 as the Victorian Chess Association and incorporated in 1983. In 2000 it was renamed Chess Victoria. The organisation's membership is composed of 16 affiliated chess clubs.

=== South Australian Chess Association ===
The South Australian Chess Association (SACA) was established in 1894, taking over chess interests for the state of South Australia from the Adelaide Chess Club.

SACA's responsibilities include: representing the State in all chess matters that are fostering and encouraging interests in chess and organising interstate matches as well as the Inter-club, State, Women's and City of Adelaide Championships. The SACA also manages the Chess Centre site where most state competitions are held.

Junior chess is organised by the South Australian Junior Chess League, which is affiliated with SACA.

=== Chess Association of Queensland ===
The CAQ is the successor of the Queensland Chess Association, founded in 1897. The Chess Association of Queensland Inc (CAQ) is the body controlling organised over-the-board chess in the State of Queensland, Australia. CAQ is a member of the Sports Federation of Queensland Inc. CAQ is a non-profit body incorporated under the Associations Incorporation Act of Queensland; its objects, powers and organisation are specified in its Constitution.

=== Chess Association of Western Australia ===
The Chess Association of Western Australia (CAWA) caters for chess players in Western Australia, primarily in and around the City of Perth.

=== Tasmanian Chess Association ===
The Tasmanian Chess Association is a not-for-profit organisation whose aims are to encourage interest, organise tournaments and oversee chess interests in Tasmania. TCA organised chess events allows participants the chance to earn or update their official Australian chess rating.

=== Australian Capital Territory Chess Association ===
The Australian Capital Territory Chess Association (ACTCA) aims to promote chess in the Australian Capital Territory and Queanbeyan. There are four chess clubs under the purview of ACTCA: ANU Chess Club, Belconnen Chess Club, Canberra Chess Club, and Tuggeranong Chess Club.

== See also ==
- Chess in Australia
- Australian Chess Championship
- Australia New Zealand Backgammon Federation
- Australian Bridge Federation
- Australian Draughts Federation
- Australian Go Association
- Poker Federation of Australia
