= Red dog (card game) =

Game of chance played with cards

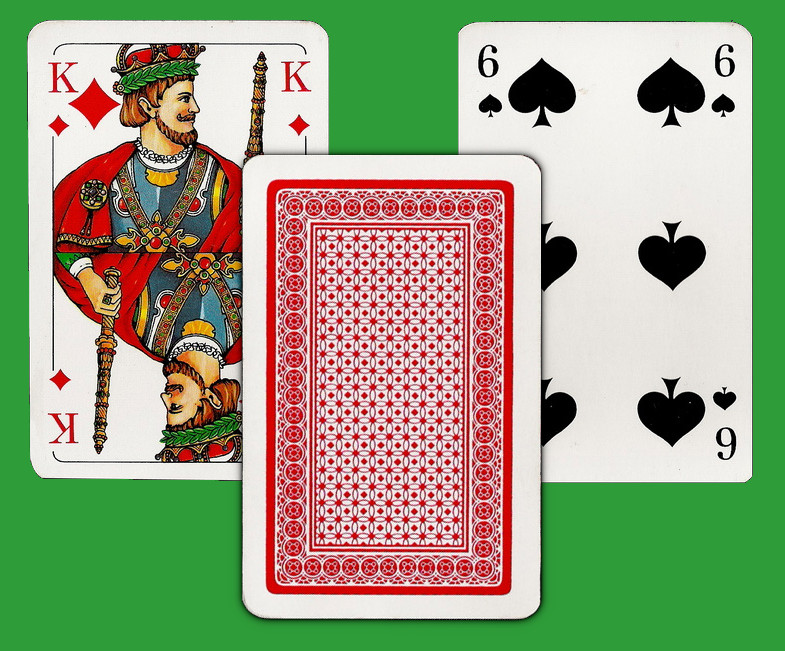
A round of red dog. Dealt two cards whose values are neither the same nor adjacent to each other, the player bets on whether the value of the third card will fall between the value of the first two.

Red dog, also known as yablon and Scottish foghorn, is a game of chance played with cards, in which two cards are dealt and a player bets on whether the rank of a third card would fall between them. While found in some land casinos, its popularity has declined, although it is featured at many online casinos.

A standard 52-card deck is used. The game may be played with anywhere from one to eight decks, with an increasing number of decks decreasing the house's edge—the house's advantage begins at 3.155% with one deck but falls to 2.751% when eight decks are used. This is in contrast with some other casino card games, such as blackjack, where a higher number of decks used will increase the house edge.

A close variant is acey deucey.

== Red dog ==
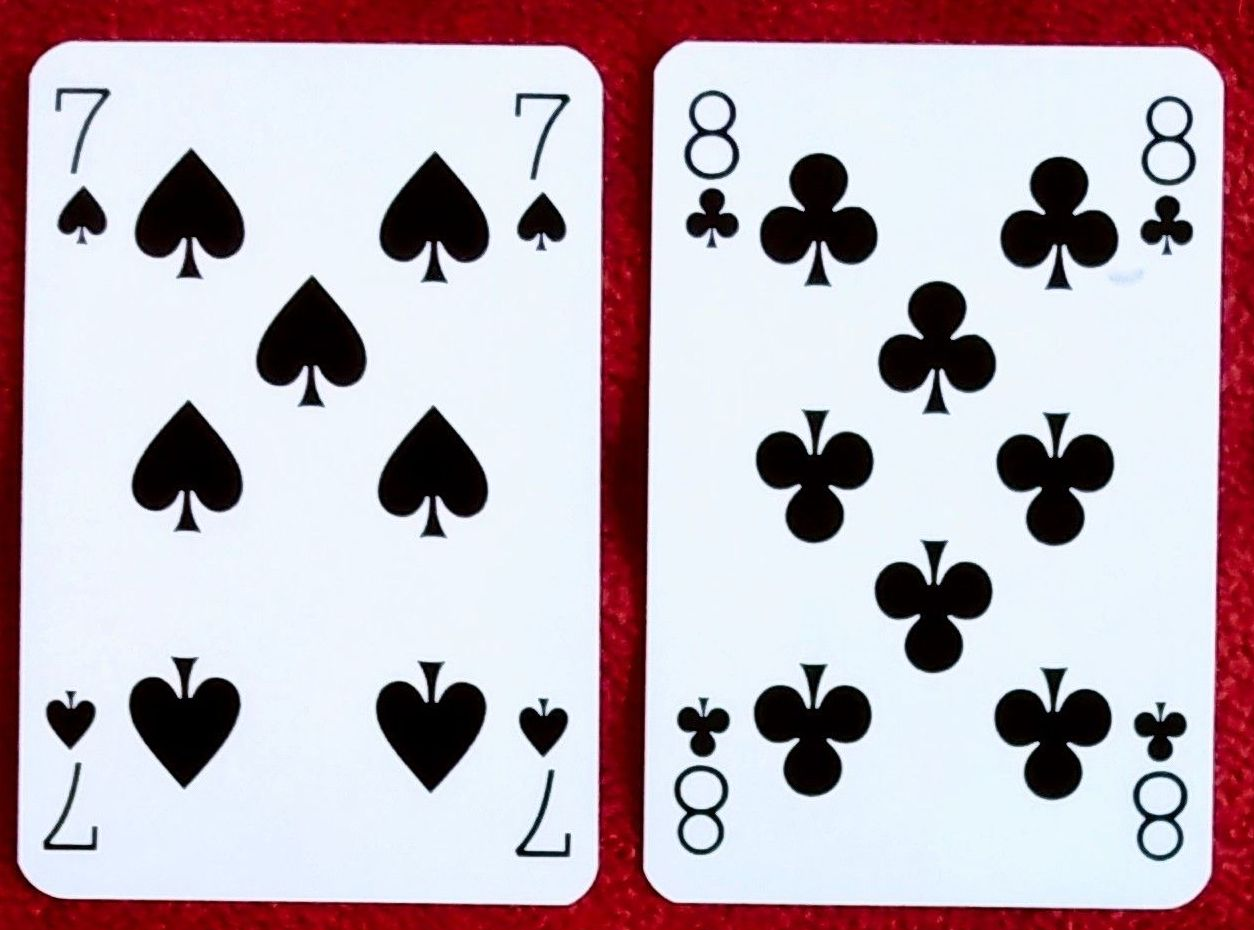
Two cards dealt with consecutive ranks are a "push", returning the player's wager.

The game only uses three cards at a time, which are ranked as in poker, with aces high. Suit is irrelevant. A wager is placed, and two cards are placed face up on the table, with three possible outcomes:

- If the cards are consecutive in number (for example, a four and a five, or a jack and a queen), the hand is a push and the player's wager is returned.
- If the two cards are of equal value, a third card is dealt. If the third card is of the same value, then the payout for the player is 11:1, otherwise, the hand is a push.
- If neither of the above is the case (for example, a three and an eight), then a spread is announced which determines the payoff (a 4-card spread, in this example), and a third card will be dealt. Before dealing the third card, the player has the option to double his bet. If the third card's value falls between the first two, the player will receive a payoff according to the spread; otherwise, the bet is lost.

=== Spread ===
The spread table is as follows:

Spread	Payout
1-card	5 to 1
2-card	4 to 1
3-card	2 to 1
4- to-11-card	1 to 1

The house edge table is as follows.

Decks	House Edge	Risk
1	3.155%	2.672%
2	3.077%	2.609%
4	2.884%	2.447%
6	2.798%	2.375%
8	2.751%	2.335%

The spread probabilities table is as follows.

Spread	Win Probability
1	0.077419
2	0.154839
3	0.232258
4	0.309677
5	0.387097
6	0.464516
7	0.541935
8	0.619355
9	0.696774
10	0.774194
11	0.851613

== Acey deucey ==
Acey deucey, also known as in-between, sheets, between the sheets or maverick, is a simple betting card game. Two cards are dealt to a player, who then bets on whether the rank of a third card will fall between those of the first two.

=== Rules ===
Before the action, each player must add their ante into the pot. Two cards are then dealt face-up to one player. That player then bets from nothing to the amount that is in the pot at the time whether or not the third card will numerically fall in between the first two. If the third card falls in between the two other cards, the bettor takes the amount they bet out of the pot; if the third card falls outside of the two other cards, the bettor must add what they bet to the pot; and if the third card matches the numerical value of one of the other two cards, the bettor must add to the pot double what they bet. If two cards of the same value come up, e.g. 2,2 the bettor picks if the next card will be higher or lower and bets. If the next card is the same as the last two, i.e. a 2, the bettor must triple their bet.

=== Regionally specific rules ===
The rules and specifics of the game often vary from region to region. For example in Liaoning province, northeast China the minimum number of players is 4 and each player is required to ante before the first card is turned. Two cards are then dealt face-up to one player. That player then bets from nothing to the amount that is in the pot at the time (during the first time around the table players are only allowed to bet up to half of the pot) whether or not the third card will numerically fall in between the first two. Other regions, such as in the United States, play the game by combining two decks of cards. This adds another dynamic to the game due to the extra number of similar type cards. Beyond that, most of the other rules followed by United States players are similar to those which are observed in the Liaoning province.

Just about all regions play if the third card falls in between the two other cards, the bettor takes the amount they bet out of the pot; if the third card falls outside of the two other cards, the bettor must add what they bet to the pot; and if the third card matches the numerical value of one of the other two cards, this is referred to as a "Post" and the bettor must add to the pot double their own initial bet. If two cards of the same value come up, e.g. 2,2 the bettor picks if the next card will be higher or lower and bets. If the next card is the same as the last two, i.e. a 2, this is considered a "Post" and the player is required to pay triple the bet for the hand.

=== Aces ===
In addition to this, there is a special rule for Aces. If the first card turned is an Ace the player may choose its value as either the high Ace or the low one. Low Ace is always lower than any other card, including the deuce. If an Ace comes up as the second card turned it is always considered the high Ace. If a player "Posts" on an Ace they are required to pay four times their bet for that hand. Aces also cause an automatic loss if it is the third card turned when the first two cards are a match, e.g. 6,6. The best spread in the game is considered to be a low Ace on the left and a high Ace on the right. This is also one of the worst hands to get as you run the risk of the third card being an Ace and having to pay four times your bet for the hand.

=== Variations ===
A variation is to split the cards if two end cards are the same value. This requires the bettor to ante in for two hands and the dealer would draw one more card under each of the end cards. After this, the same rules apply.

Some new rules that increase payouts and betting:

- Blind Pot - Bet the pot before your 2 outside cards are placed. In the case of a win, you win the pot. If you are outside of your cards you lose half the pot. If you post you have to pay the full amount of the pot.
- "AutoPot" - Any A-2 played as your outside cards automatically make the player bet the full amount of the pot.
- Post Bet - You can bet that your inside card will match one of your outside cards. In the case of this you win the full pot and in addition each player pays an equal percentage to match the pot. Therefore, the player that post would win 2x the pot. If the player bets the post and misses, they owe half the amount of the pot to the pot.
- Satan 6s - Any player that gets 6-6-6 as their cards must pay 6x the amount of the pot to the pot.

=== In popular culture ===
The game show Card Sharks is based on acey deucey and closely resembles the rules. In the show, two players answer high-low survey questions, and guess whether the next card is higher or lower (with duplicates counting as wrong).

Acey-deucey is often mentioned in the book series The Corps by W.E.B. Griffin, but that game is a table game, popular with the United States naval forces, and is not this game.

In 1978 a type-in program BASIC video game version was distributed via the book BASIC Computer Games.

An unsold 1985 game show pilot hosted by Jim McKrell, entitled Split Decision, had contestants playing the game acey deucey while answering general knowledge questions. Each player picked a card to share and had their own base card, and tried to fit a card in or bust the other player.

Red dog is a playable casino minigame in the 1998 Game Boy game James Bond 007.
