= An Young-gil =

South Korean Go player

Personal information
- Native name: 안영길 (Korean); 安永吉 (Korean)
- Full name: An Young-gil
- Born: 1 May 1980 (age 46) Seoul, South Korea

Sport
- Turned pro: 1997
- Teacher: Heo jang-hoe
- Rank: 8 dan
- Affiliation: Hanguk Kiwon

An Young-gil (born 1 May 1980) is a South Korean professional Go player of 8-dan rank. From 2011, An Young-gil was living in Australia promoting the game of Go as among other things, proprietor of the Young Go Academy in Sydney and co-founder of Go Game Guru, an open membership organization to promote Go to English-speaking students.

As of 2024 Younggil continues to be the honorary national coach of the Australian Go Association, (with duties including teaching and officiating) and professional in residence of the Sydney Go Club.

== Promotion record ==
Rank	Year	Notes
1 dan	1997	Promoted to professional dan rank after passing qualifying test.
2 dan	1998	
3 dan	1999	
4 dan	2001	
5 dan	2003	
6 dan		
7 dan		
8 dan	2009	Promoted to 8 dan.
9 dan		

== Titles and runners-up ==
Domestic
Title	Wins	Runners-up
SK Gas Cup		1 (2004)
Total	0	1
