= Don Lafferty =

British draughts player

Don Lafferty (1933–1998) was a Grandmaster checkers (British English: draughts) player. In 1982 he defeated Derek Oldbury for the World GAYP (Go as you please) championship with a score of 1-0-23. He was challenged for the championship in 1984 by Paul Davis, winning easily 5-0-15. In 1986 he defended his title again by drawing James Morrison with a score of 0-0-24 and in 1989 he defeated Elbert Lowder 4-3-16.

He contested for the 3-move restriction title twice in his career but never succeeded. In 1987 he failed to defeat Marion Tinsley, losing by a score of 2-0-36. In 1996 he tried again, this time against Ron King, but he only managed a 5-5-30 draw.

In his matches with Chinook he had 8 wins, 7 losses and 109 draws.

== Personal life ==
He received his degree from Western Kentucky University. This served him well in his primary career as a high-school math and physics teacher until he retired in 1988.

== Sources ==
- Don Lafferty biography
- Championship results
