= Colossus Chess =

- C64 box art
- Developer: Martin Bryant
- Publishers: CDS Micro Systems; English Software
- Platforms: Acorn Electron, Amiga, Amstrad CPC, Amstrad PCW, Apple II, Atari 8-bit, Atari ST, BBC Micro, Commodore 64, Plus/4, MS-DOS, Enterprise 64 & 128, MSX, ZX Spectrum
- Release: 1984–1990 (Colossus Chess); 2006–2008 (Colossus Chess UCI)
- Genre: Chess
- Mode: Single-player

Colossus Chess is a series of chess-playing computer programs developed by Martin Bryant, commercially released for various home computers in the 1980s.

== History ==
Colossus Chess 4.0 on Commodore 64

Colossus Chess 4.0 on Commodore 64 (3D chessboard)

Bryant started Colossus Chess in 1983, using his White Knight Mk 11 program, winner of the 1983 European Microcomputer Chess Championship, as a basis. It was developed on an Apple II, but was first commercially released for Commodore 64 as Colossus Chess 2.0 (CDS Micro Systems, 1984). A number of releases for 8-bit microcomputers followed. Version 3.0 was released in 1984 for the Atari 8-bit computers (published by English Software), followed by 4.0 in 1985 which was released on most formats of the day (published by CDS). As other games of the time, the Acorn Electron implementation required that part of the screen memory be used as working space.

Colossus Chess featured time-controlled play with game clocks, an opening book with 3,000 positions, and problem-solving mode that could solve normal mates, selfmates and helpmates. Pondering on opponent's time and a three-dimensional chessboard were introduced in Colossus Chess 4.0. All releases were written in the assembly language of the appropriate CPU; the ZX Spectrum version could examine an average of 170 positions per second.

Uncommon for microcomputer chess programs of the era, Colossus had a full implementation of the rules of chess, including underpromotion, the fifty-move rule, draw by repetition, and draw by insufficient material. Colossus was also able to execute all the basic checkmates, including the difficult bishop and knight checkmate.

=== Colossus Chess X ===
Colossus Chess X for MS-DOS

The program was subsequently ported to Atari ST (1988), Amiga (1989) and IBM PC (1990) under the title Colossus Chess X. The new releases featured four chess sets and enhanced graphics developed with the assistance of Gary Thomlinson and Carl Cropley. The opening book was extended to 11,000 positions, and the program had the ability to learn from past playing experiences.

=== UCI version ===
No work was done on Colossus Chess from 1991 to 2005, when Martin Bryant created a completely new and freely available Windows version conforming to the Universal Chess Interface. It was written in C#, then converted to C for speed, and was finally publicly released in 2006. As of April 2025, the latest version is 2025a.

== Reception ==
Info gave Colossus Chess IV for the Commodore 64 three stars out of five, stating that it was less attractive but "a darn sight more playable" than Chessmaster 2000 with both keyboard and joystick controls. The magazine warned of the difficulty of remembering the "shifted keyboard control sequences" and said it was "badly in need of a quick-reference card".
