= Claudico =

Artificial intelligence poker playing computer program

Claudico is an artificial-intelligence computer-program designed to play no-limit Texas hold 'em heads-up.

== History ==
Claudico was designed by Carnegie Mellon professor Tuomas Sandholm and his graduate students. The name means "I limp" in Latin, a reference to limping into a hand without raising—a strategy the bot employs often. Rather than have a professional poker player attempt to explain his strategy to the programming team, Sandholm had the computer attempt to devise the best strategy on its own. The task was so complicated that it required a Pittsburgh Supercomputing Center Blacklight supercomputer with 16 terabytes of RAM to complete.

In explaining his motivation for designing the bot, Sandholm said, "Poker is now a benchmark for artificial intelligence research, just as chess once was. It's a game of exceeding complexity that requires a machine to make decisions based on imperfect and often misleading information, thanks to bluffing, slow play and other decoys".

Originally called Tartanian, a version of the program won a July 2014 tournament against other computer programs.

The improved successor of Claudico is called Libratus. Like Claudico, Libratus is designed to compete against top human players.

== 2015 match against four human players ==
From April 24 to May 8, 2015, Claudico participated in an event at Rivers Casino in Pittsburgh, Pennsylvania. The bot faced each of four top human opponents—Dong Kim, Jason Les, Bjorn Li, and Doug Polk—in a series of heads-up matches. At the time, Polk was the world's number-one ranked heads-up player.

Each day featured two 750-hand matches over eight hours (plus breaks) against each of the humans, for a total of 20,000 hands per player over the course of 13 days (with one rest day in the middle). For each 750-hand set, the same hands were dealt to one human taking on Claudico on the main casino floor and another battling the computer in an isolation room, with the hole cards reversed. This was done to ensure that card luck was not a factor in the outcome. The 80,000-hand sample represented the largest-ever human–computer data set. Claudico was able to adjust to its opponent's strategy as the matches progressed, just as the humans could. The match winner was determined by the overall chip count after 80,000 hands; although individual results were kept for the four pros, they were competing as a single team. If the final chip count had been too close for the difference to be statistically meaningful, the match would be declared a draw.

The tournament carried a $100,000 prize pool, funded by Rivers Casino and Microsoft. The casino set up stands and video screens for the public to watch the action live. Additionally, the matches were broadcast online via Twitch. Highlights from the match will air throughout 2015 on CBS Sports Network's weekly show Poker Night in America.

Entering the event, Sandholm estimated that Claudico had a 50/50 chance to win. Polk, however, was confident the humans had the edge. He acknowledged that computers would likely surpass human play eventually, but said, "I hope we can make them go a few more rounds after this before they do, like Kasparov did". He said his strategy would "change more so than when playing against human players ... I think there will be less hand reading so to speak, and [fewer] mind games".

The blinds were 50 and 100 chips for every hand, and both the human's and computer's chip stack were reset to 20,000 at the beginning of each hand. Halfway through the match, the human team was ahead 458,000 chips versus Claudico. The humans went on to increase their lead, winning the match by 732,713 chips. Polk finished up 213,000, Li won 529,000, Kim beat Claudico by 70,000, and Les finished down 80,000. A total of 170 million chips were bet over the 80,000 hands. Polk said Claudico had played well in spots, but also made some bad plays. Overall, it played very differently than humans. "Where a human might place a bet worth half or three-quarters of the pot, Claudico would sometimes bet a miserly 10 percent or an over-the-top 1,000 percent", he explained. "Betting $19,000 to win a $700 pot just isn't something that a person would do".

== See also ==
- Computer poker players

- Cepheus (poker bot)
- Polaris (poker bot)
- Libratus
- Pluribus (poker bot)
