= Opa (programming language) =

Programming language for developing scalable web applications

- Paradigms: multi-paradigm: functional, imperative
- Developer: MLstate
- First appeared: 2011; 15 years ago
- Stable release: 1.1.1 (stable) / March 8, 2014; 12 years ago
- Typing discipline: static, strong, inferred
- Scope: lexical
- Implementation language: OCaml, Opa, JavaScript, Shell,C, Standard ML
- OS: Linux, macOS, Windows
- License: AGPLv3, MIT
- Website: opalang.org

Influenced by
- OCaml, Erlang, JavaScript

Opa is a programming language for developing scalable web applications. It is free and open-source software released under a GNU Affero General Public License (AGPLv3), and an MIT License.

It can be used for both client-side and server-side scripting, where complete programs are written in Opa and subsequently compiled to Node.js on a server and JavaScript on a client, with the compiler automating all communication between the two. Opa implements strong, static typing, which can be helpful in protecting against security issues such as SQL injections and cross-site scripting attacks.

The language was first officially presented at the Open Worldwide Application Security Project (OWASP) conference in 2010, and the source code was released on GitHub in June 2011, under a GNU Affero General Public License (AGPL). Later, the license changed to the MIT License for the software framework part (the library) and AGPL for the compiler, so that applications written in Opa can be released under any software license, proprietary or open source.

== Design and features ==
Opa consists of a web server, a database and distributed execution engine. Code written in Opa is compiled to JavaScript using Node.js on the server side and to JavaScript using jQuery for cross-browser compatibility on the client side. The advantage of the approach compared to certain Rich Internet Application (RIA) platforms is that users are not required to install a plugin in their browser. Opa shares motivations with web frameworks, but takes a different approach. Its designers assert that this helps Opa to avoid many security issues, like SQL injections or cross-site scripting (XSS) attacks.

The core language is functional and has a static type system with type inference. Opa also provides sessions which encapsulate an imperative state and communicate using message passing, similar to Erlang processes. Opa provides many structures or functions that are common in web development, as first-class citizen objects, for instance HTML and parsers, based on parsing expression grammars. Because of this adhesion between the language and web-related concepts, Opa is not intended for non-web applications (for instance desktop applications).

The 0.9.0 release in February 2012 introduced database mapping technology for the non-relational, document-oriented database MongoDB, similar to object-relational mapping. The 1.1.0 release in February 2013 also added support for PostgreSQL, paving the way for the support of several SQL databases.

== Hello world ==
jlog("Hello, World")

This second Hello World example makes a web application that also outputs "Hello, World".

server = Server.one_page_bundle("Hello World",
  @static_resource_directory("resources"),
  ~[],
  function() {
    <h1>Hello, World</h1>
  }
)

== See also ==
- Ur – a functional language for web development
- Dart – a JavaScript alternative for web apps
- Haxe – a similar language for web apps
- CoffeeScript – a language transcompiled to JavaScript for web apps
- Dark – a language integrating development and deployment of serverless services

== Bibliography ==
- Opa: Up and Running, 2013, O'Reilly Media ISBN 978-1449328856
