= Derek Oldbury =

British draughts player (1924–1994)

Derek Oldbury (1924 – July 1994), often known as DEO, was a British draughts player. He was a rival of Marion Tinsley and, after Tinsley, "probably the second best player of all time". Oldbury was interested in Go As You Please (GAYP) draughts, a variant where players have the liberty to select their own opening moves.

He competed in 7 world championship matches, winning in 1976, 1976 (GAYP) and 1991 (3-move).

Oldbury was from Devon. He was born with paraplegia. He wrote the six-volume The Complete Encyclopaedia of Draughts.
