= International Amateur Pair Go Championship =

International Go tournament

The International Amateur Pair Go Championship (IAPGC as known as IAPG CUP) is an international tournament for amateur Go players under the Pair Go rule, held once a year since 1990. This competition is partly on the international championship and partly on the Japanese national championship. The organising body is the Japan Pair Go Association (JPGA) and the International Amateur Pair Go Championship Executive Committee.

== History ==
Hisao Taki, the president of NKB inc. in traffic advertisement Industry, originated Pair Go and promoted first pair go championship named International Go Amateur Pair Tournament as known as the NKB Cup on December 23, 1990. However, this event is officially translated as 1st International Amateur Pair Go Championship in English. 64 players from 4 countries were invited in this event.

On November 24, 1991, 2nd International Amateur Pair Go Championship was held at Hotel Edmont in Tokyo. Since this event, the neme of event was fixed.

In 2008, Pair Go was one of the official sports in World Mind Sports Games. For this reason, 19th event was promoted in 2008 World Mind Sports Games.

In March 2010, "Pair Go 20th Anniversary WPGA Pair Go World Cup 2010 Hangzhou" was held in Hangzhou, China.

== Past champions ==
Year	Winner	2nd	3rd
1990	Shoji Komori (Japan)	Toshiyuki Sogabe (Japan)	Tomoyasu Fueno (Japan)
1990	Sachiko Minatogawa (Japan)	Chikako Nakamura (Japan)	Taiko Nakamura (Japan)
1991	Yu-Guo Xie (China)	Shoji Komori (Japan)	Toei Kanazawa (Japan)
1991	Cheng-Hua Zhang (China)	Sachiko Minatogawa (Japan)	Tomoko Kanai (Japan)
1992	Shoji Komori (Japan)	Yoichiro Matsuta (Japan)	Toshihiko Muraoka (Japan)
1992	Sachiko Minatogawa (Japan)	Tomoko Kanai (Japan)	Hisako Koike (Japan)
1993	Akira Yoshida (Japan)	Toshihiko Muraoka (Japan)	Shun Nagano (Japan)
1993	Tomoyumi Baba (Japan)	Kana Makiguchi (Japan)	Mutsumi Hayashi (Japan)
1994	Yukihide Sakai (Japan)	Sung-Soo Park (South Korea)	Masaaki Kanno (Japan)
1994	Yukari Umezawa (Japan)	Jung-Won Lee (South Korea)	Yuko Tsukuda (Japan)
1995	Hyo-Jin Kwun (South Korea)	Kai-Hin Chang (Taiwan)	Takashi Kuboniwa (Japan)
1995	Kyong-Bo Lee (South Korea)	Chih-Han Lin (Taiwan)	Yuki Imamura (Japan)
1996	Toshiyuki Sogabe (Japan)	Satoshi Koitabashi (Japan)	Shigeaki Ishihara (Japan)
1996	Chikako Nakamura (Japan)	Yasuko Imamura (Japan)	Sachiko Yoshioka (Japan)
1997	Hsiang-Jen Huang (Taiwan)	Kuniki Sato (Japan)	Hak-Yong Lee (South Korea)
1997	Shu-Chin Cheng (Taiwan)	Hong-Mei Fu (China)	Min-Jin Lee (South Korea)
1998	Sung-Kyun Park (South Korea)	Masayoshi Nagai (Japan)	Bungo Taga (Japan)
1998	Se-Sil Kim (South Korea)	Shoko Takanashi (Japan)	Naoko Goto (Japan)
1999	Bungo Taga (Japan)	Shoji Komori (Japan)	Shin-Young Kang (South Korea)
1999	Naoko Goto (Japan)	Yumiko Tanaka (Japan)	Se-Yong Kim (South Korea)
2000	Hyon-Chol Kim (North Korea)	Satoshi Hiraoka (Japan)	Koichi Shimohashi (Japan)
2000	Mi-Hyon Kwon (North Korea)	Yuriko Hiraoka (Japan)	Momoyo Sato (Japan)
2001	Chen Huang (China)	Dong-Seob Kim (South Korea)	Yoshiyuki Imabun (Japan)
2001	Wei-Jing Fan (China)	Ha-Jin Lee (South Korea)	Yasuko Imamura (Japan)
2002	Le-Ping Qian (China)	Minoru Harada (Japan)	Yong-Sam Mun (North Korea)
2002	Ni-Qiao Wang (China)	Kazuko Kanai (Japan)	Un-A Choe (North Korea)
2003	Nam-Hoon Kim (South Korea)	Bungo Taga (Japan)	Akio Ito (Japan)
2003	Se-Young Kim (South Korea)	Naoko Arai (Japan)	Miori Shimosaka (Japan)
2004	Pon-Gil Ri (North Korea)	Sung-Bong Ha (South Korea)	Satoshi Hiraoka (Japan)
2004	Sae-Byol Jo (North Korea)	Ji-Eun Kim (South Korea)	Yuriko Hiraoka (Japan)
2005	Fan Liu (China)	Seong-Hoon Kim (South Korea)	Kikou Emura (Japan)
2005	Nian-Nian Li (China)	Tae-Hyun Kim (South Korea)	Risa Sasako (Japan)
2006	Yu-Tae Seo (South Korea)	Lin Long (China)	Masaki Date (Japan)
2006	Ye-Seul Song (South Korea)	Ling Yan (China)	Fuko Fukasaka (Japan)
2007	Chang-Bae Kang (South Korea)	Kazumori Nagaya (Japan)	Sugitaro Saito (Japan)
2007	Hye-Lim Kim (South Korea)	Ayako Oda (Japan)	Tomoyumi Baba (Japan)
2008	Seok-Ui Hong (South Korea)	Tae-Won Jo (North Korea)	Tibor Pocsai (Hungary)
2008	Shin-Young Kim (South Korea)	Sae-Byol Jo (North Korea)	Rita Pocsai (Hungary)
2009	Sang-Heun Lee (South Korea)	Kazumori Nagoya (Japan)	Toshiaki Kushiro (Japan)
2009	Ye-Seul Song (South Korea)	Ayako Oda (Japan)	Kushiro Geishun (Japan)
2010	Song-Hong Suk (South Korea)	Satoshi Hiraoka (Japan)	Tsubasa Miyamoto (Japan)
2010	Yeon-Gju Lee (South Korea)	Yuriko Hiraoka (Japan)	Sayuri Hoshi (Japan)
2010 WC	He Xie (China)	Jin-Seuk Mok (South Korea)	Xing Liu (China)
2010 WC	Rong-Hui Song (China)	Min-Jin Lee (South Korea)	Yi Tang (China)
2011	Ho-Seung Lee (South Korea)	Ping-Sin Tseng (China)	Nobuyuki Tanaka (Japan)
2011	Hee-Sue Kim (South Korea)	Hsiao-Tung Lin (China)	Noriko Horimoto (Japan)
2012	Ho-Seung Lee (South Korea)	Satoshi Hiraoka (Japan)	Minoru Kuramoto (Japan)
2012	Yun-Jeong Jang (South Korea)	Yuriko Hiraoka (Japan)	Naoko Arai (Japan)
2013	Jun-Hak Jeon (South Korea)	Sheng-Cheih Lo (Taiwan)	Kazumori Nagaya (Japan)
2013	Soo-Young Kim (South Korea)	Hung-Ping Lin (Taiwan)	Ayako Oda (Japan)

== See also ==
- Go competitions
- Go players
- Rengo
