= Ur (programming language) =

Web development programming language

Ur, Ur/Web
- Paradigms: functional, reactive
- Family: ML, Haskell
- Designed by: Adam Chlipala
- First appeared: December 2014; 11 years ago
- Stable release: 20200209 / February 9, 2020; 6 years ago
- Typing discipline: static, row
- Platform: x86-64
- OS: POSIX
- License: MIT
- Filename extensions: .ur, .urs, .urp
- Website: impredicative.com/ur

Influenced by
- ML, Haskell

Ur, also called Ur/Web, is a multi-paradigm, high-level, pure, strict, functional programming language. It is a dialect of the language ML, designed for web development, created by Adam Chlipala at the Massachusetts Institute of Technology that one program can emit code for a server, web browser client, and SQL specific to a given database backend. The full implementation is free and open-source software released under an MIT License.

Ur has its start and roots in a superseded progenitor language named Laconic/Web, in 2006.

== Function ==
Ur supports a powerful kind of metaprogramming based on row data types.

Ur/Web is Ur plus a special standard library and associated rules for parsing and optimizing. Ur/Web supports construction of dynamic web pages and applications backed by SQL databases. The signature of the standard library is such that well-typed Ur/Web programs "don't go wrong" in a very broad sense. They do not crash during particular page generations, and may not:

- Suffer from any kinds of code injection attacks
- Return invalid HTML
- Contain dead intra-application links
- Have mismatches between HTML forms and the fields expected by their handlers
- Include client-side code that makes incorrect assumptions about the "Ajax"-style services that the remote web server provides
- Attempt invalid SQL queries
- Use improper marshaling or unmarshaling in communication with SQL databases or between web browsers and web servers

This type safety is just the foundation of the Ur/Web methodology. It is also possible to use metaprogramming to build significant application pieces by analysis of type structure.

The Ur/Web compiler also produces very efficient object code that does not use garbage collection.

SQL syntax templates embedded in the language facilitate the handling of tables.

Although the syntax is based on Standard ML the language includes concepts from Haskell with added type manipulation.

Ajax call/response is serialized through a monad called transaction (corresponds to Haskell's input/output (IO)) and its marshalling and decoding is encapsulated in the rpc function.

The browser client side includes functional reactive programming facilities using the (source a) type and a signal monad.

== Example program ==
This is a demo program showing client, server and database code with Ajax communication, from the web demos, with extra comments to outline each of the components:

Interface file (ML-like signature) with .urs extension:

(* the environment monad is called transaction, corresponds to Haskell's IO monad *)
val main : unit -> transaction page

Implementation file (.ur extension):

datatype list t = Nil | Cons of t * list t

table t : { Id : int, A : string }
  PRIMARY KEY Id

(* server side database access, called through AJAX XmlHttpRequest
                    encapsulated as ''rpc'' function (remote procedure call) *)
fun add id s =
    (* sql dml template with {[expression]} *)
    dml (INSERT INTO t (Id, A) VALUES ({[id]}, {[s]}))

fun del id =
    dml (DELETE FROM t WHERE t.Id = {[id]})

fun lookup id =
    (* haskell style monadic code *)
    ro <- oneOrNoRows (SELECT t.A FROM t WHERE t.Id = {[id]});
    case ro of
        None => return None           (* return is the ''monad'' lifting function *)
      | Some r => return (Some r.T.A)

(* ''check'' called by client side onClick event handler,
               so it will be compiled to JavaScript as page embedded client script *)
fun check ls =
    case ls of
        Nil => return ()
      | Cons (id, ls') =>
            ao <- rpc (lookup id);      (* Ajax call to server side *)
            alert (case ao of
                   None => "Nada"
                 | Some a => a
                 );
            check ls'

fun main () =
    idAdd <- source "";
    aAdd <- source "";

    idDel <- source "";

    (* generates web page with JavaScript inclusions *)
    return <xml><body>
      <button value="Check values of 1, 2, and 3"
              onclick={fn _ => let val mylist = 1 :: 2 :: 3 :: []
                               in
                                  check mylist
                               end
                               }/><br/>
      <br/>
      <button value="Add"
              onclick={fn _ => id <- get idAdd;
                               a <- get aAdd;
                               rpc (add (readError id) a)  (* Ajax call to server side *)
                               }/>
      <ctextbox source={idAdd}/>
      <ctextbox source={aAdd}/><br/>
      <br/>
      <button value="Delete"
              onclick={fn _ => id <- get idDel;
                               rpc (del (readError id))    (* Ajax call to server side *)
                               }/>
      <ctextbox source={idDel}/>
    </body></xml>

Project file (.urp extension), must contain an optional directive list followed by a listing of project modules:

# hash prefixed line comments
rewrite url Module1/main        # set root URL to Module1/main function
exe myexename
database dbname=test            # database attrib. and parameters
sql noisy.sql

$/list     # stdlib modules prefixed with "$/"
module2    # if used by module1 it must precede it
module1    # main module

- server side, page retrieving functions with no side effects (http GET method) are accessible through a URL as /ModulePath/functionName; they should have type (unit -> transaction page).
- To export a page which may cause side effects, accessible only via HTTP POST, include one argument of the page handler of type Basis.postBody.

Compile:

urweb module1   # looks for module1.urp

Execute as a web server (other modes are CGI, FastCGI, ...):

./module1.exe -p 8081   # -h : RTS options help

== Libraries ==
- The predefined API
- The standard library
- Per feature tests
- Ur wiki - Libraries and FFI bindings

== Special features and problems ==
- Record updating

datatype mystruc k v = Empty | Node of {Key: k, Value: v}

fun setKey [k][v] (* type polymorphism *)
           (_: ord k) (* implicit instance of class ord *)
           (callerErrNote: string) (k1: k) (my: mystruc k v) : mystruc k v =
   if k1 < kmin
   then error <xml>setKey: illegal k1 {[callerErrNote]}</xml>
   else case my of
             Node r => Node (r -- #Key ++ {Key = k1})
             | _ => error <xml>setKey: not a Node {[callerErrNote]}</xml>

corresponding signature (kind annotations (:::) implicit; (::) explicit):

con mystruc :: Type -> Type -> Type    (* two param. type constructor *)

val setKey : k ::: Type -> v ::: Type -> ord k -> string -> k -> mystruc k v -> mystruc k v

- Record fields ellipsis

  case my of
    Node {Key = k, ...} => doWhatever k
    | _ => ....

- Error "Substitution in constructor is blocked by a too-deep unification variable"

This error happens with types of arity > 0 in nested case or let clauses and disappears by type annotating the variables in the nested clauses.

== See also ==
- Opa, a language for combined frontend-backend development
