= Polaris (poker bot) =

Texas hold 'em poker playing program

Polaris is a Texas hold 'em poker playing program developed by the computer poker research group at the University of Alberta, a project that has been under way for 16 years as of 2007. Polaris is a composite program consisting of a number of bots, including Hyperborean08, the winner of the limit equilibrium series in the 2008 Association for the Advancement of Artificial Intelligence (AAAI) Computer Poker Competition. Polaris also contains a number of other fixed strategies, and chooses between these strategies during a match. Polaris requires little computational power at match time, so it is run on an Apple MacBook Pro laptop during competitions. Polaris plays only heads-up (two player) Limit Texas hold'em.

== Play against professionals ==
On July 23–24, 2007, Polaris played against poker professionals Phil Laak and Ali Eslami at the Hyatt Regency Hotel in Vancouver, B.C. The competition consisted of four duplicate matches, with 500 hands per match. In each duplicate match, the same cards were dealt to both pairs of players, human and bot, but with the seating reversed. This meant that if Polaris had poor hands in one half of the match against Laak, the other copy of Polaris would be getting good cards in the other half of the match against Eslami. This was done to reduce variance, or "luck factor", as neither team could say they got the worse set of cards. The two players were in separate rooms to eliminate the chance of the audience revealing information about the hands, which would be especially problematic in a duplicate match. Laak had previously played the Polaris predecessor Vexbot in 2005 in a prior tournament. Laak admitted to luck playing a part in his victory over Vexbot.

After roughly 64 hours, Polaris tied the first round, won the second and lost the last two. One of the lost matches was against a learning variant which tried to switch between a few styles of play, while all of the remainder were against large, static, randomized sets of rules which approximate a pair of Nash equilibrium strategies. Laak and Eslami split $1 for the two wins, and $2,500 for the draw.

On July 3–6, 2008, Polaris competed against six human professional poker players in the Second Man-Machine Poker Championship, held in Las Vegas at the 2008 Gaming Life Expo. Polaris defeated the human players with three wins, two losses and one tie. Each of the six sessions was a duplicate match of 500 hands against two different players, resulting in six thousand hands played. Across all six sessions, Polaris won 195 big blinds. The version of Polaris used in the 2008 match was much stronger than the 2007 version, both in the quality of the component strategies and in its ability to learn which component strategy to use.

== See also ==
- Association for the Advancement of Artificial Intelligence
- Computer poker players

- Cepheus (poker bot)
- Claudico
- Libratus
