= International Federation of Match Poker =

Non-profit governing body for poker

- Abbreviation: IFMP
- Location: Lausanne, Switzerland
- Region served: Worldwide

The International Federation of Match Poker (IFMP) is a non-profit organization whose stated purpose is to "serve as the global governing body for Match Poker". IFMP is incorporated as a legal entity pursuant to articles 60 to 79 of the Swiss Civil Code and is headquartered in Lausanne, Switzerland.

== History ==
IFMP was founded in Lausanne on April 29, 2009. IFMP is structured as an International Sports Federation and is recognized by the Court of Arbitration for Sport.

== Goals ==
The goals of IFMP are to promote the development of Match Poker worldwide and to secure its recognition as a Mind Sport based on strategic skill, played without any discrimination of race, sex and creed. IFMP also seeks to assist its national Member Federations in securing legislation that gives players the right to play poker safely and legally, both online and in bricks & mortar establishments.

=== Match Poker’s recognition as a ‘Mind Sport’ ===
In April 2010, IFMP secured provisional membership of the International Mind Sports Association (IMSA) at IMSA's annual congress in Dubai.

== Tournaments ==
As part of the first UK Mind Sports Festival, IFMP hosted its inaugural tournaments in November, 2011, in London’s County Hall: the IFP Duplicate Poker Nations Cup (now Match Poker Nations Cup), a team event contested by IFMP’s Member Federations, and the IFMP World Poker Championship, also called ‘The Table’, in which individual players compete for the title of World Champion. The only organisation to mount international tournaments using Duplicate Poker, in its own version known as Match Poker, IFMP staged the opening hands of the 2011 IFMP Nations Cup in the capsules of the London Eye.

== Membership ==
Membership of IFMP consists of national poker associations and federations from around the world. The IFMP currently has 60 national member federations, including the original seven member nations.

The seven founding member nations of IFMP, which today form the nucleus of its executive board, are:

- Confederação Brasileira de Texas Hold'em (Brazil)
- Dansk Pokerforbund (Denmark)
- Fédération Française des joueurs de Poker (France)
- Stichting Nederlandse PokerBond (Netherlands)
- Russian Sport Poker Federation (Russia)
- Ukrainian Poker Federation (Ukraine)
- UK Poker Federation (United Kingdom)

Additional national member federations that have joined IFMP since its foundation include:

- Asociacion de Poker Texas Hold'em de Argentina (Argentina)
- Armenian Poker Federation (Armenia)
- Poker Federation of Australia (Australia)
- Austrian PokerSport Association (Austria)
- Belarusian Sport Poker Association (Belarus)
- Poker Federation of Bosnia & Herzegovina (Bosnia & Herzegovina)
- Bulgarian Federation of Tournament Poker (Bulgaria)
- Canadian Poker Federation (Canada)
- Croatian Poker Players Association (Croatia)
- Federación Nacional de Poker Deportivo (Chile)
- Federations Costarricense de Poker Deportivo (Costa Rica)
- Cypriot Poker Federation (Cyprus)
- Asociace Pokerových Klubů o.s. (Czech Republic)
- Estonian Tournament Poker Federation (Estonia)
- Suomen Pokerinpelaajat Ry (Finland)
- Georgian Sport Poker Association (Georgia)
- Deutscher Poker Sportbund (Germany)
- Greek Poker Federation (Greece)
- Magyar Póker Szövetség (Hungary)
- Pókersamband Íslands (Iceland)
- Irish Poker Federation (Ireland)
- Japan Poker Association (Japan)
- Republic Federation of Amateurs and Poker Players (Kazakhstan)
- Sport Poker Federation of Kyrgyzstan (Kyrgyzstan)
- Latvian Sport Poker Federation (Latvia)
- Lithuanian Sports Poker Federation (Lithuania)
- The Macedonian Poker Federation (Macedonia)
- Federación Mexicana de Juegos de Cartas de Habilidad y Deportivas, A.C. (Mexico)
- Mongolian Sport Poker United Association (Mongolia)
- Pakistan Poker Federation (Pakistan)
- Federación Peruana de Poker FPP (Peru)
- Związek Pokera Sportowego (Poland)
- Federatia Romana de Poker (Romania)
- Serbian Poker Federation (Serbia)
- Poker zveza Slovenije (Slovenia)
- IFPo de España (Spain)
- The Swedish Poker Federation (Sweden)
- United States Poker Federation (USA)
- Asociación Poker de Venezuela (Venezuela)

== Internal structure ==
The supreme authority of IFMP is the Congress, the assembly of all the members of IFMP on a one-country-one-vote system. Congress meets once a year. The Executive Board of IFMP is elected by Congress for a period of three years and is the managing body of IFMP. The Board elects a President from among its members for a term of four years, which can be renewed. IFMP's first president was Anthony Holden.

IFMP's president and executive board take counsel, at their discretion, from an advisory board of poker players including, among others, Al Alvarez, Doyle Brunson, Humberto Brenes, Gus Hansen, Mel Judah, James McManus and Tom McEvoy.

== IFMP Books ==
IFMP established its own publishing imprint in association with Limehouse Books in November 2011. Its first title, published in August 2012, was The Rules of Poker, edited by David Flusfeder, chairman of IFP's Rules Committee.

== See also ==
- Mind Sports Organisation
- World Series of Poker
