= Cepheus (poker bot) =

Poker playing program

Cepheus is the first poker playing program that "essentially weakly solved" the game of heads-up limit Texas hold 'em. This was the first imperfect information game played competitively by humans to be essentially solved. It was developed by the Computer Poker Research Group (CPRG) at the University of Alberta and was introduced in January 2015 in a paper entitled "Heads-up limit hold'em poker is solved", published in Science by Michael Bowling, Neil Burch, Michael Johanson, and Oskari Tammelin.

Cepheus' strategy is very close to a Nash equilibrium strategy for heads-up limit Texas hold'em, as an optimal counter-strategy to Cepheus can only win 0.000986 big blinds per game on expectation (to go from "essentially" solving the game to just "solving" the game, one has to reduce this expected loss to precisely 0 big blinds per game). However, 0.000986 big blinds per game on expectation means that even if someone played against Cepheus for a lifetime, this person will not be able to say, with statistical significance, that they have won.

Public web access to observe and play against Cepheus is available.

== See also ==
- Artificial Intelligence
- Association for the Advancement of Artificial Intelligence
- Computer poker players

- Claudico
- Polaris (poker bot)
