= Pluribus (poker bot) =

Computer poker player

Pluribus is a computer poker player using artificial intelligence built by Facebook's AI Lab and Carnegie Mellon University. Pluribus plays the poker variation no-limit Texas hold 'em and is "the first bot to beat humans in a complex multiplayer competition". The developers of the bot published their results in 2019.

According to the Pluribus creators, "Developing a superhuman AI for multiplayer poker was the widely recognized main remaining milestone" in computer poker prior to Pluribus. Pluribus relies on offline self-play to build a base strategy, but then continues to learn in real-time during its online play. The base strategy was computed in eight days, and at market rates would cost about $144 to produce, much smaller than contemporary superhuman game-playing milestones such as AlphaZero. In AI, two-player zero-sum games (such as heads-up hold'em) are usually won by approximating a Nash equilibrium strategy; however, this approach does not work for games with three or more players. Pluribus instead uses an approach which lacks strong theoretical guarantees, but nevertheless appears to work well empirically at defeating human players. Across the competitions, Pluribus won an average of over 30 milli big blinds per game. Pluribus' self-learned play style avoids "limping" (calling the big blind), and engages in "donk betting" (ending a round with a call and starting the next round by betting) more often than human experts do.

Among expert poker players, Jason Les stated he felt "very hopeless. You don't feel like there’s anything you can do to win." Chris Ferguson stated "Pluribus is a very hard opponent to play against. It's really hard to pin him down on any kind of hand." Jimmy Chou stated "Whenever playing the bot, I feel like I pick up something new to incorporate into my game." In The Wall Street Journal, science editor Daniela Hernandez characterized Pluribus as "advanced at a key human skill — deception".

Playing No-Limit Hold'em against five professional poker players, Pluribus won an average of $5 per hand with winnings of $1,000 per hour, which Facebook described as a "decisive margin of victory."

Following the victory, the developers declined to release the source code, out of fear it would be misused to surreptitiously cheat against human poker players in online matches.
