= Food festivals in South Korea =

South Korea annual food festival

The Food Festivals of South Korea are a series of celebrations that provide insight into Korean cuisine and culture. The cuisine ranges from traditional dishes through to modern interpretations and will often focus on regionally specific recipes and ingredients. They seek to retain Korean cultural identity, raise awareness, and promote local produce, cuisine, and the Korean food industry. Over time, some festivals and dishes such as Chimaek have become part of modern Korean culture and were further popularized by K-dramas.

== Annual Food Festivals ==
=== Food Festivals in Spring ===
==== Boseong Green Tea Festival ====
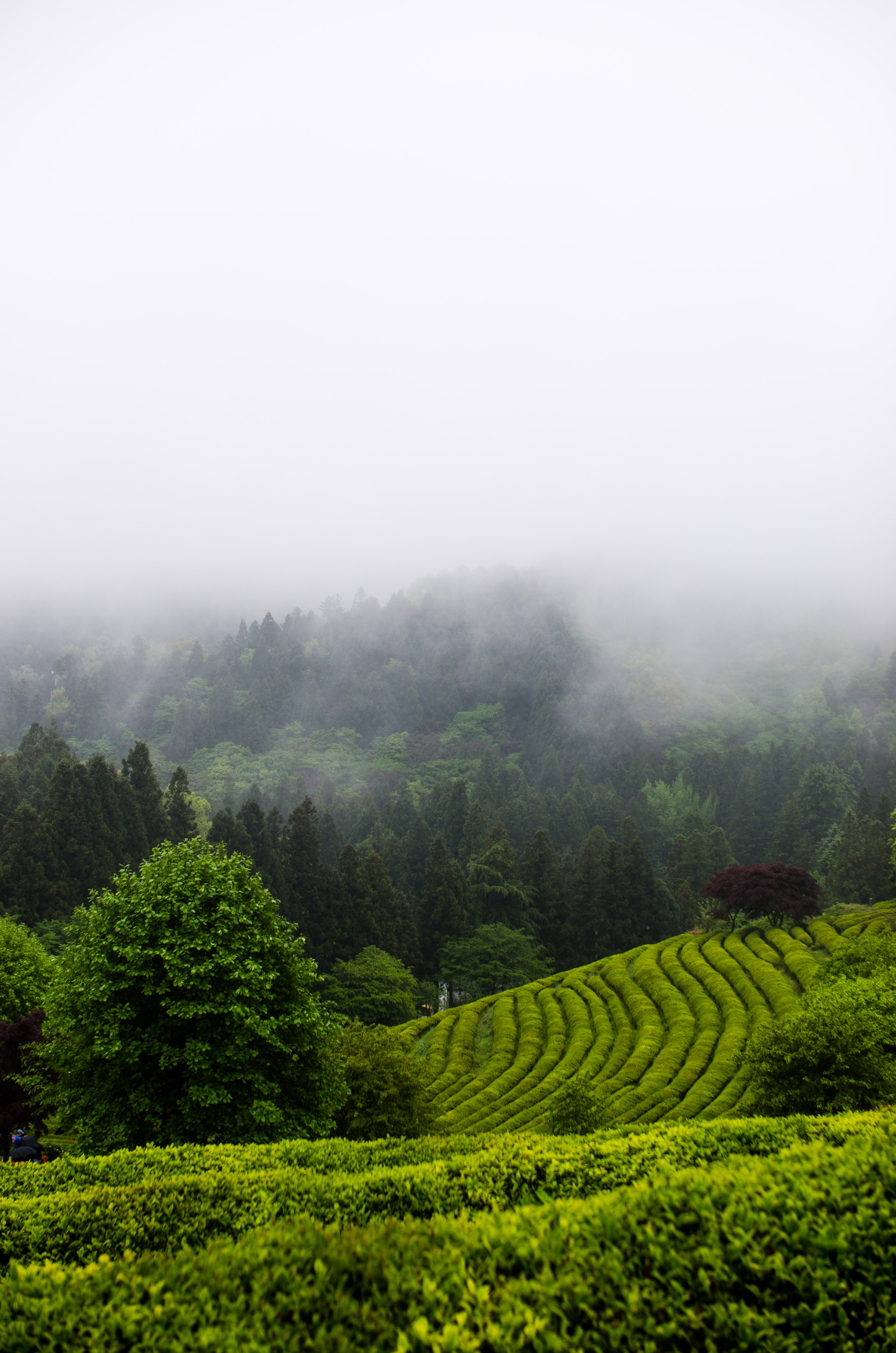
A foggy morning at the annual Green Tea Festival held in Boseong, South Korea.

Historically, Boseong has been known for its high-quality green tea. The county boast of one of the best topological and weather conditions for growing green tea. The month of May witnesses an increase in visitors to the areas of Korean Tea Culture Park, especially Boseong County. The annual Boseong Green Tea Festival is held during the time when green tea leaves are harvested, called haetcha (Hangeul: 햇차). The festival hosts tea-themed programs and activities, such as a tea ceremony, tea making, harvest rituals and tea picking. These activities are popular among the Koreans as well as international visitors. Trekking in the green tea farms, tasting cuisine made from green tea, and witnessing the green tea door bath are some of the other attractions of this festival. Visitors also visit nearby attractions such as Daehan Dawon Tea Plantation, Yulposolbat Beach, Yulpo Seawater Green Tea Centre.

=== Food festivals in Summer ===
==== Daegu Chimac Festival ====
In July, the Daegu Chimac Festival takes place at Duryu Park in Dalseo District, Daegu. The term "chimac" is a portmanteau of chicken and maekju (meaning "beer"). There were over 880,000 visitors in 2015, and one million visitors during the festival in 2016. During the festival the city's Duryu park is filled with citizens enjoying chi-maek and music in the outdoors performed by artist, DJs, etc. The festival kicks off with a "memorial service" for chickens and continue on for five days. Visitors taste chicken cooked in various different ways along with beers from all around the world as many fried chicken franchise take part in the festival. Since this festival is held in summer visitors enjoy chimaek in an ice-cold footbath. Other activities are the Chimac 99 toast time (an event held at 9:09pm where all the participants toast together), Chimac Cooking Competition, Chimac Ice Pub and Chimac busking. Participants and visitors also visit the nearby attractions like Palgongsan Mountain cable car, Modern Cultural Street and Seomun market.

==== Bonghwa Eun-uh (Sweetfish) Festival ====
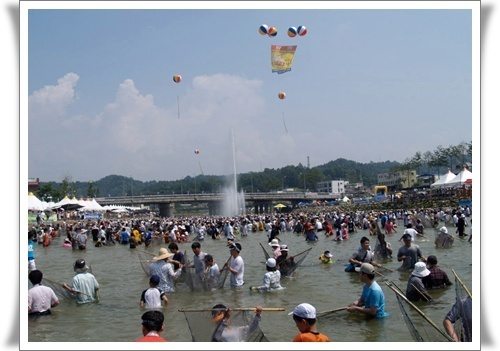
Bonghwa Euneo (sweet fish) Festival

At the end of July, Naeseongcheon stream, Naeseongcheon Stream sports park in Bonghwa-gun and North Gyeongsang Province are the destination for Sweetfish festival. The festival holds many activities which can be enjoyed with family and friends. One can experience various ways of catching sweetfish with bare hands or with scoop nets from water tank to catching sweetfish from chilling and clean stream of Naeseongcheon. These catches are charbroiled to eat later. The festival also offers many water sports for visitors.

==== Chuncheon Dakgalbi & Makkuksu Festival ====
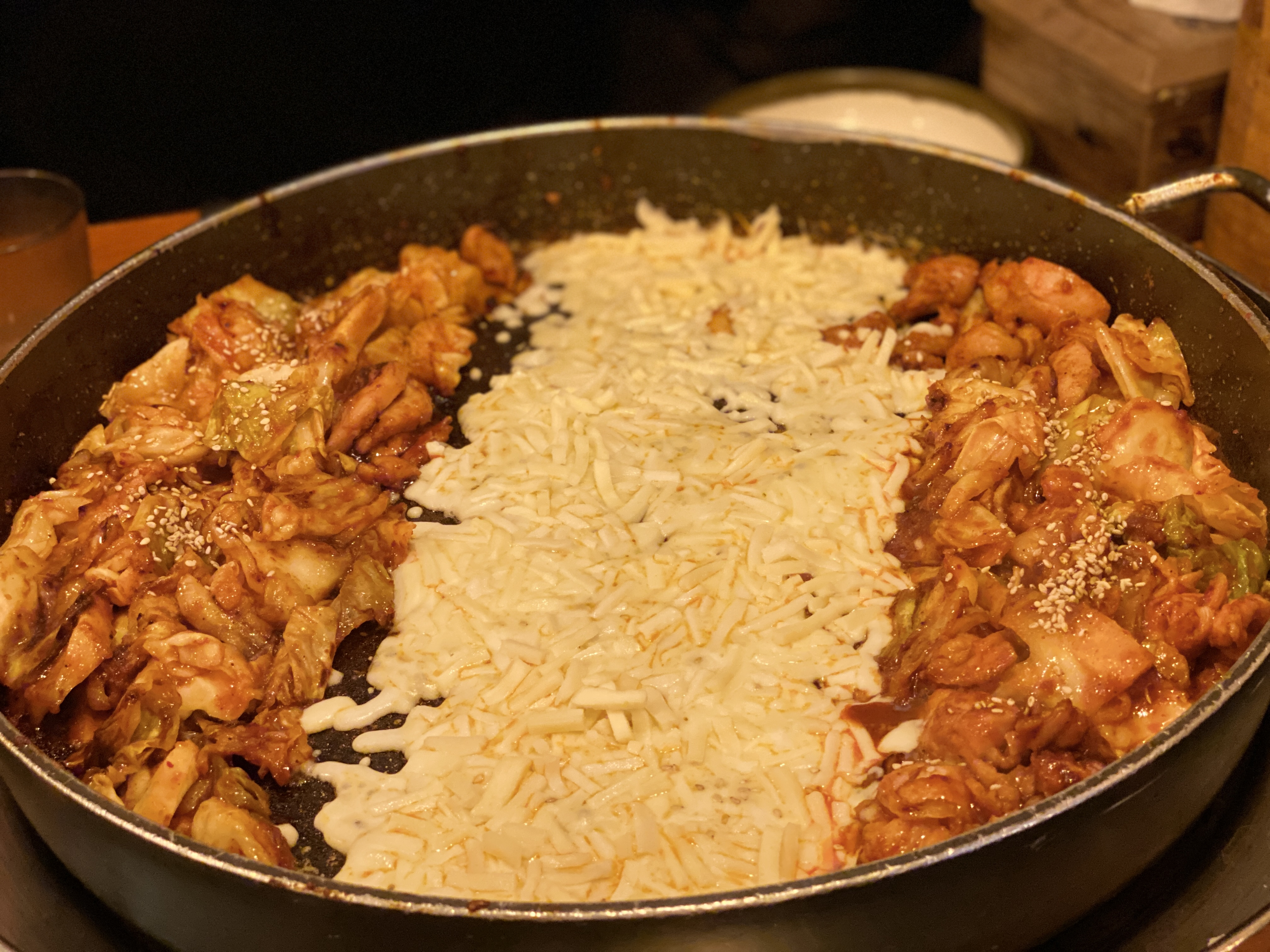
Cheese Dakgalbi

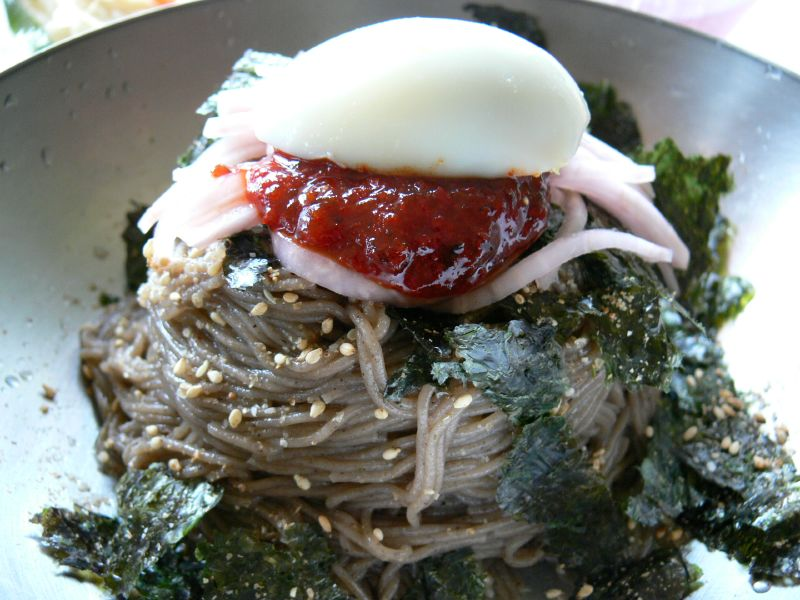
Makguksu (Korean Buckwheat noodles)

Every year between August and September, a Dakgalbi (spicy grilled chicken) and Makguksu (buckwheat noodles) festival is held in Chuncheon, Gwangwon-do province, the hometown of the two dishes. Many programs like food sampling, making makguksu and a makguksu eating contests are offered at the festival.

=== Food festival in Fall ===
==== Geumsan Insam Festival- Sept-Oct ====
Korea is the birthplace of Goryeo Insam (Korean ginseng), and the ginseng from Geumsan is specially well known for its quality with over a thousand years of history. Every year a ginseng festival is held in Geumsan in South Chungcheong province around Chuseok (Autumn harvest day; August 15 by the lunar calendar). The festival offers visitors to see the cultivation and processing of ginseng, learn about its benefits through the various exhibitions and experience the traditional culture of the community. Popular events include selecting ginseng seeds to harvesting ginseng, ginseng footbath to ginseng cooking contest, making medicine using ginseng to traditional massage and more. Visitors also go to the nearby tourist spot such as Garden of Sky and Daedunsan Provincial Park while returning from the festival.

==== Songi Mushroom Festival ====
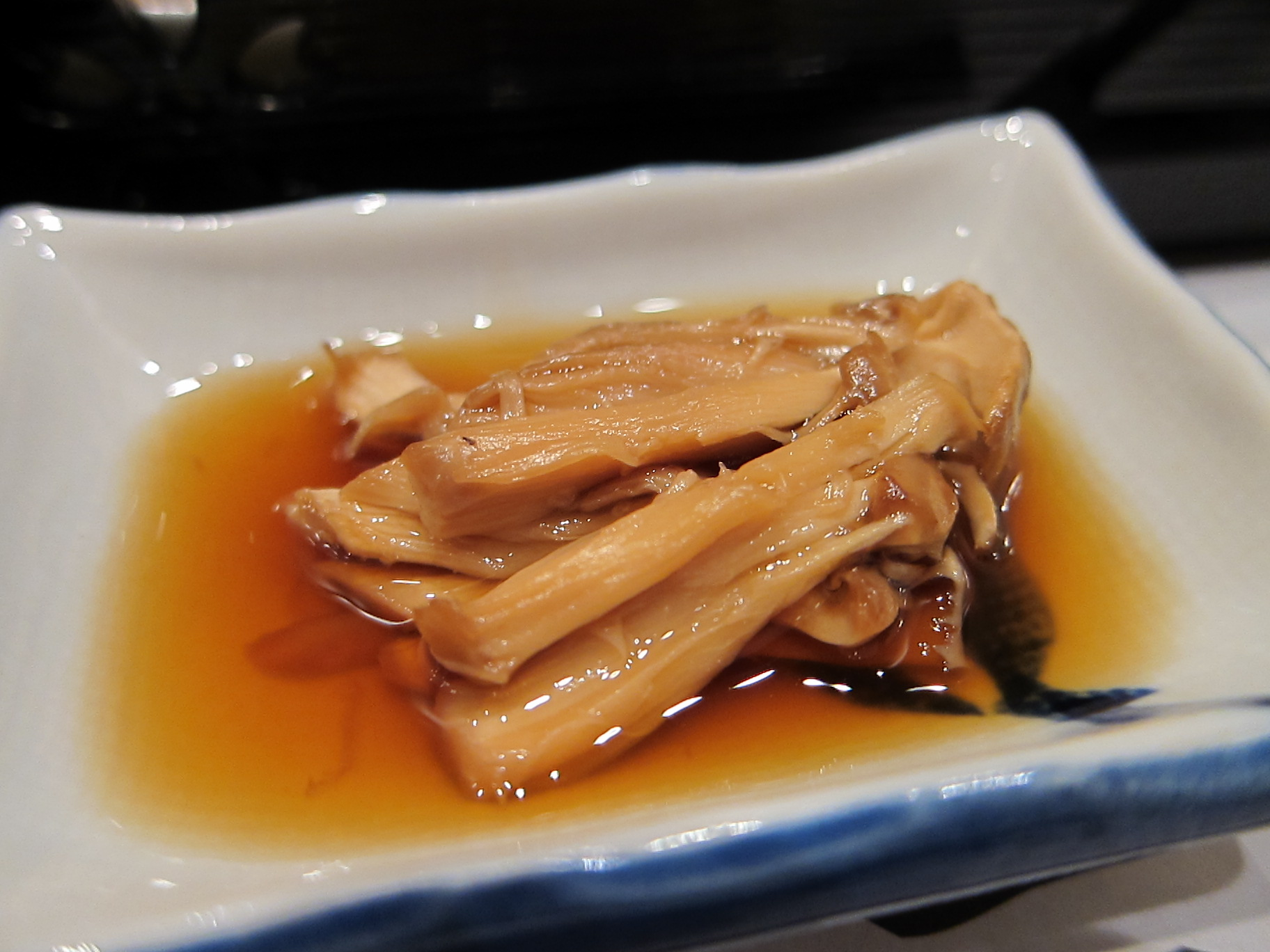
Songi-jorim (simmered pine mushrooms)

The Yangyang Songi mushroom festival, held sometime between late September and early October, offers visitors the opportunity to see and pick mushrooms by themselves in the mushrooms' natural habitat. Songi or pine mushroom is a precious mushroom hence often referred to as "golden mushroom" and "diamond in the tree". Events and programs in the festival include the Sansinje rituals, picking mushrooms, sampling mushroom cuisine and making Songcheon rice cake.

==== Jinan Red Ginseng Festival ====
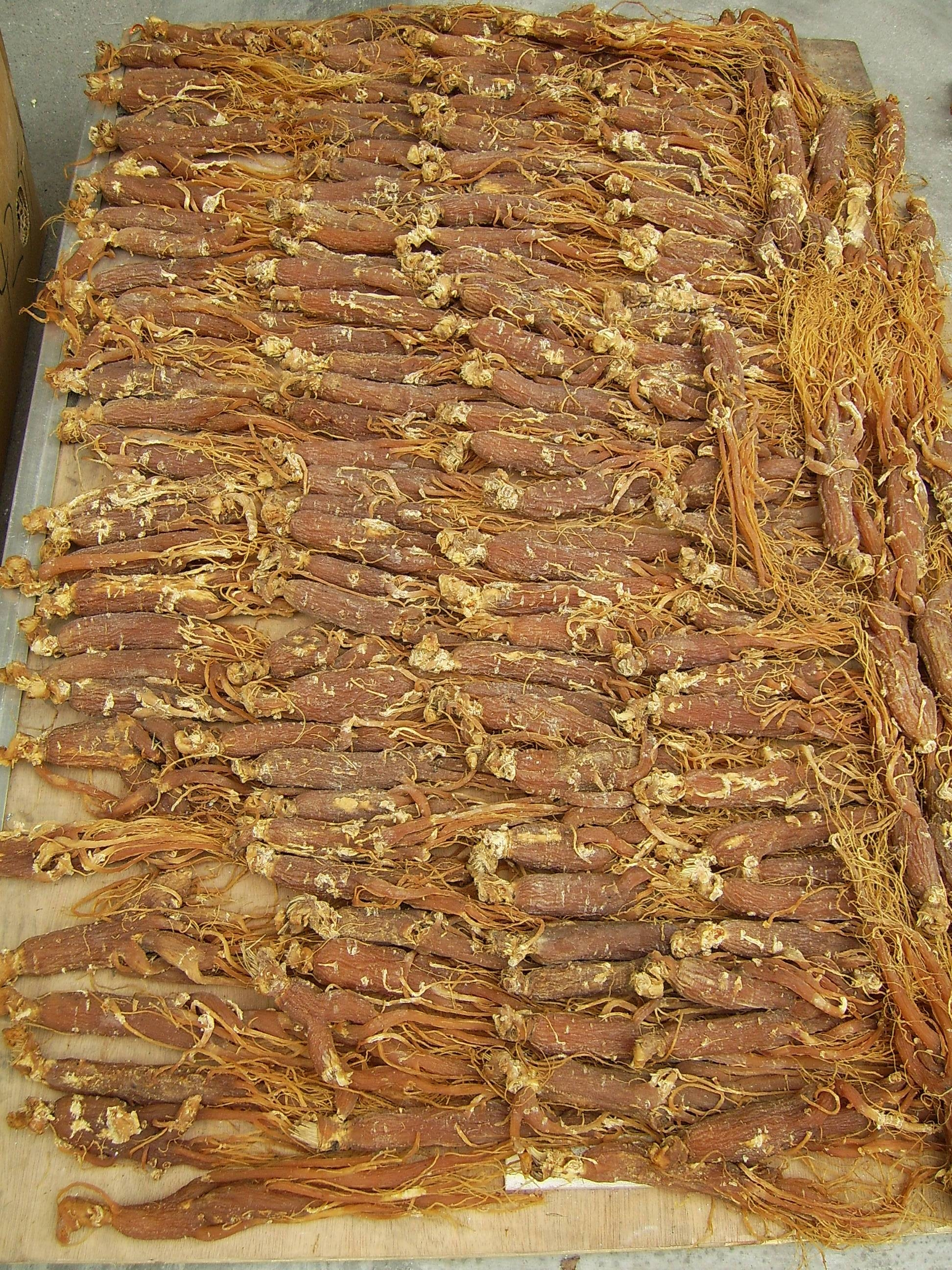
Korean Red ginseng

The festival is held in the beginning of October every year in the Northern area of Maisan in Jinan County, North Jeolla Province. Jinan in Korea is a designated special district for the production of Hangsam (Hangeul:홍삼), red ginseng. This festival is designed to spread awareness and knowledge about red ginseng. The activities in the festival ranges from sampling high-quality red ginseng and trying menus and products made with them. The festival extends out to give more authentic and traditional experience for the visitors such as royal martial arts, traditional performances, music festivals.

==== Imsil N Cheese Festival- Beginning of October ====
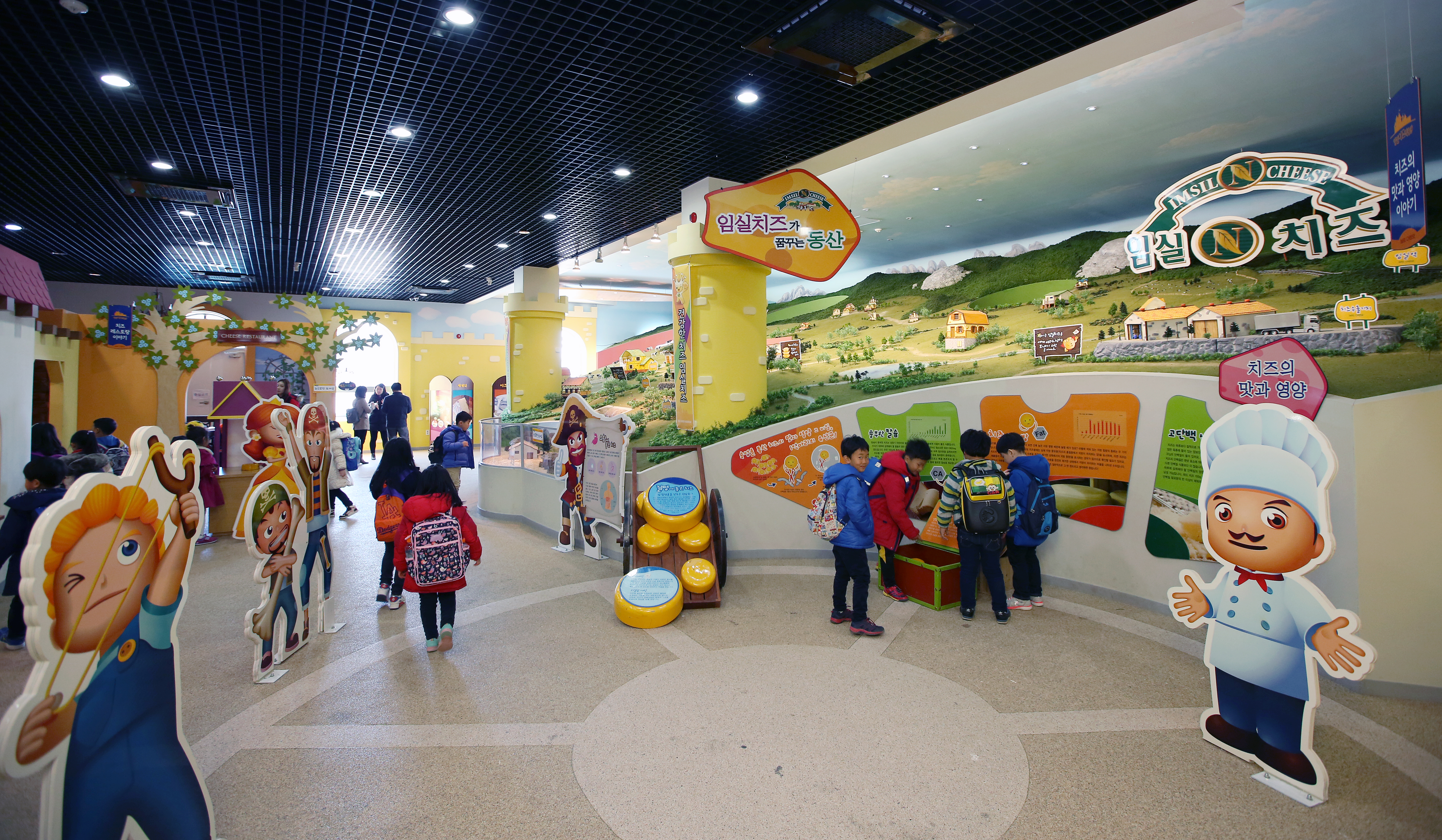
Imsil Cheese Theme Park

The festival is held in Imsil Cheese Theme Park and Imsil Cheese village in Imsil, a town historically related to production of cheese dating back to 1958. Throughout the event cuisines and products made with indigenous ingredients are available. The festival has 84 different programs of cheese making, cheese themed cooking shows, performances for children, EDM party and also parade during the night. Visitors often visit Imsil Hyanngyo Confucian academy, Okjeongho Lake, Guksabong Okjeongho overlook.

==== Gangneung Coffee Festival- Beginning of October ====
Every fall Gangneung in Gangwon Province holds the coffee festival and hosts many celebrity barista making it the center for coffee culture. The festival is held in the Gangneung Ice arena and Anmok beach. This event provide opportunity for upcoming baristas and coffee houses as the festival activities also involve coffee tasting events for free and hosts seminars providing expertise and knowledge from coffee masters and contests are also held for different categories like brewing, roasting, latte art etc. Other than these, concerts and cultural events are also organized. Nearby attractions are Ojukheon House, Gyeongpo Beach and Haslla Art world.

==== Icheon Rice Cultural Festival ====
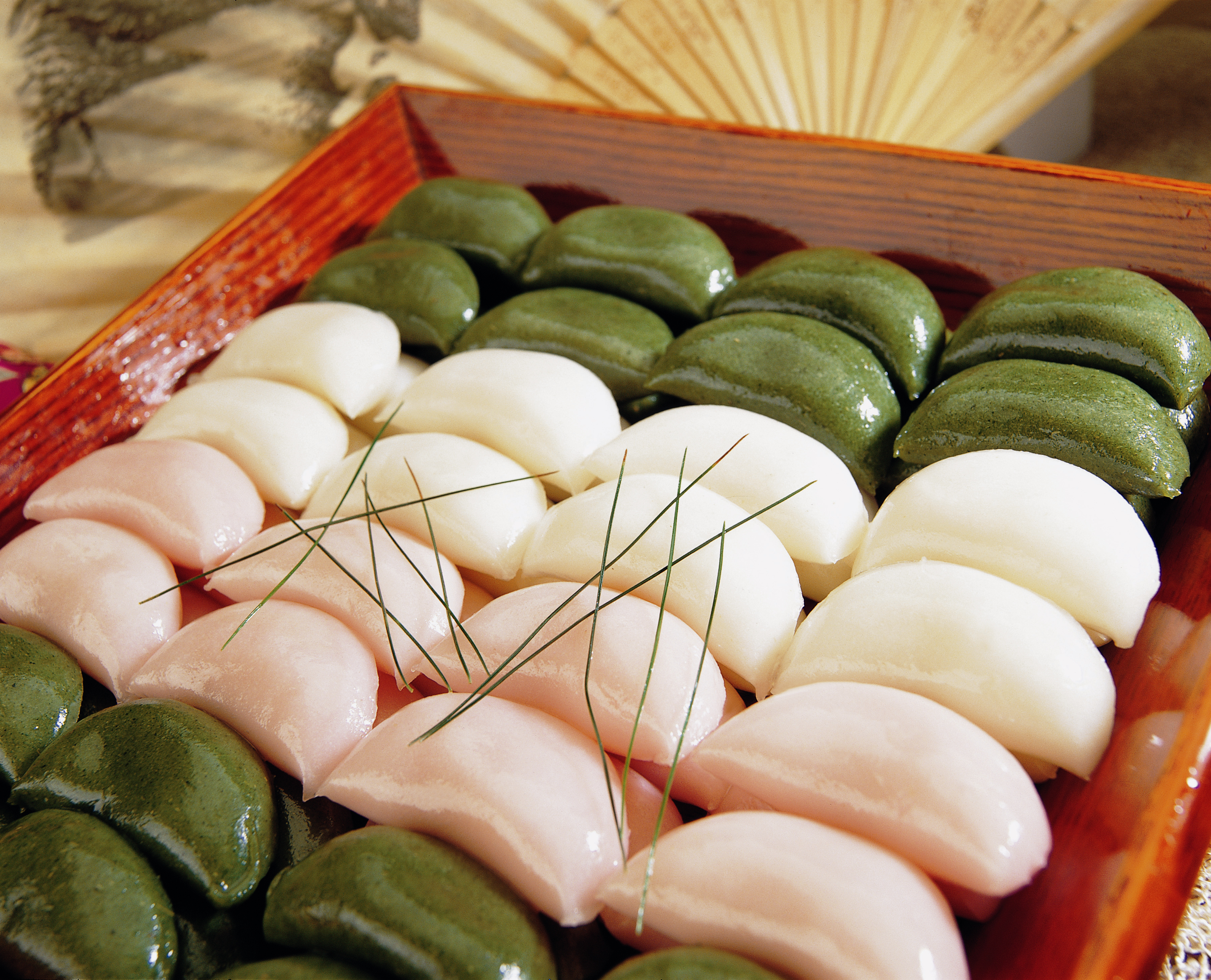
Songpyeon

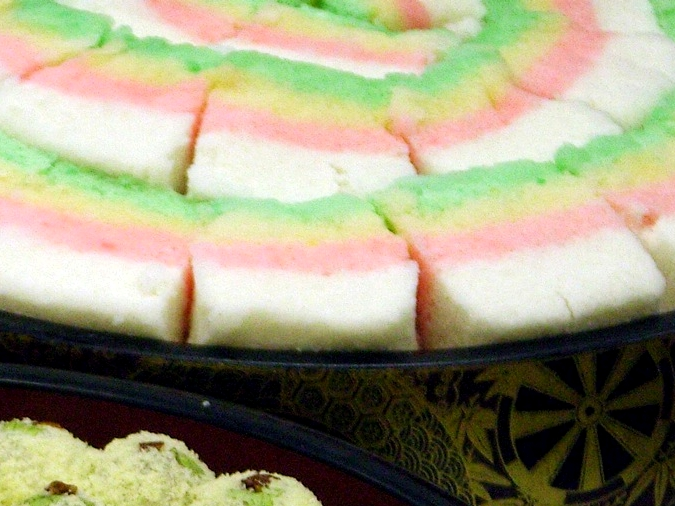
Korean rice cake- Mujigae tteok

Icheon in Gyeonggi province well known as the city of rice, hosts an agriculture festival every fall around the end of October. Through the festival visitors experience the flavor of Icheon rice and various aspects of the Korean traditional farming culture including threshing, planting; Fairy tale section, craft making, parade, Songpyeon making (half moon shaped rice cake) and Mujigae garaetteok (rainbow rice cake) making with Icheon Rice as long as 600m. Other popular event includes a Thanksgiving ritual and an international rice cooking contest.

==== Yeoju Ogok Naru Festival- October ====
This festival is quiet different from other festivals as rather than focusing on a particular food this festival is for all produce grown in Yeoju, which is well known for its high-quality rice, grains and sweet potatoes. Visitors experience different themes from locally grown crops, parties, ferry, folk culture and also have hands-on experience in harvesting different produce and use it to making various dishes like Bibimbap (Hangeul: 비빔밥). Visitors also visit the market Ogok Jangteo for sample tasting and purchasing indigenous Yeoju produce.

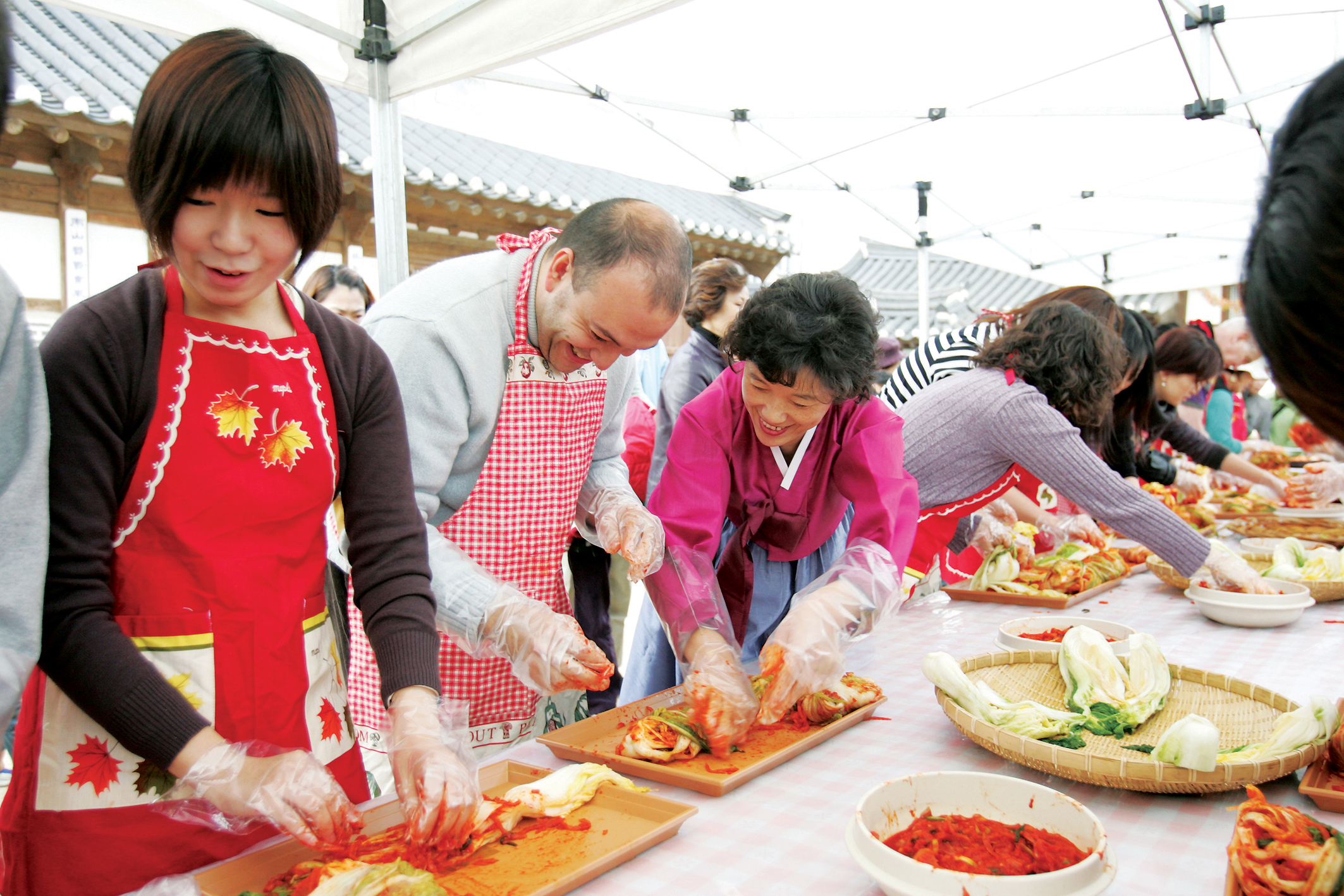
Foreigners making Kimchi

==== Gwangju World Kimchi (김치) Festival- October ====
The Gwangju World Kimchi festival is targeted at both local and international tourists. It introduces and promotes Korea's Kimchi to overseas audiences, and also offers diverse experience programs, events, market, and more other special features of the festival include the Kimchi Exhibition hall and Kimchi Master contest. Foreign participants particularly enjoy the Foreigners Kimchi making contest.

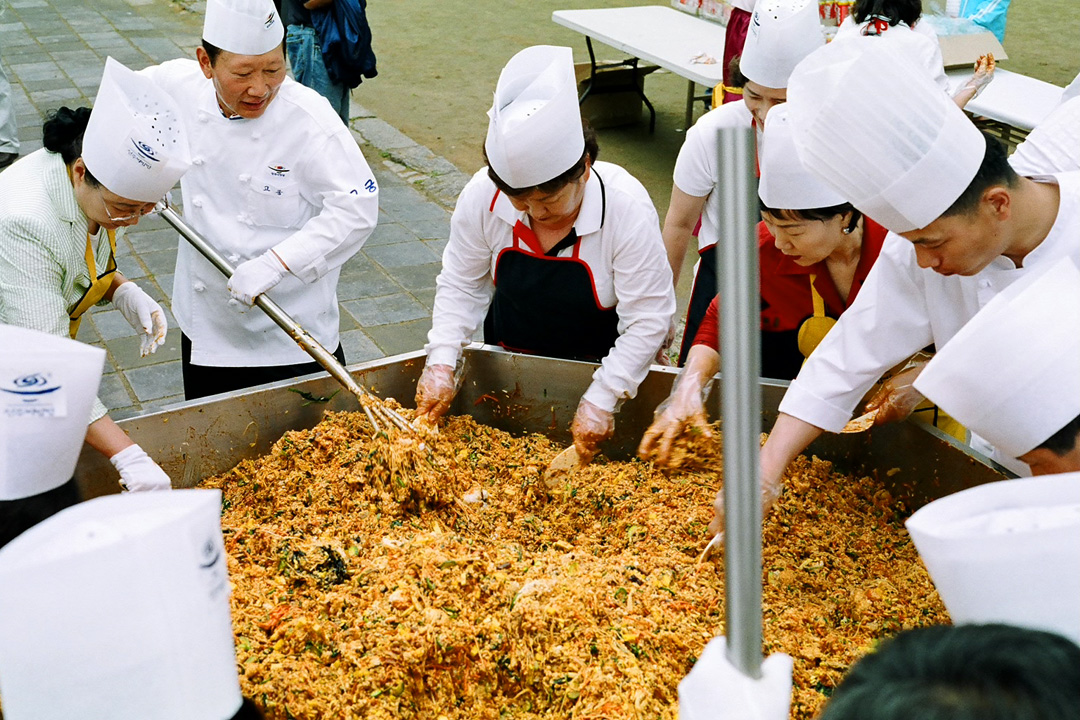
Jeonju Bibimbap Festival

==== Jeonju Bibimbap (비빔밥) Festival- October ====
The National Intangible Heritage Centre and at the Hanok village in Jeonju the gastronomic capital of Korea, a festival is held every October promoting Jeonju's representative food, Bibimbap. Jeonju Bibimbap is usually topped with quality Jeonju soy bean sprouts, hwangpo-muk, gochujang, jeopjang, and seasoned raw beef and served with kongnamul-gukbap. The rice of Jeonju bibimbap is specially prepared by being cooked in beef shank broth for flavor and finished with shiteme oil for flavor and nutrients. Many local cooks and public figures introduce their own unique variation of Bibimbap along with other local cuisines. Major programs include the gigantic Bibimbap made by all the participants- capable of feeding a 1000 people, a cooking contest for foreigners and an event called find Bibimbap.

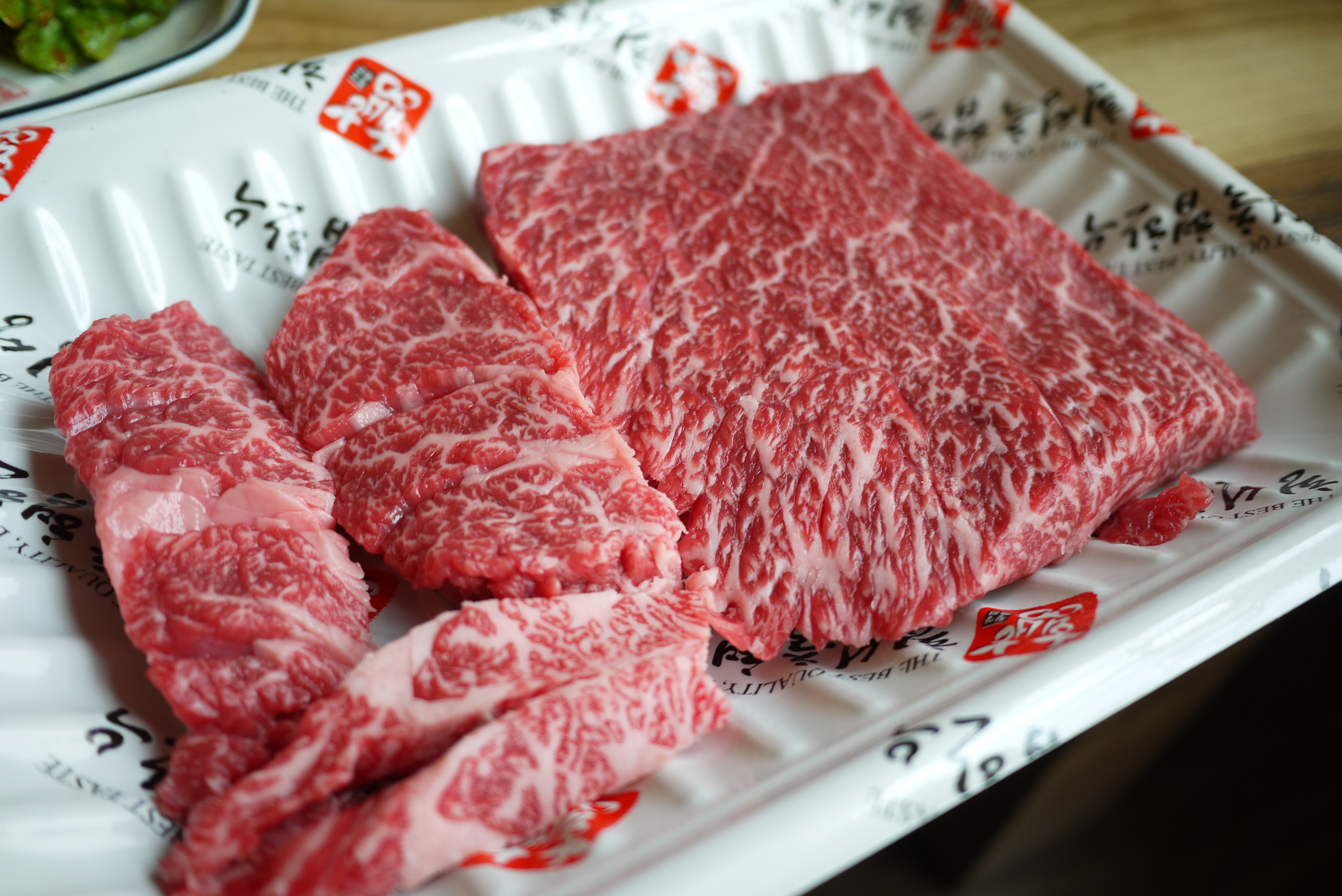
Hoengseong hanu

==== Hoengseong Hanu Festival ====
In the month of October Hanu (Hangeul: 한우, Korean beef) festival is held in Hoengseong, the largest Korean beef festival. This festival offers Balgol performance, parade, LED light festival, fireworks, EDM party with dining area for over a thousand visitors with barbeque place, sampling booths and signature dishes at an affordable prices. Visitors also go to the neighboring tourist destination like Hoengseong National SoopCheWin, Hoengseong Recreational Forest and Welli Hilli Park.

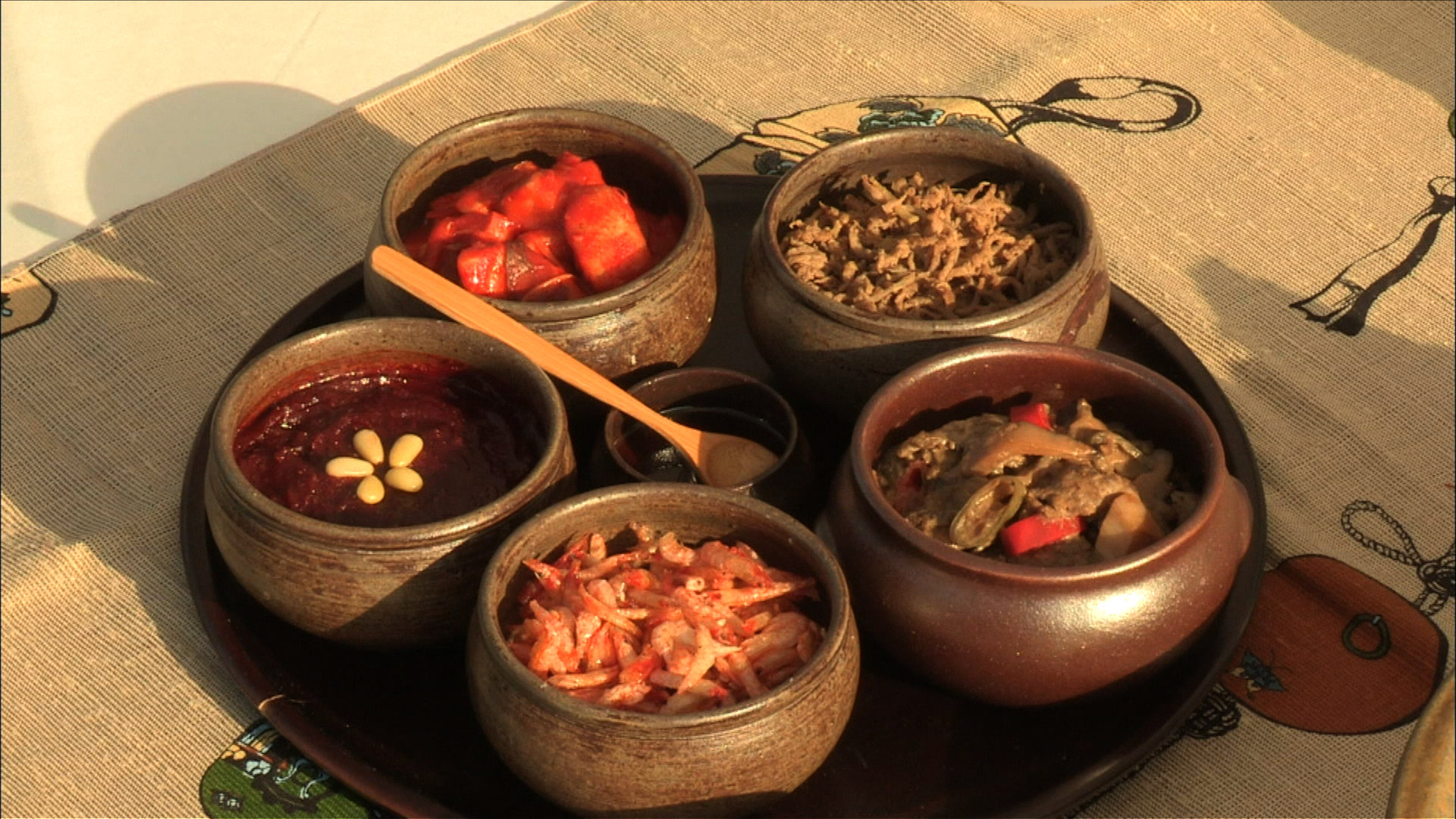
Korean condiments: gochujang, jeotgal (salted seafood), jangajji (pickled vegetables), kimchi

==== Sunchang Fermented Food Festival ====
Sunchang Fermented Food festival is held in October. The region of Sunchang is where gochujang (Korean chilli paste) served at the royal palace during the Joseon period was first made. The place has made a name for its methods of making traditional condiments, jang (장), and are carefully preserved till this day. Every fall this festival showcase the top three fermented food of Korean gochujang and other traditional condiments, Kimchi, Jeotgal (salted and fermented seafood), Tteokbokki (stir fried rice cakes) made with gochujang. Additionally, sixty different programs are held for visitors such as hands-on programs, cultural performances, exhibitions, craft making program for kids and markets where visitors purchase various fermented condiments made in a traditional way by masters at the Sunchang Traditional Gochujang Village.

==== Cheongsong Apple Festival- Between the end of October and Beginning of November ====
During fall, the festival is held in Cheongsong County, Gyeongsang province to celebrate the apple harvest. The festival also has its own unique games like "Finding the Golden Apple", and experiences like making apple jam by participating in "Apple Nanta", in addition to parades, sports events, and masquerade.

== Some special mentions: Food attraction in festivals ==
There are many festivals in South Korea and often times, due the reason that they attract a lot of visitors, the locals introduce many indigenous specialities including local favorite food or unique delicacies. Below are some Korean local delicacies from some well known festivals:

Suwon Galbi from Suwon Hwaseong Cultural festival is a grilled seasoned beef rib.

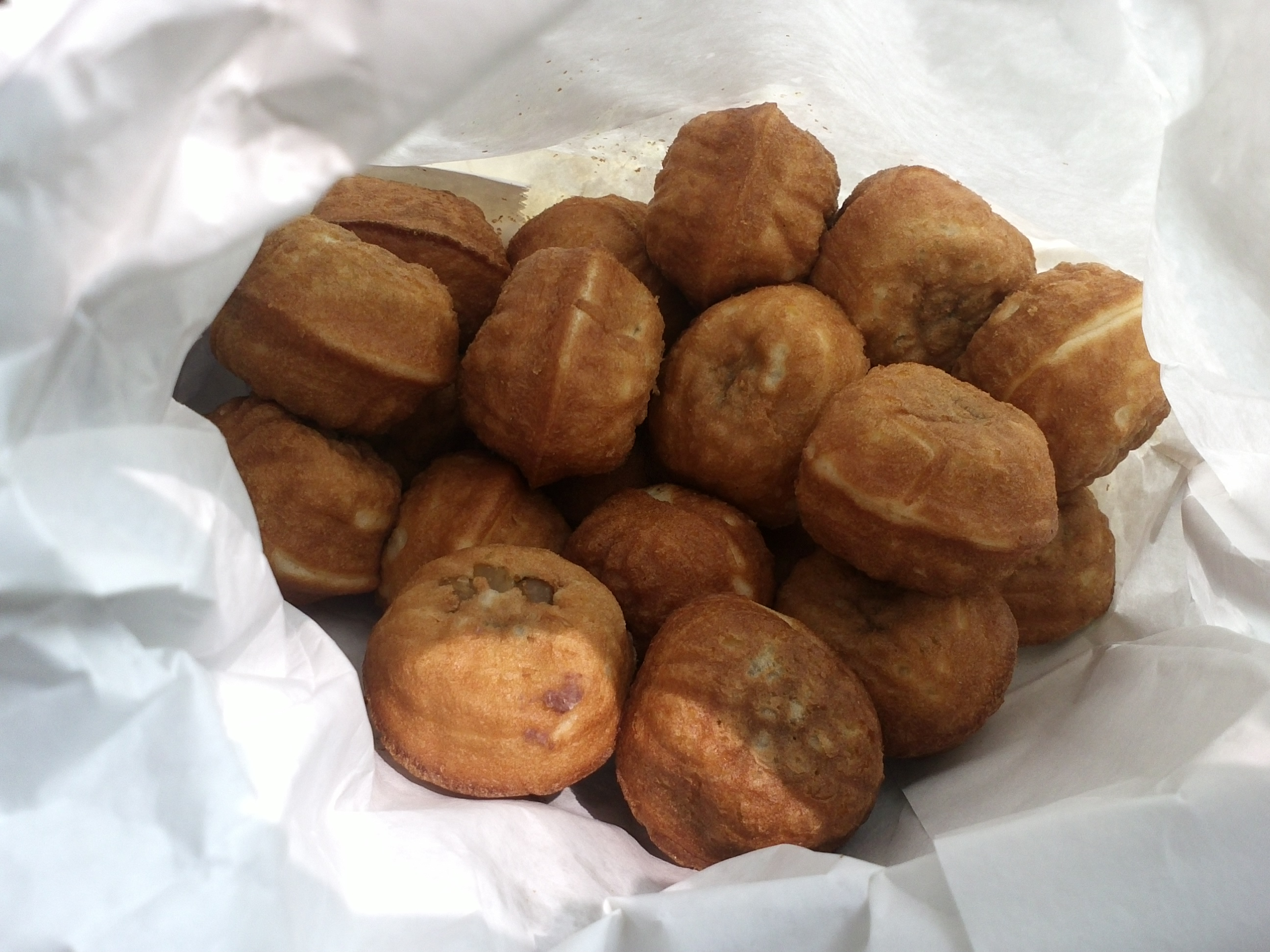
Hodugwaja

Hodugwaja from Cheonan World Dance festival is a type of baked walnut sweet pastry with red bean paste.

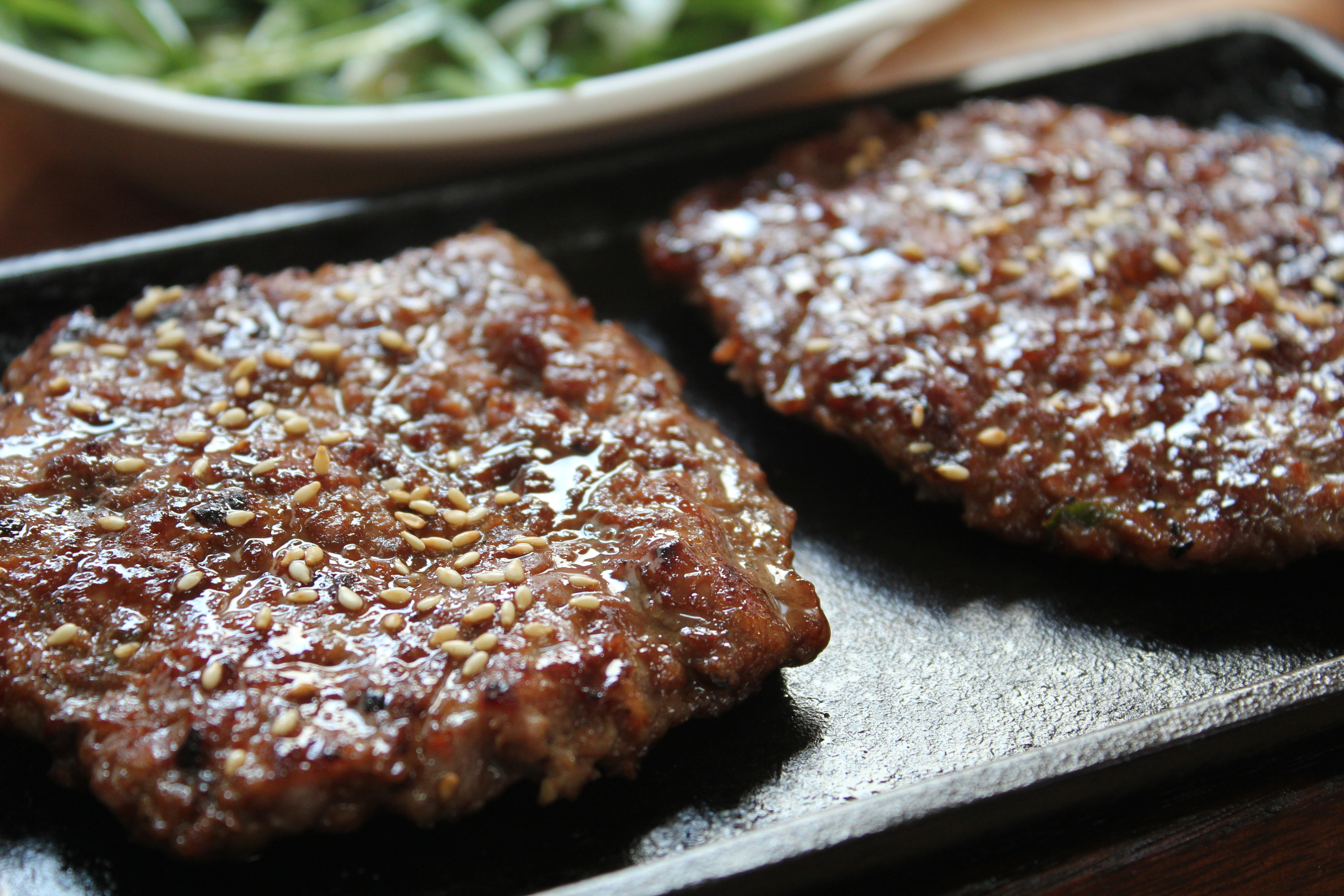
Tteok-galbi (grilled short rib patties)

Tteokgalbi from Damyang Bamboo festival is a dish made with beef, where the marinated beef is grilled with vegetables and is often eaten with steam rice.

Heukdwaejigugi from Jeju Fire Festival is a delicacy grilled on charcoal made with local bred black pork of Jeju with high marbling and thin fat.

Chuncheon Dakgalbi from Chuncheon International Mime festival is a stir fried dish made with chicken, vegetables and a special spicy sauce on a large iron plate which raises the heat.

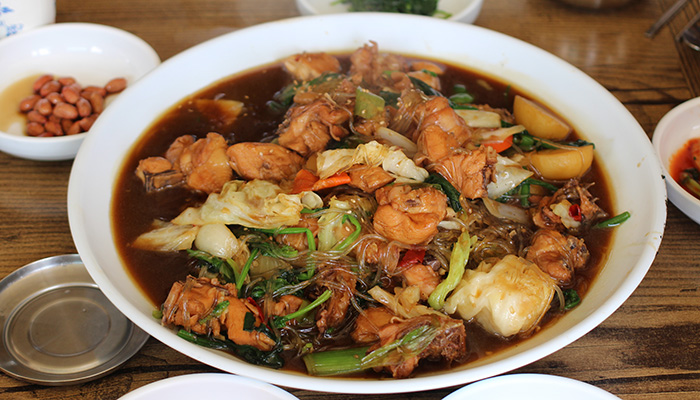
Andong-jjimdak

Andong Jjimdak from Andong Mask Dance festival is a local sweet, salty and savory delicacy made with soy sauce marinated chopped chicken simmered with shiitake mushroom, potatoes and dried red chili.

Maeungalbijjim from Daegu Yangnyeongsi Herbal Medicine festival is a steamed pork meat cooked with sweet and spicy sauce with a little soupy base and pepper flakes. This delicacy is also available in Daegu Chimac festival.

Dwaejigukbap from Gwangalli Eobang festival is a soup made with pork broth and steamed rice.

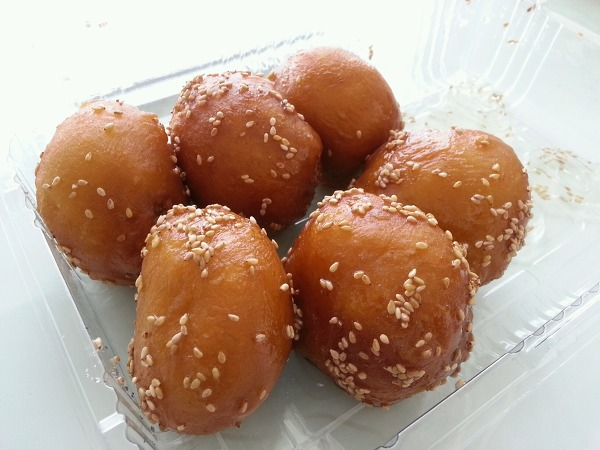
Tongyeong-kkulppang (Tongyeong honey bread)

Kkulppang from Tongyeong Hansan Battle festival also known as honey bread, is a sticky, sweet bread traditionally filled with sweetened red bean paste with a coating of Korean grain syrup, jocheong (Hangeul: 조청).

== See also ==
- Korean cuisine
