= Wanju County =

Wanju
- County
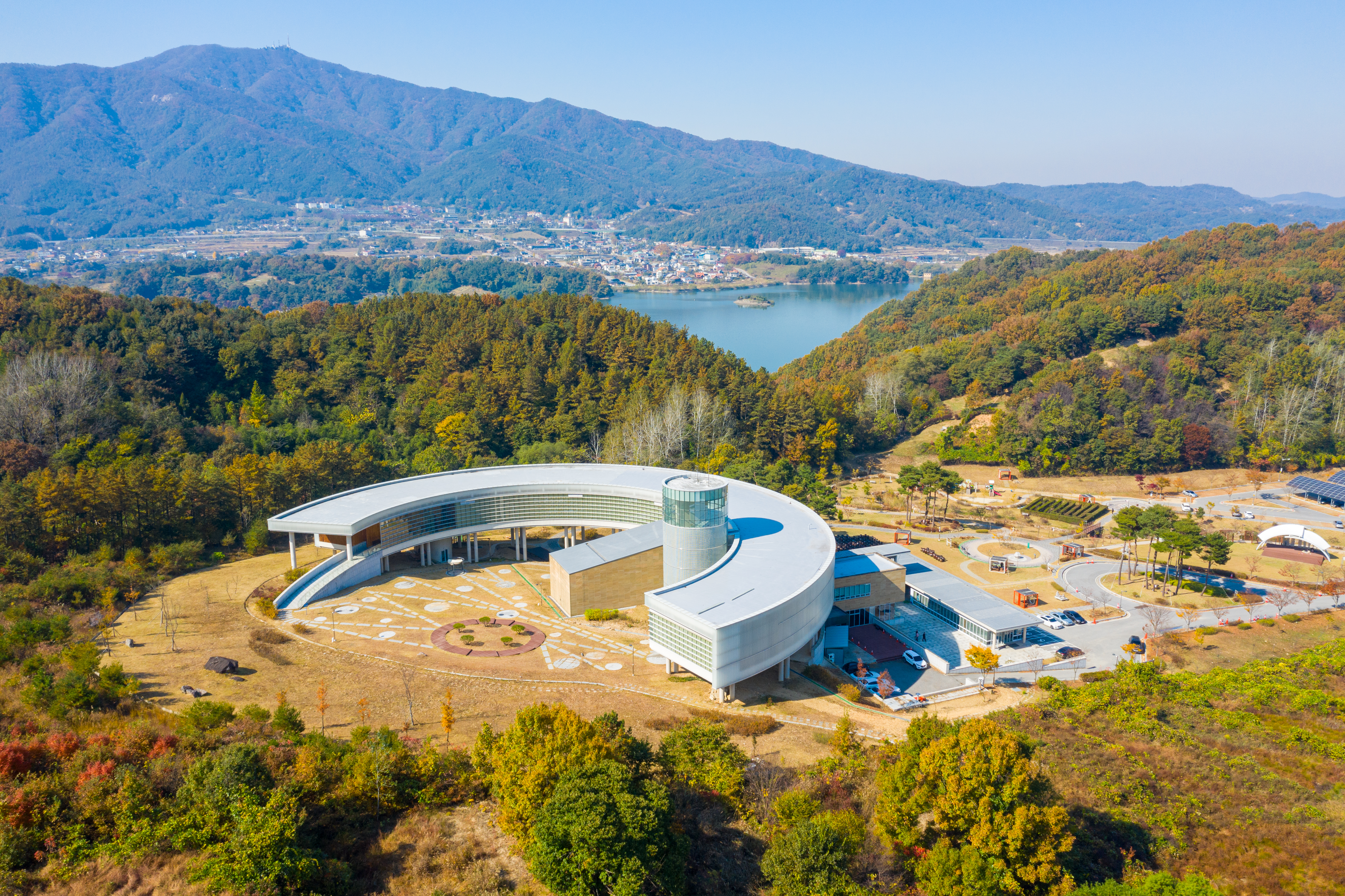
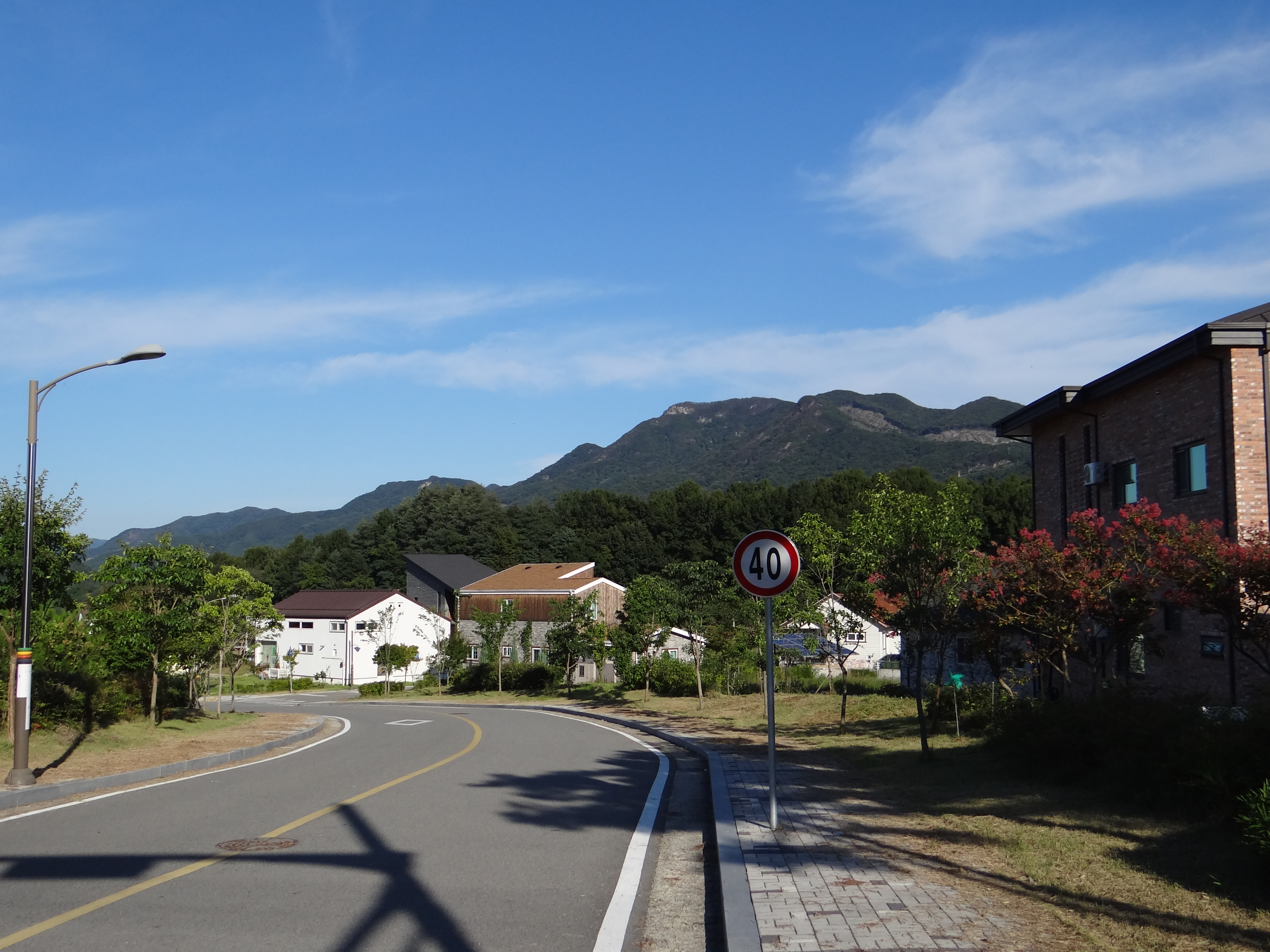
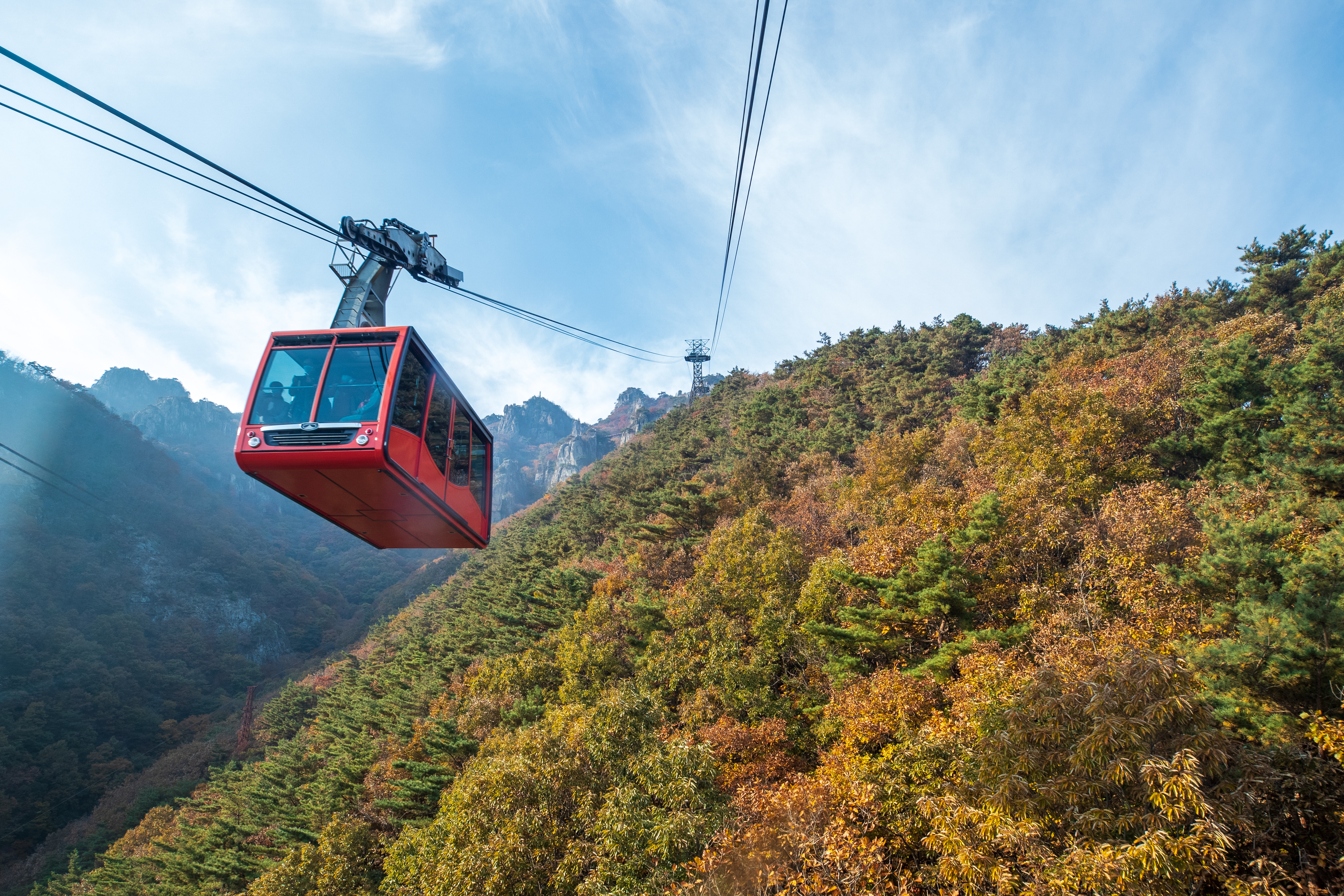
- From the top: The Korean Alcohol Theme Museum, road, Daedunsan

- Flag Emblem of Wanju

- Location in South Korea
- Coordinates: 35°53′29″N 127°15′14″E
- Country: South Korea
- State: Jeonbuk
- Administrative divisions: 3 eup, 10 myeon

Area
  - Total: 820.94 km^{2} (316.97 sq mi)

Population (September 2025)
  - Total: 100,229
  - Density: 111/km^{2} (290/sq mi)
  - Dialect: Jeolla
- Area code: +82-63-2xx

Korean name
- Hangul: 완주군
- Hanja: 完州郡
- RR: Wanju-gun
- MR: Wanju-gun

Wanju County (Korean: 완주군; lit. 'Perfect region') is a county in North Jeolla province, South Korea. It almost entirely surrounds the city of Jeonju.

== History ==
=== Ancient ===
In the Three Han period it was part of the Mahan confederacy, and in 555 (Wideok 2) Jeonju week was installed but in 565 Jeonju week was abolished. After the Baekje kingdom collapsed in 660 (Uija 20), the area was conquered by the kingdom of Silla and was incorporated into it in 685 (Sinmunwang 5). The city of Jeonju became one of nine chu, the provincial capitals of the kingdom. It was changed to Jeonju in 757 (Gyeongdeok 16). The Jeonju feeling was installed and was highly regarded as the center of the military. In 892 (Jinseong of Silla 6), Kyŏn Hwŏn established the Later Baekje kingdom in Wanju, and the area remained part of that country for 45 years until it collapsed in 936 (Taejo of Goryeo 19).

=== Goryeo ===
In 936, the 19th year of the reign of King Taejo of Goryeo, Jeonju was changed to Annamdaedoho-bu and in 940 (Taejo of Goryeo 23) it was restored back to Jeonju. In 993, Jeonju was changed to Seunghwa and put Jeoldoanmusa, and in 995, it was named Sunui-gun that belong to Gangnamdo when dividing the nation into 10 do 12 ju. In 1005 (Mokjong 8) Jeoldosa of Jeonju was dispatched, and in 1018 (Hyeonjong 9) was promoted to Annamdaedoho-bu during the nationwide district system reform, but in 1022 it was renamed back to Jeonju-mok. In 1355 (Gongmin 4) although Jung Ji-Sang which was an Allyeong-sa of Jeolla Province was degraded to Bugo by the incident when he imprisoned Yasabulhwa who was a Wonuisasin, the year after he was raised back to Jeonjubu.

=== Joseon ===
The Joseon dynasty was founded in the county in 1392 (the 1st year of Taejo of Joseon), and the county was promoted to Jeonjuyusu-bu due to its importance as Taejo's hometown. In 1403 (Taejo of Joseon 3) it was renamed Jeonju-bu and unchanged until the end of Joseon, but its territory was reduced compared to the Goryeo era.

=== Modern ===
In 1914 Gosan-gun was merged with Jeonju-gun, and in 1935 Jeonju-eup was promoted to Jeonju-bu. Jeonju-gun was renamed Wanju-gun and covered 15 myeon.

=== South Korea ===
In 1956 Samnye-myeon was promoted to an eup, and in 1957 Chopo and part of Ujeon-myeon and Jochon Yongjin were added to Jeonju. In 1983, part of Sanggwan-myeon was transferred to Jeonju. Part of Chopo-myeon was transferred to Samnye-up and Yongjin-myeon, and part of Ujeon-myeon was transferred to Gui-myeon. In 1966 the Gyeongcheon branch office was built in Unju-myeon, and in 1973 Bongdong-myeon was promoted to an eup, Iksan-gun Onsuri Volcano Village was transferred to Samnye-eup, and Samnye-ri and part of Sanjeong-ri of Yongjin-eup were transferred to Jeonju Ua-dong. In 1983, Sanggwan-myeon Daeseong-ri, Saekjang-ri and part Sanjeong-ri of Yongjin-myeon were transferred to Jeonju, and part of Dodeok-ri of Baekgu-myeon in Gimje-gun was transferred to Jochon-myeon. In 1985 Jochon-myeon was promoted to an eup, and transferred to Jeonju in 1987, and in 1989 the Gyeongcheon branch office of Unju-myeon was promoted to Gyeongcheon-myeon. In 1990, part of Iseo-myeon (Jung-ri and Sangnim-ri) was transferred to Jeonju. In 1994 part of Geumpyeong-ri of Yongji-myeon in Gimje-gun was transferred to Iseo-myeon.

== Gallery ==
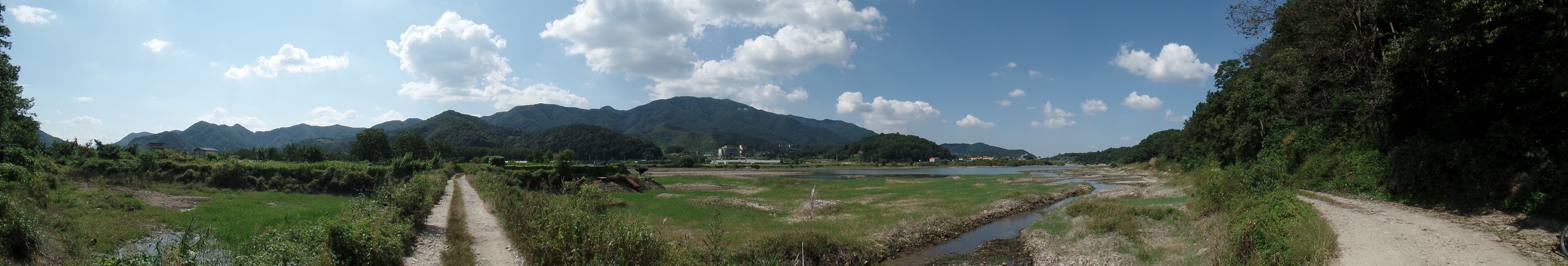
Wanju county (in Gui near Gui Lake outside Jeonju), September 2014
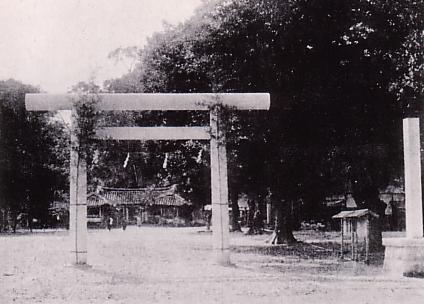
Shinto shrine in Jeonju during the Japanese occupation of Korea

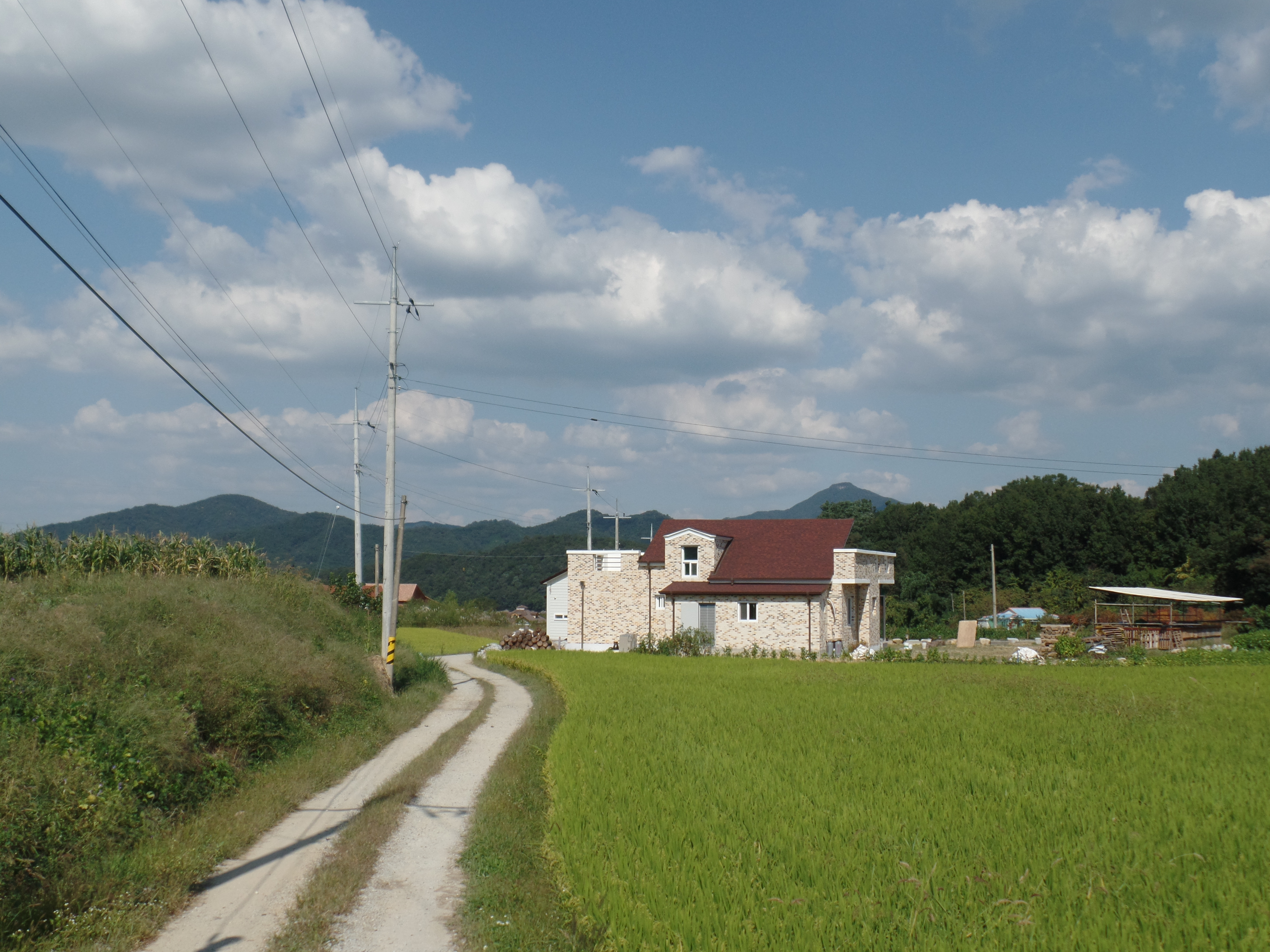
Wanju housing development near Gui Lake, September 2014

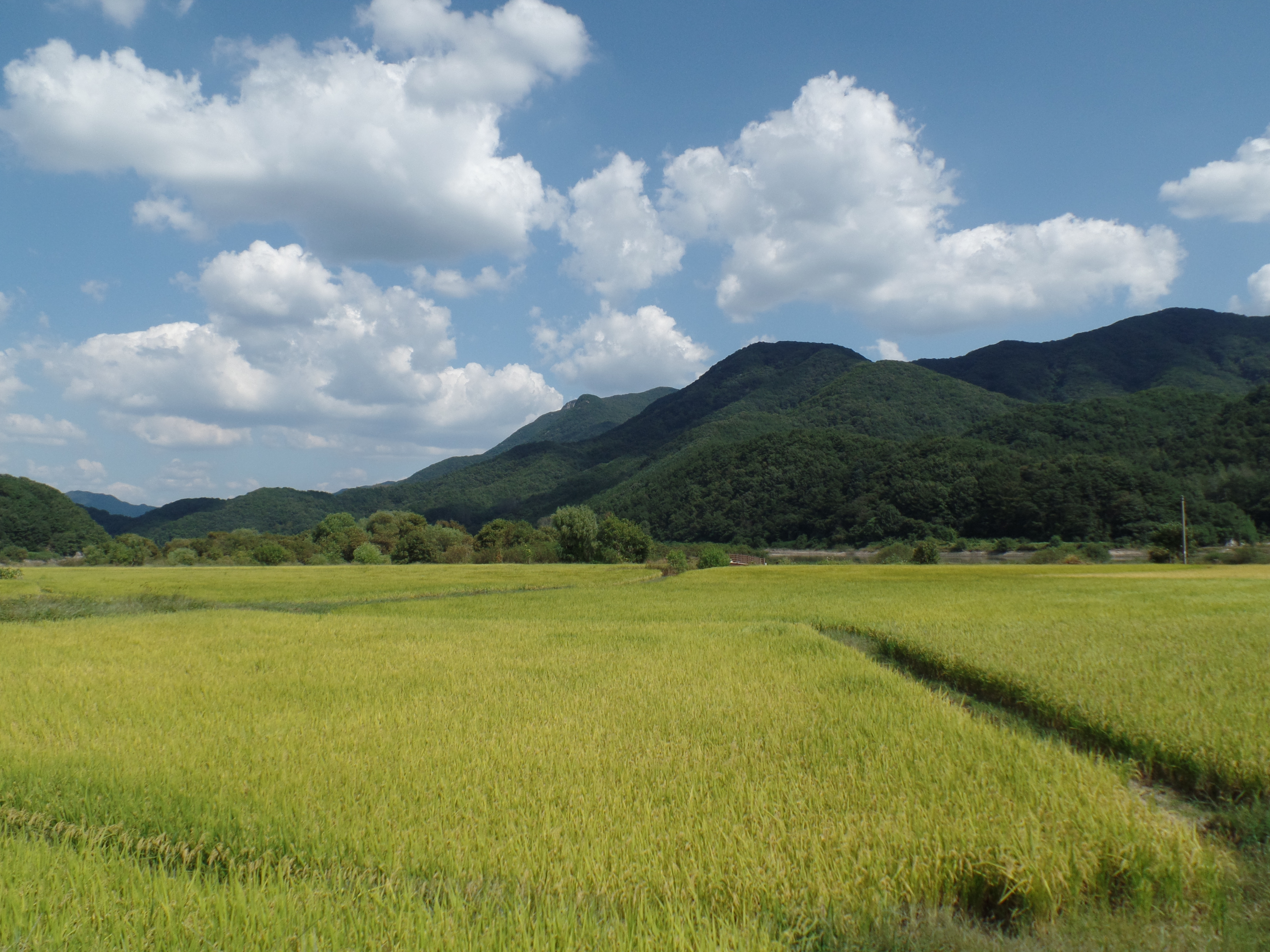
Autumn rice fields in Wanju near Gui Lake, September 2014

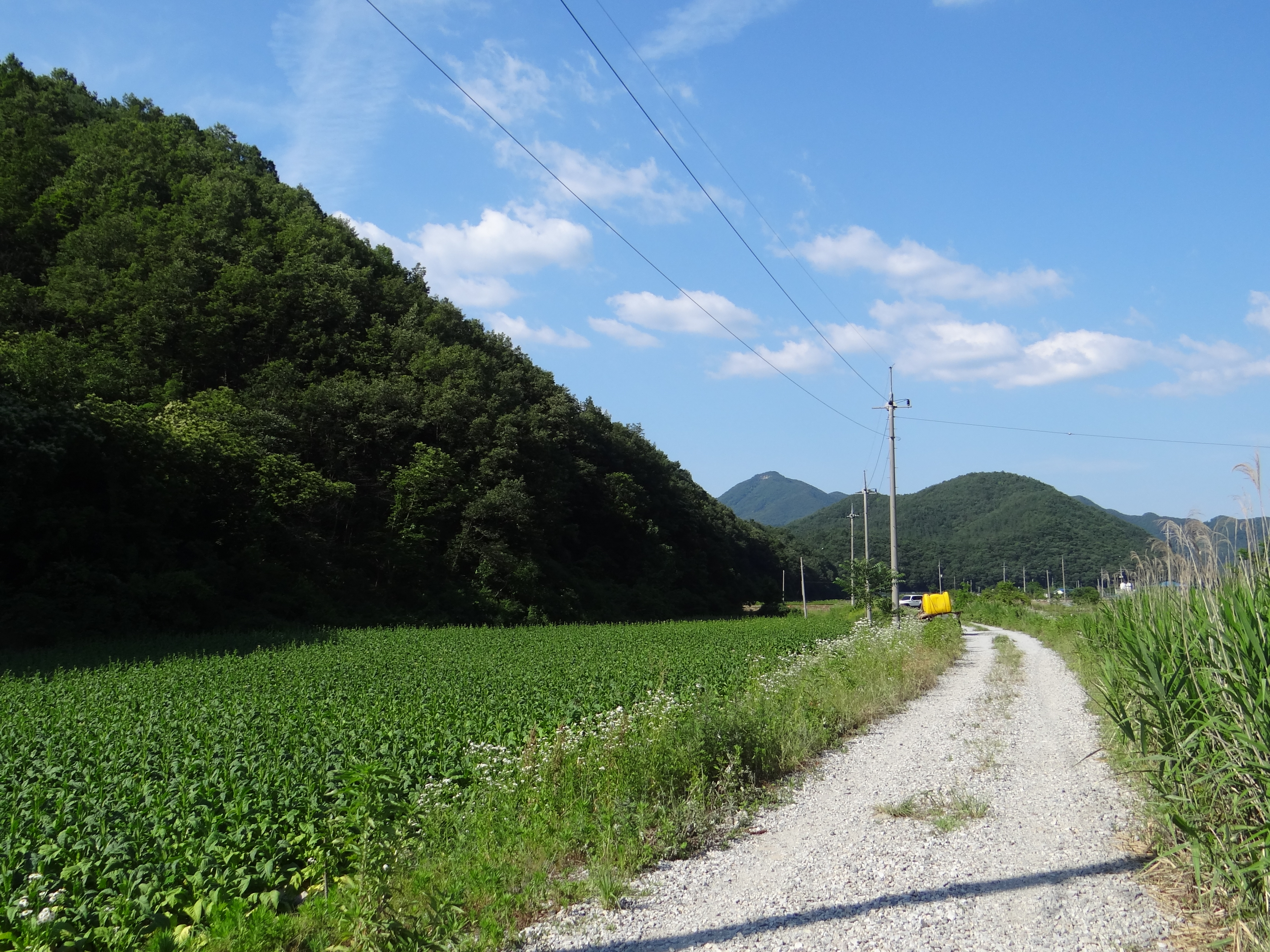
Wanju (Gui) in June 2016

== Tourism ==
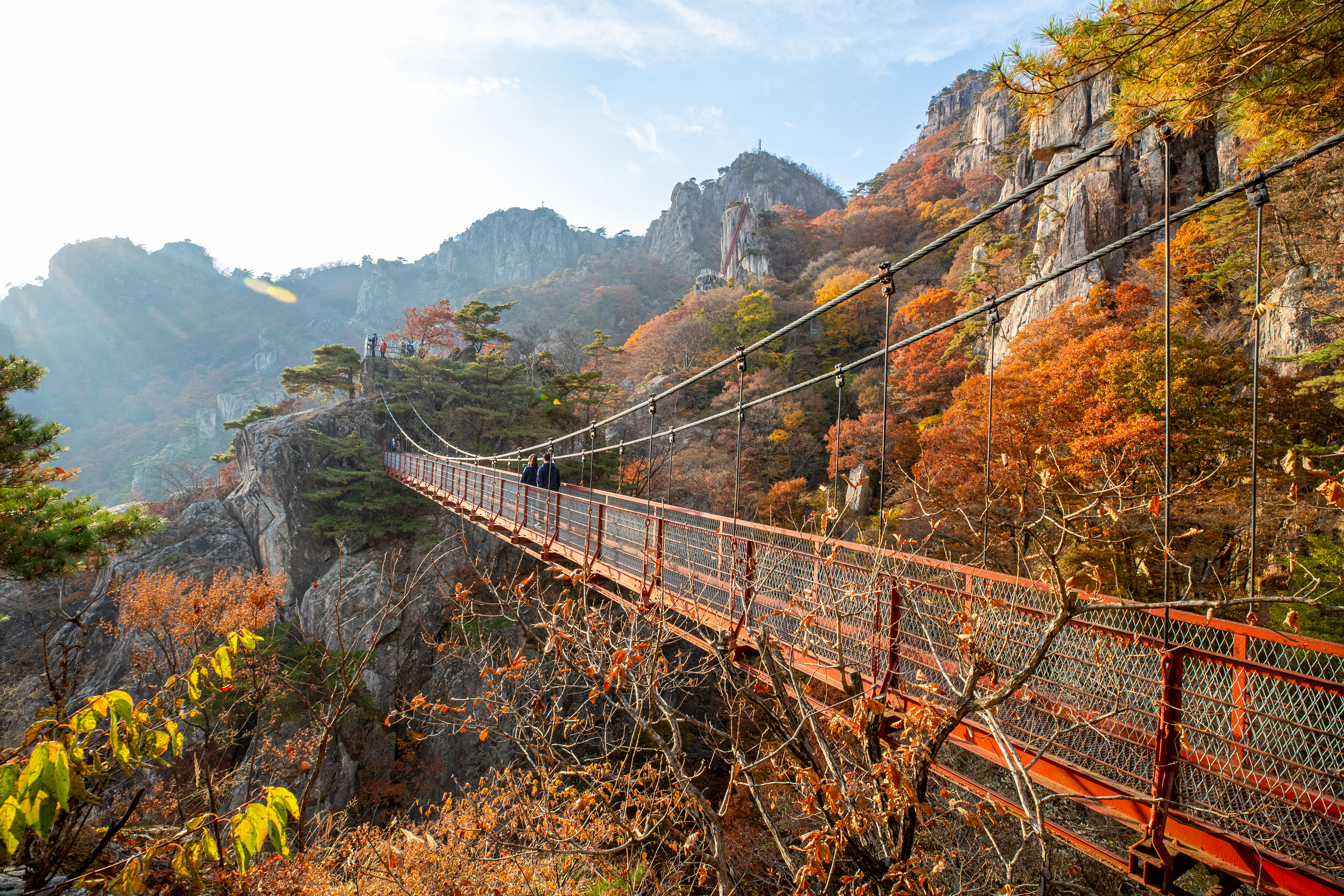
Daedunsan

- Daedunsan Cable Car is a cable car with a rail of about 1 km at an angle of about 20 degrees. The time required is about 5 minutes.

== Art Museum ==
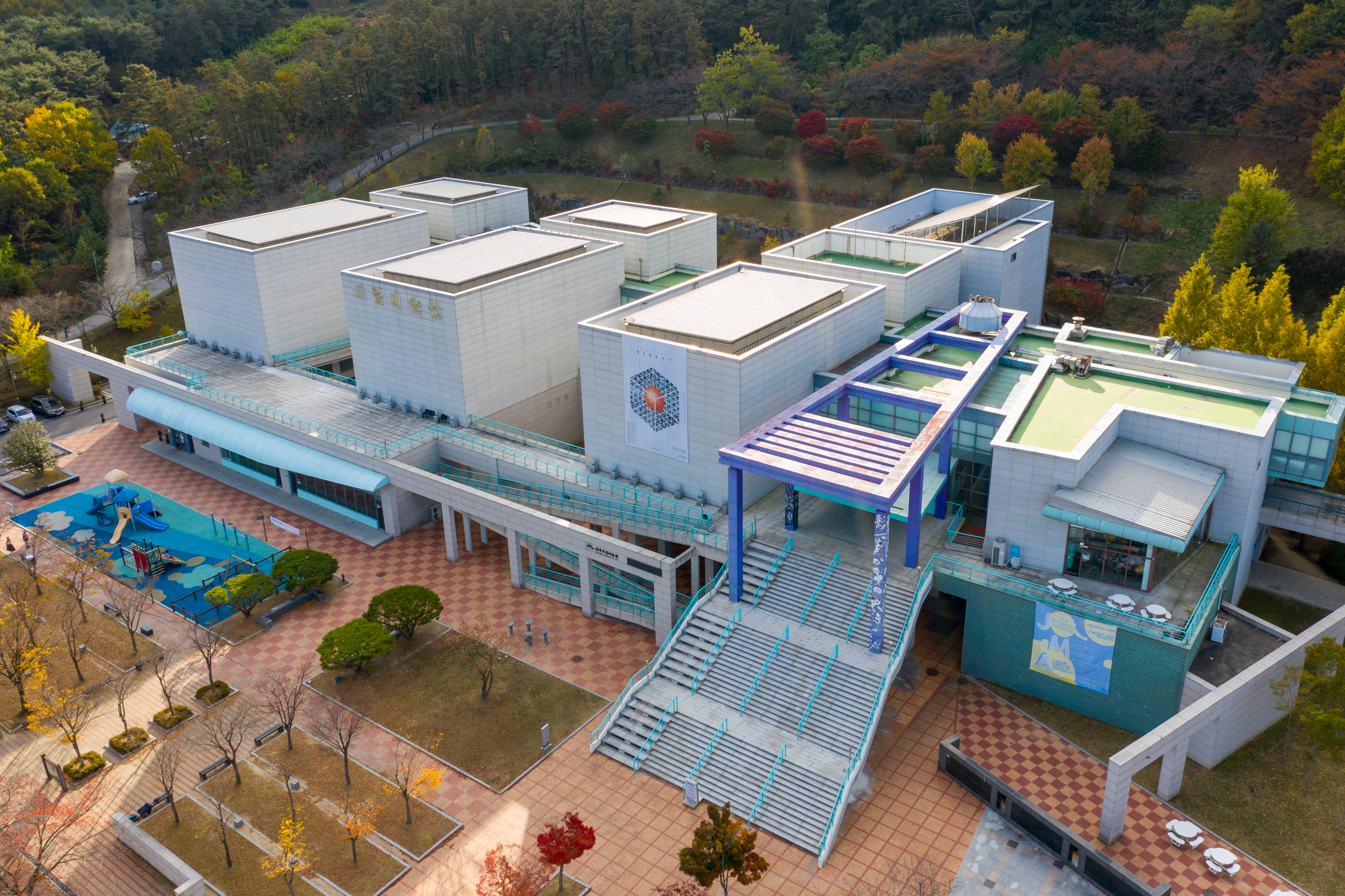
Jeonbuk Museum of Art

- Jeonbuk Museum of Art

Jeonbuk Museum of Art, a provincial art museum that opened in October 2004, is located in Imsil-eup.

== Festivals ==
=== Wild Food Festival ===
The Wild Food Festival (와일드푸드축제) is a festival which is focused around reconnecting with nature and eating local food. The festival happens every September or October in the Gosan Recreational Forest.

=== Samnye Strawberry Festival ===
Since Samnye strawberries are renowned nationwide for their high quality, the festival is crowded with people who come to sample them at the end of every March at the Youth Training Center in Samnye-eup. Promotional events including experiencing the strawberry harvest, making strawberry cake and strawberry injeolmi, and planting strawberries in flowerpots are held, and environmentally-friendly strawberries can be tasted and bought.

== Twin towns and sister cities ==
Wanju is twinned with:

- Seodaemun-gu, South Korea
- Seocho-gu, South Korea
- Chilgok, South Korea
- Gunpo, South Korea
- Huai'an, China
