= Jeonju Bibimbap Festival =

Annual South Korean food festival

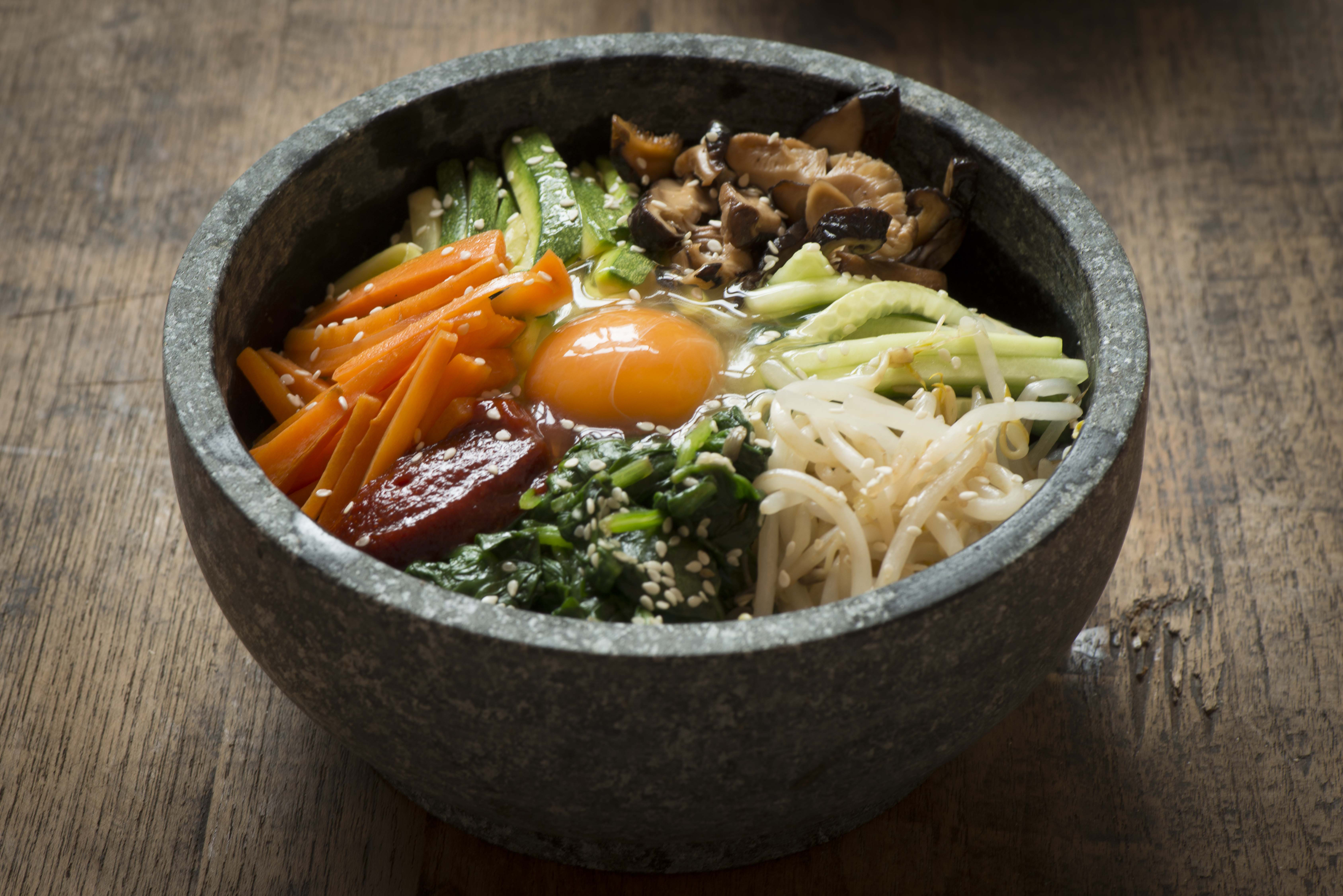
Dolsot bibimbap

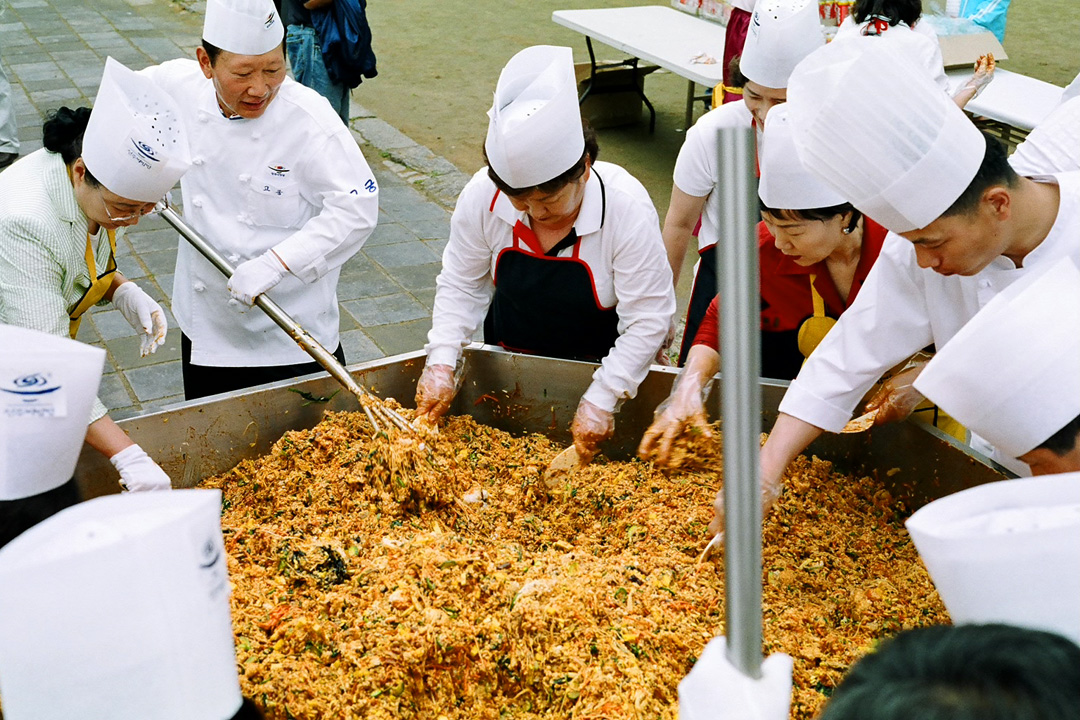
Jeonju Bibimbap Festival

The Jeonju Bibimbap Festival (Korean: 전주 비빔밥 축제) is an annual Korean food festival that takes place in the Jeonju Hanok Village in South Korea. It centers on a regional variety of the popular Korean dish bibimbap. The festival has been celebrated since 2007.

== Overview ==
The festival usually takes place during the month of October every year. It showcases the most iconic dish of the region, bibimbap, and a favorite among tourists. Visitors to the festival can participate in cooking competitions, sample local recipes, and learn how to cook traditional bibimbap. They can also participate in folk games, enjoy concerts, and visit a night market.

The festival has been reported to draw 150,000 citizens and tourists. It was cancelled in 2020 due to the COVID-19 pandemic. However, in 2021, the festival was held over four-weeks under the title "World Bibim Week" ("월드 비빔위크").

In 2022, the festival was held offline from the 6th to the 10th of October.

== See also ==
- Food festivals in South Korea
