= Boseoksa =

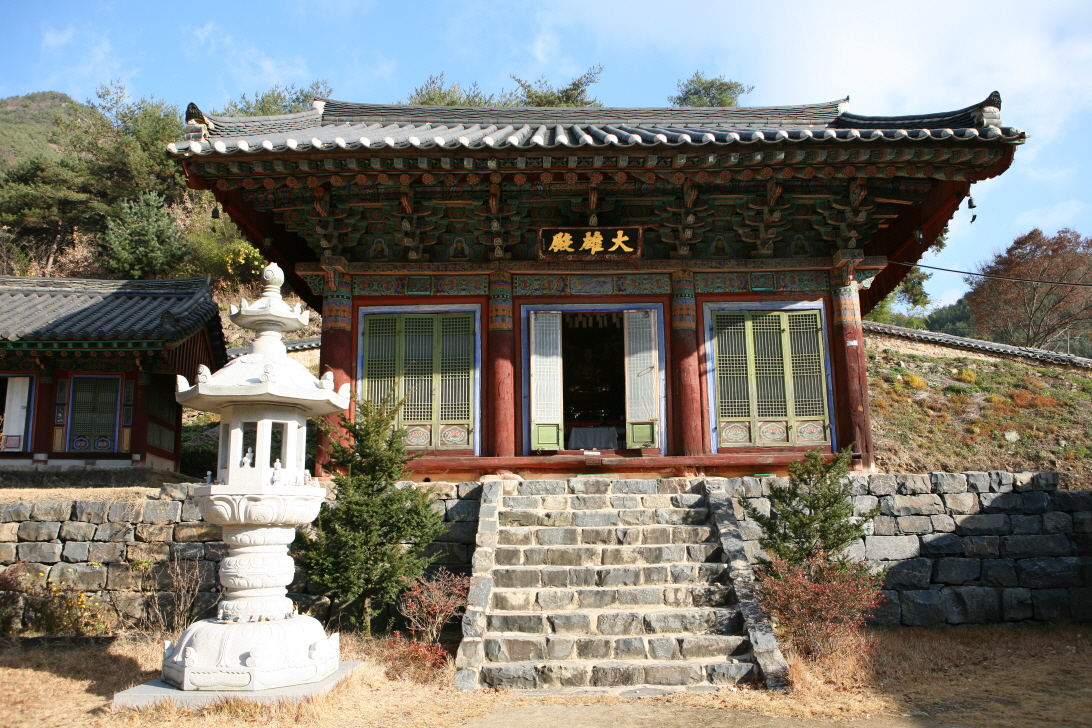

- Location within South Korea

Religion
- Affiliation: Buddhism

Location
- Country: South Korea
- Coordinates: 36.0543°N 127.4759°E

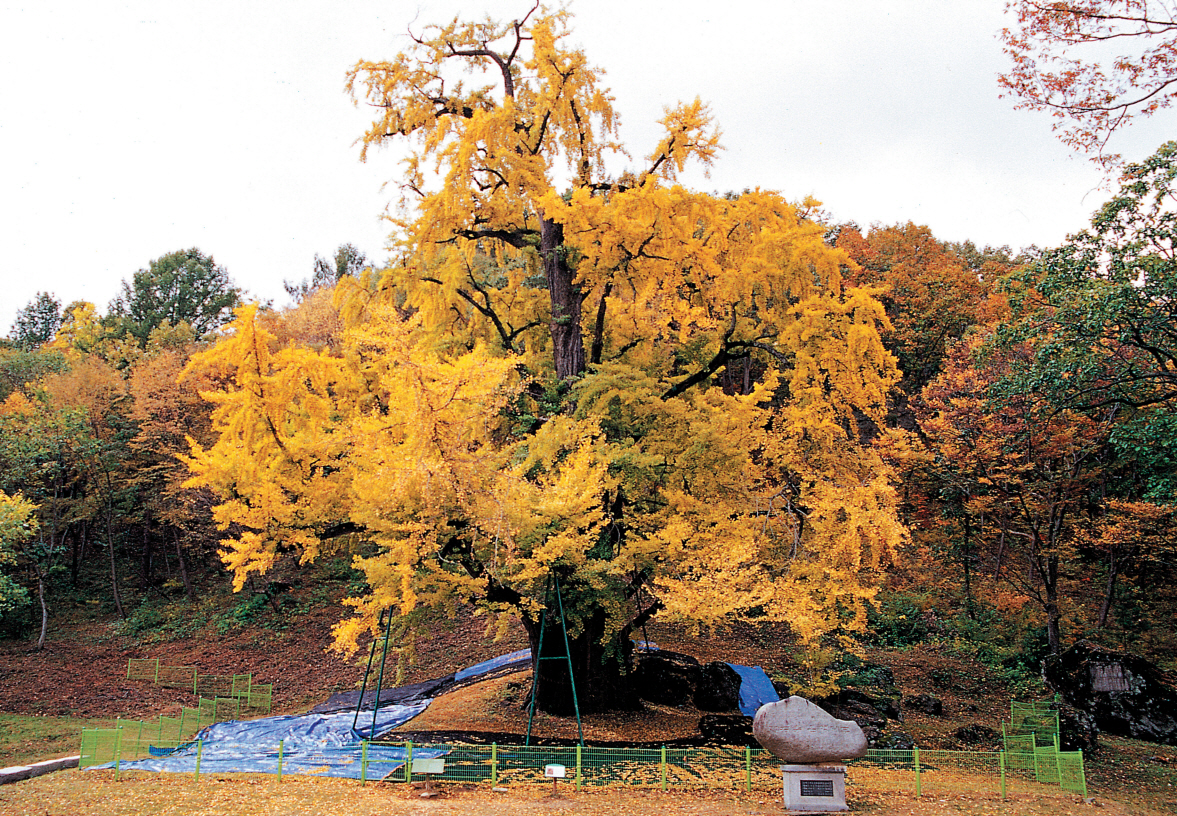
Ginkgo Tree of Boseoksa Temple, Geumsan

Boseoksa (보석사, 寶石寺) is a Korean Buddhist temple located Seokdong-ri, Nam-myeon, Geumsan-gun, Chungcheongnam-do. It was founded in 885 during the 11th year of King Heongang. During the Japanese colonial period, this temple was designated as one of the 31 head temples. The resulting pyramidal hierarchy was supposed to take control over the Korean Buddhism.

== Bibliography ==
- EncyKor "보석사 (寶石寺)" [Boseoksa]. Encyclopedia of Korean National Culture.
- Park Jeongeun (June 2016). Clerical Marriage and Buddhist Modernity in Early Twentieth-century Korea (PhD, Asian Studies). University of British Columbia (Vancouver).
