= Daegu Chimac Festival =

Food festival in Daegu, South Korea

The Daegu Chimac Festival (Korean: 대구 치맥 페스티벌) is a yearly food festival in South Korea, hosted at Duryu Park in every July in Daegu, South Korea. "Chimac" refers to chimaek, meaning "chicken and beer".

The event draws a significant crowd each year and hosts many special events and music shows.

== Show dates ==
- The 2013 show was held 18–21 July.
- The 2014 show was held 17–20 July.
- The 2015 show was held 22–26 July.
- The 2016 show was held 27–31 July.
