= Geumsan County =

County in South Chungcheong Province, South Korea

Coordinates: 36°06′11″N 127°29′20″E

Geumsan
- County
- Panoramic view of Geumsan-eup

- Flag

- Location in South Korea
- Country: South Korea
- Region: Hoseo; Honam (before 1963)
- Administrative divisions: 1 eup, 9 myeon

Area
  - Total: 575.98 km^{2} (222.39 sq mi)

Population (September 2024)
  - Total: 50,477
  - Density: 88/km^{2} (230/sq mi)
  - Dialect: Chungcheong Jeolla

Korean name
- Hangul: 금산군
- Hanja: 錦山郡
- RR: Geumsan-gun
- MR: Kŭmsan-gun

Geumsan County (Korean: 금산군) is a county in South Chungcheong Province, South Korea. Before 1963, it was part of North Jeolla Province. It borders Muju County, which is famous for its ski resort nearby.

== History ==
Administrative district name, Geumsan-gun, have nowadays was originated from the union of old Geumsan-gun and Jinsan-gun on March 1, 1914. The old Geumsan-gun was in Baekje Age called Jinnae-gun or Jinnaeeul-gun, and after Silla unified Three Kingdoms of Korea, its name was changed to Jinye-gun during the reign of King Gyeongdeok. In 1305 (Goryeo King Chungnyeol 31st year) it was promoted to Geumju-gun, including 5 hyeons, Buri-hyeon, Cheonggeo-hyeon, Mupung-hyeon, Jindong-hyeon, with Geumju governor to govern it. (Goryeosa 57th volume) In 1413 (Joseon Dynasty Taejong 13th year), (Geumju-gun) had its name changed to Geumsan-gun until the end of Joseon Age.

The old Jinsan-gun was in Baekjae Age called Jindong-hyeon. When Silla unified 3 nations, it became a subject hyeon of Hwangsan-gun.

It was changed to Okgyeo-bu in early Goryeo Age, and then became a part of Geumju-gun in 1305 (Goryeo King Chungnyeol 31st year).

In 1390, it had become a subject hyeon of Gosan-hyeon. During the Joseon dynasty, in 1393 (Taejo 2nd year), after burying the umbilical cord of Taejo in Maninsan Mountain, it was promoted to Jinju-gun and was governed by Jinju governor. In 1413 (Joseon Taejong 13th year) its name was again changed to Jinsan-gun. On August 4, 1896, as 13 dos were executed according to Royal Order 36th, Geumsan-gun and Jinsan-gun, which were a part of Gongju-bu, South Chungcheong Province, were incorporated into North Jeolla Province. As mentioned above, on March 1, 1914(under Zenrahoku-dō), Jinsan-gun was united into the current Geumsan-gun. It first consisted of 10 myeons: Geumsanmyeon, Geumseong-myeon, Jewon-myeon, Buri-myeon, Gunbuk-myeon, Namil-myeon, Nami-myeon, Jinsan-myeon, Boksu-myeon, and Chubu-myeon. However, on November 1, 1940, according to Ordinance 221st, Geumsan-myeon was promoted to Geumsan-eub, thus making one eub and nine myeons.

Later on January 1 of 1963, following the administrative district reorganization according to the law about the change of district boundaries (Law 1172nd) of Seoul-si, do, gun, gu, Geumsan-gun was incorporated into Chungcheongnam-do from Jeollabuk-do.

Geumsan-gun is famous for ginseng since late Goryeo Dynasty and nowaday it also has one of the biggest market of ginseng and medicinal herbs in Korea. Even though it doesn't produce as much ginseng as it did in the old days, it still produces more than 80% of ginseng distributed across South Korea.

== Climate ==
Geumsan has a humid continental climate (Köppen: Dwa), but can be considered a borderline humid subtropical climate (Köppen: Cwa) using the −3 °C (27 °F) isotherm.

Climate data for Geumsan (1991–2020 normals, extremes 1972–present)
Month	Jan	Feb	Mar	Apr	May	Jun	Jul	Aug	Sep	Oct	Nov	Dec	Year
Record high °C (°F)	17.5 (63.5)	22.1 (71.8)	27.1 (80.8)	31.5 (88.7)	35.0 (95.0)	34.8 (94.6)	37.5 (99.5)	38.8 (101.8)	36.5 (97.7)	31.1 (88.0)	26.4 (79.5)	18.6 (65.5)	38.8 (101.8)
Mean daily maximum °C (°F)	4.0 (39.2)	6.8 (44.2)	12.5 (54.5)	19.3 (66.7)	24.4 (75.9)	27.8 (82.0)	29.8 (85.6)	30.3 (86.5)	26.2 (79.2)	20.8 (69.4)	13.6 (56.5)	6.2 (43.2)	18.5 (65.3)
Daily mean °C (°F)	−2.4 (27.7)	0.0 (32.0)	5.2 (41.4)	11.6 (52.9)	17.1 (62.8)	21.6 (70.9)	24.8 (76.6)	24.9 (76.8)	19.7 (67.5)	12.8 (55.0)	6.1 (43.0)	−0.4 (31.3)	11.8 (53.2)
Mean daily minimum °C (°F)	−7.9 (17.8)	−6.0 (21.2)	−1.5 (29.3)	4.0 (39.2)	10.1 (50.2)	16.1 (61.0)	20.8 (69.4)	20.9 (69.6)	14.8 (58.6)	6.9 (44.4)	0.2 (32.4)	−5.8 (21.6)	6.1 (43.0)
Record low °C (°F)	−22.2 (−8.0)	−20.7 (−5.3)	−13.1 (8.4)	−6.9 (19.6)	0.0 (32.0)	5.8 (42.4)	10.9 (51.6)	9.9 (49.8)	3.6 (38.5)	−5.1 (22.8)	−10.9 (12.4)	−19.7 (−3.5)	−22.2 (−8.0)
Average precipitation mm (inches)	25.5 (1.00)	37.9 (1.49)	52.3 (2.06)	84.7 (3.33)	81.6 (3.21)	161.8 (6.37)	297.8 (11.72)	284.3 (11.19)	130.5 (5.14)	55.7 (2.19)	47.2 (1.86)	29.3 (1.15)	1,288.6 (50.73)
Average precipitation days (≥ 0.1 mm)	7.2	6.3	8.3	8.5	8.2	9.4	15.6	14.7	9.3	6.4	8.0	8.1	110
Average snowy days	7.6	5.2	2.6	0.1	0.0	0.0	0.0	0.0	0.0	0.1	1.8	6.0	22.8
Average relative humidity (%)	69.8	64.7	61.1	58.8	62.8	68.7	75.9	75.7	74.8	73.4	71.6	71.6	69.1
Mean monthly sunshine hours	166.9	177.6	212.2	222.0	242.8	197.8	159.6	169.9	168.7	183.7	155.7	157.9	2,214.8
Percentage possible sunshine	54.4	57.8	56.8	58.8	56.4	48.6	40.3	45.6	49.4	55.9	51.5	52.2	52.1
Source: Korea Meteorological Administration (snow and percent sunshine 1981–2010)

== Tourism ==
There is Daedunsan Provincial Park. Seodae Mountain (904 metres above sea level), the highest mountain in Chungcheongnam-do, is also located here. There is also the Chilbak Gun, a tomb of 700 soldiers, including Cho Heon, a medical officer, and Yeongyu, a captain, who were martyred during the Imjin War (Battle of Geumsan). If you like fishing, you can kill two birds with one stone by fishing for bass in the Hwalim Forest and preserving the ecosystem.

Famous temples include Taegosa Temple and Jewellery Temple, which were built during the Silla Dynasty.

The World Insam Festival is held from September to October every year.

- Boseoksa
Boseoksa

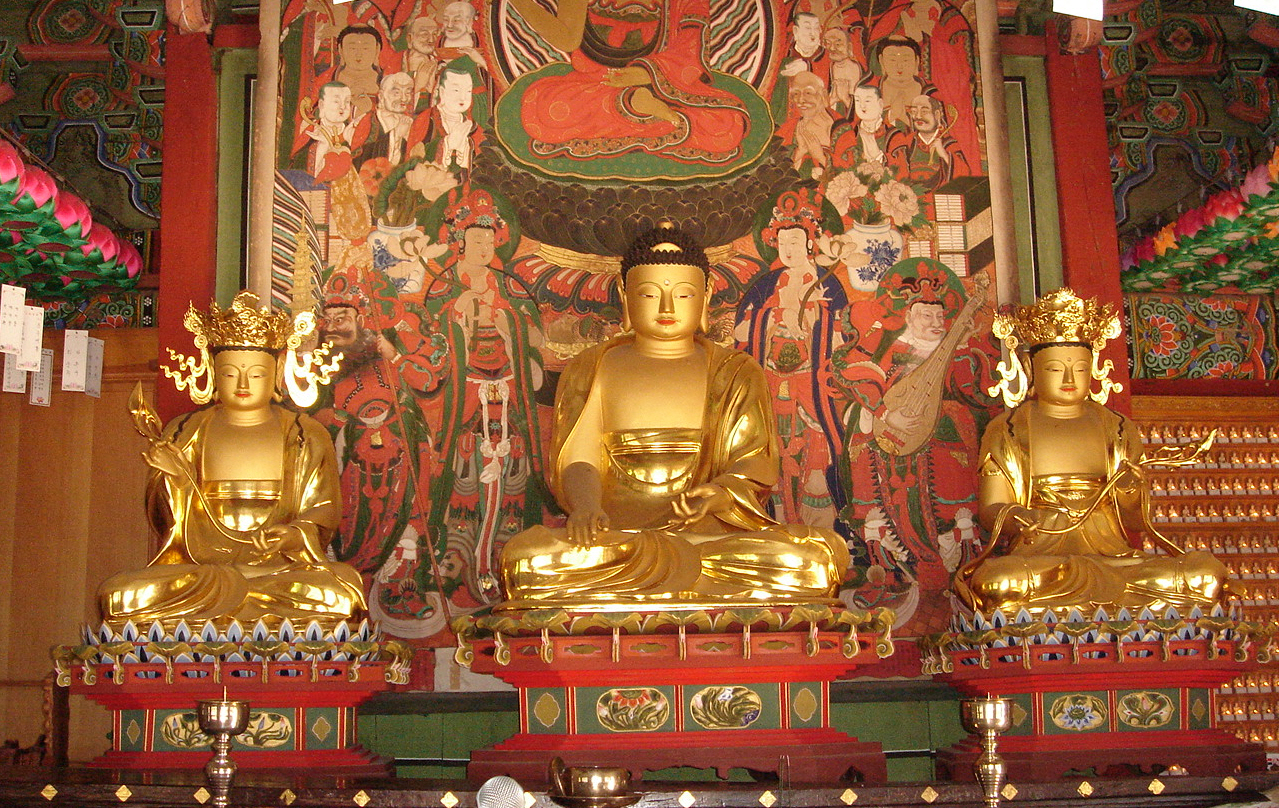

== Economy ==
Geumsam is home to one of Hankook's production facilities. It is said to be the largest tyre production plant in the world.

Geumsan's most famous product is Insam. Geumsan-eup is home to the largest Insam market in the country, and at its peak, 70 to 80 per cent of the nation's Insam was traded in Geumsan, and even now, Insam harvested in neighbouring areas such as Muju, Jinan, Yeongdong, and Daejeon is also widely distributed in Geumsan.
