= Daedunsan =

Mountain in South Korea

Coordinates: 36°07′12″N 127°19′24″E

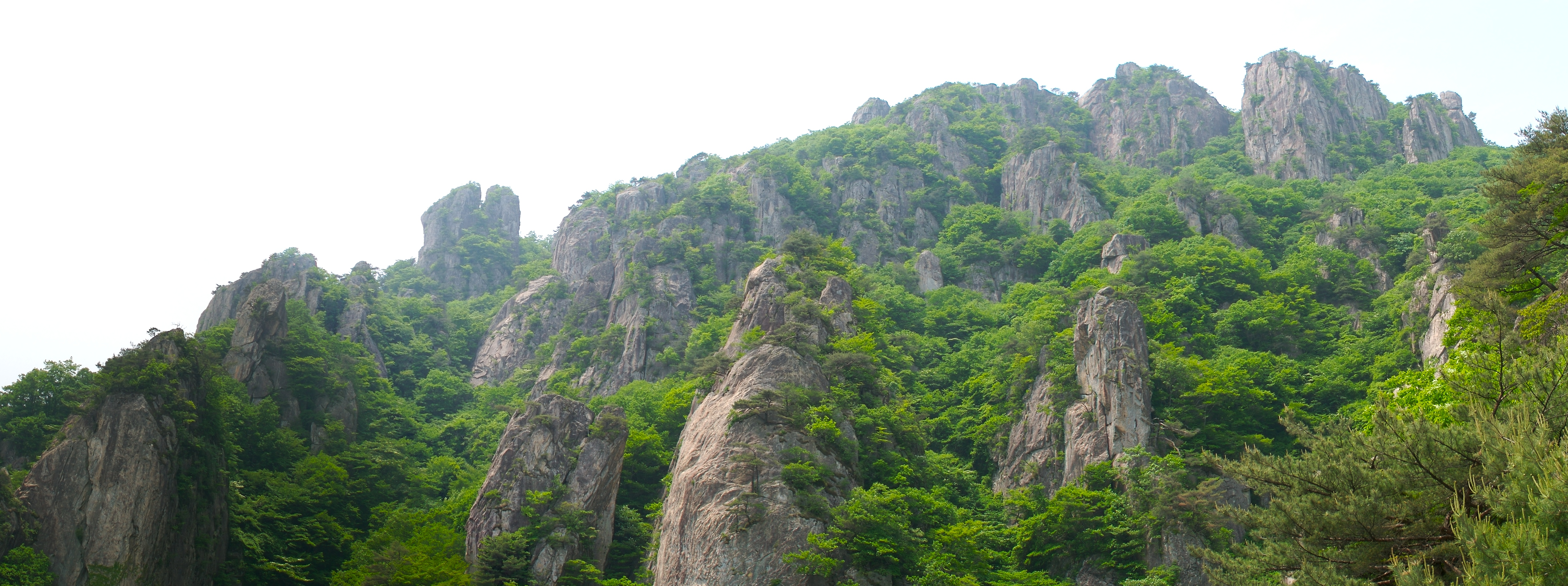

Highest point
- Elevation: 878 m (2,881 ft)

Geography
- Location: South Chungcheong Province, South Korea

Daedunsan (Korean: 대둔산) is a mountain of South Chungcheong Province, western South Korea. It has an elevation of 878 metres. Daedunsan has a thousand stone rods extending for 6 km. Daedun Mountain belongs to the "Old Mountain Range". The vegetation is generally 600m in height, with pine trees, oak trees, Korean plum-yew trees and so on. Above that, deciduous broad-leaved trees are dense.

== Gallery ==
Daedunsan

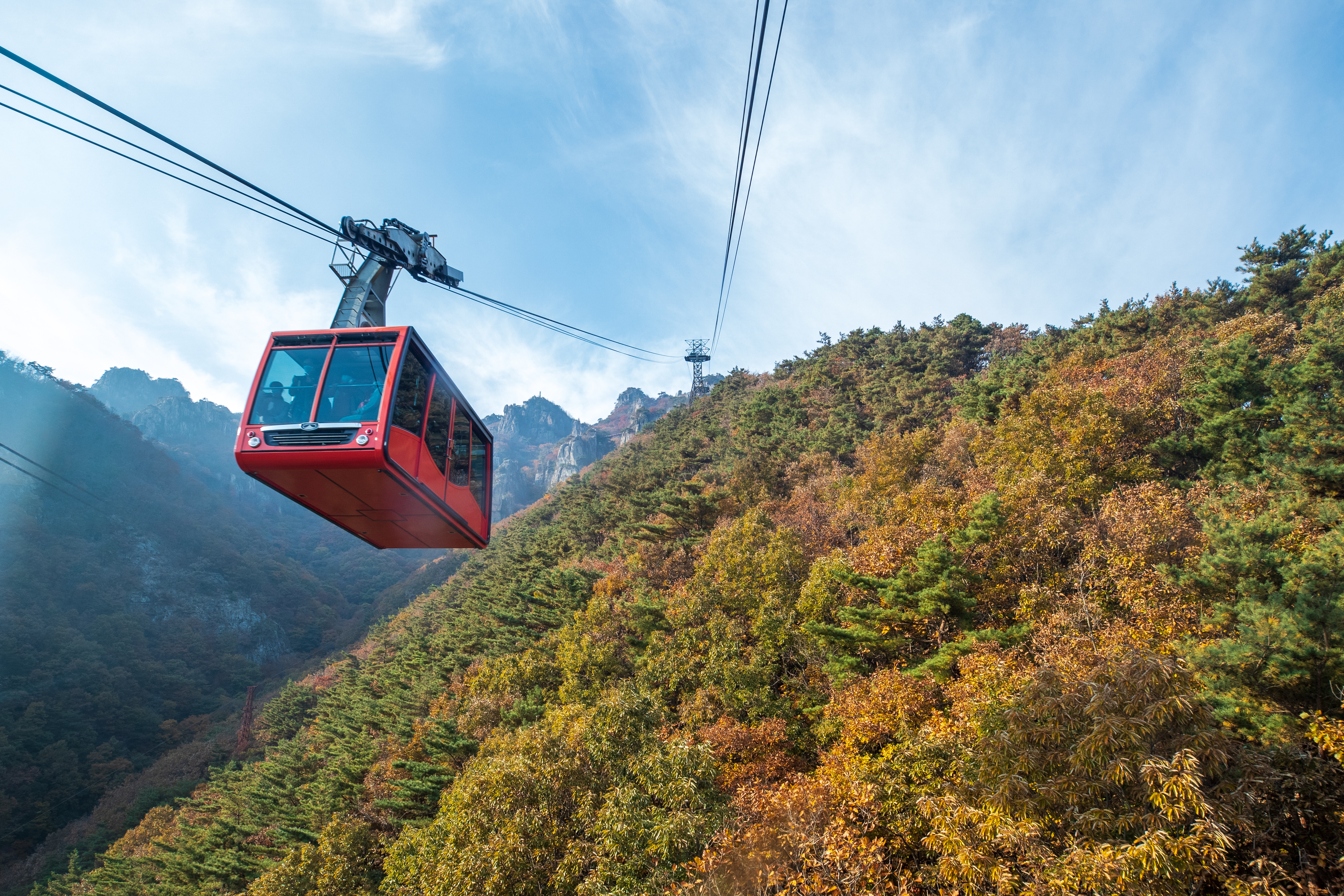

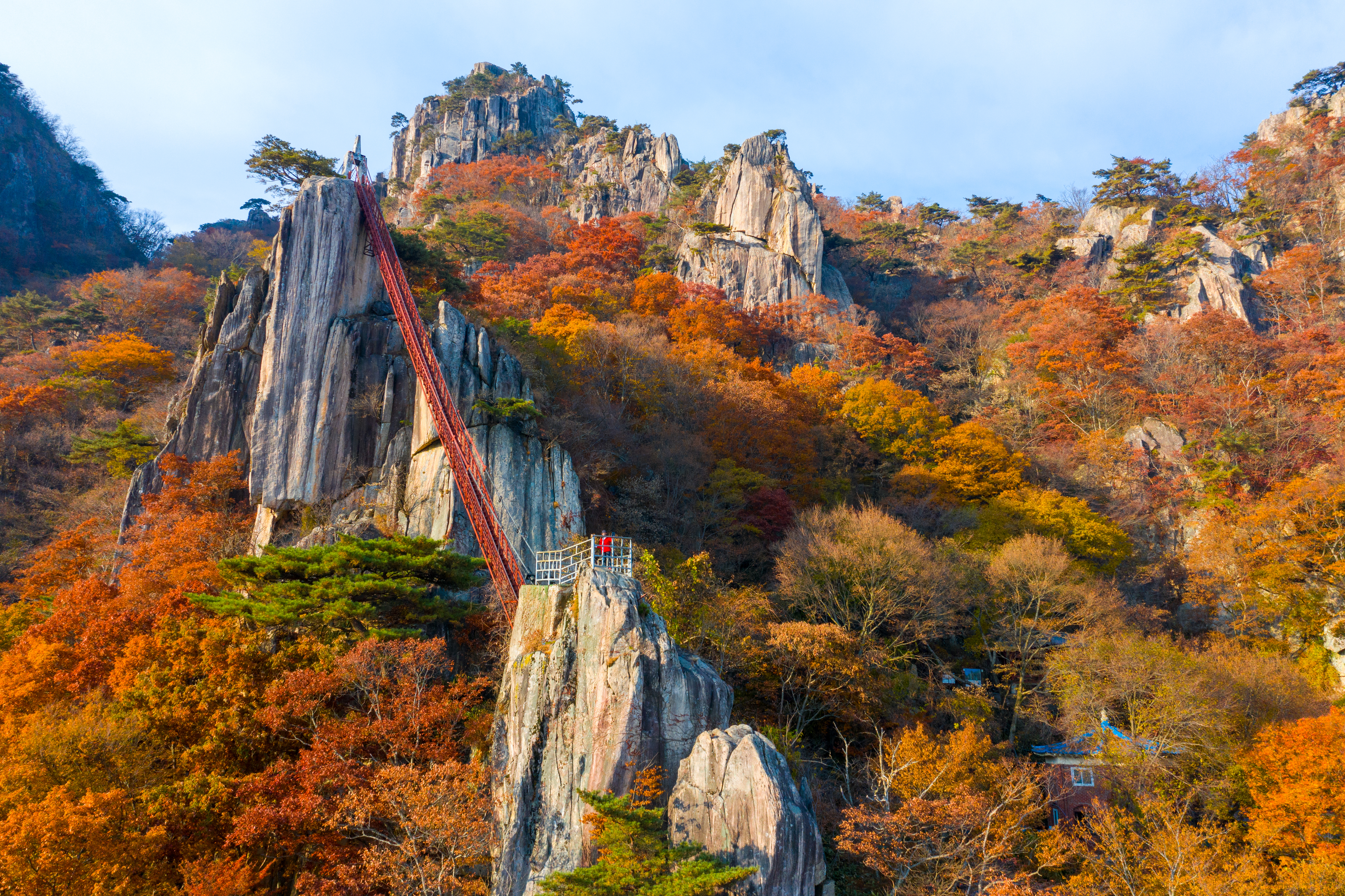

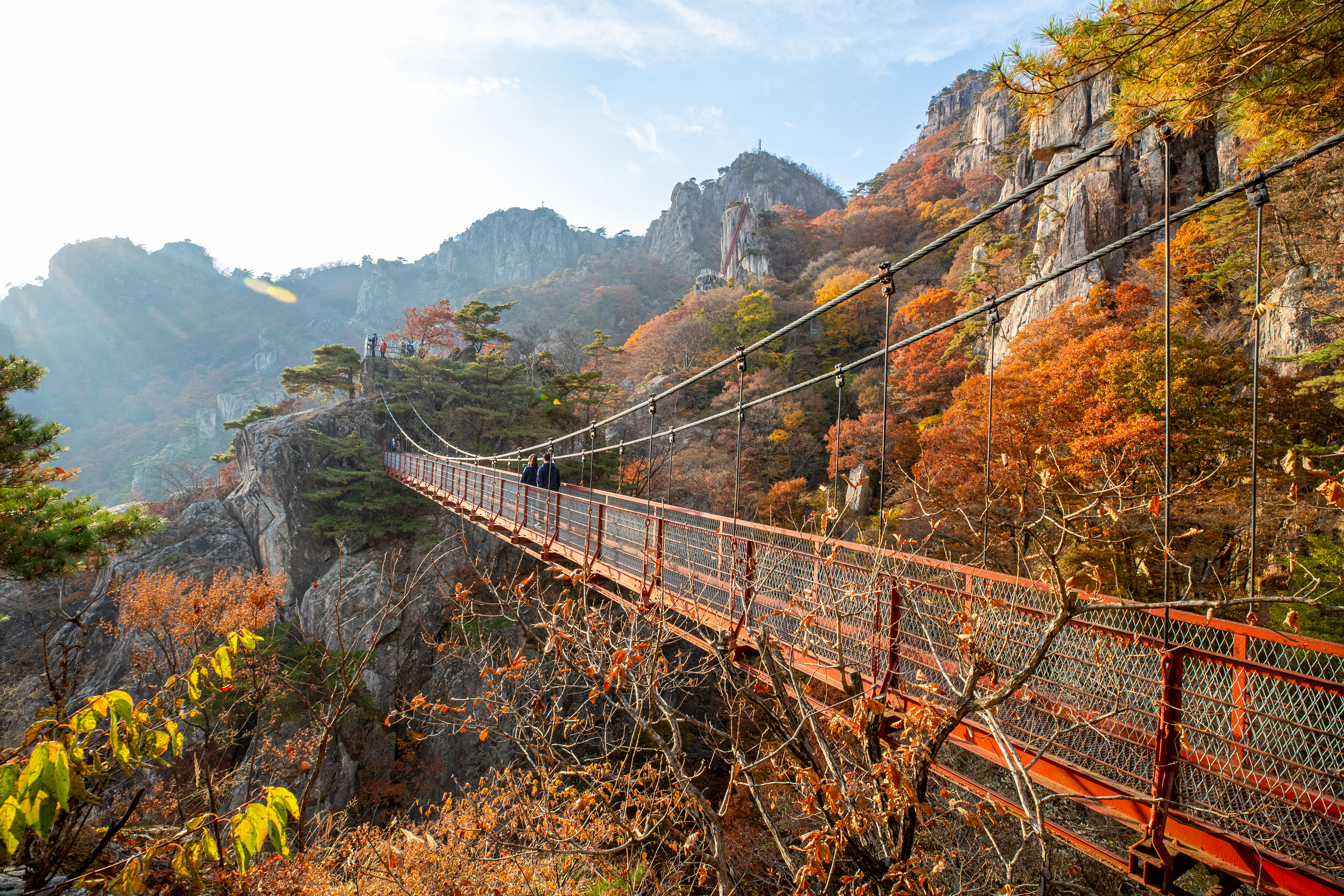

== See also ==
- List of mountains of Korea
