= Arif Ahmed (philosopher) =

Philosopher at Cambridge University

Arif Ahmed MBE
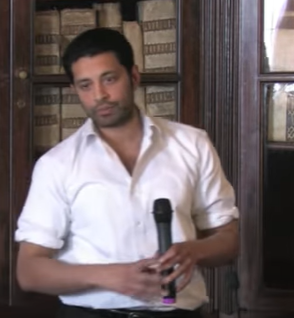
- Ahmed in 2013
- Born: Arif Mohuiddin Ahmed; 18 March 1974 (age 52)

Academic background
- Education: St Anne's College, Oxford; University of Sussex; Sidney Sussex College, Cambridge

Academic work
- Discipline: Philosopher
- Sub-discipline: Decision theory; philosophy of religion; Ludwig Wittgenstein

Arif Mohuiddin Ahmed (born 18 March 1974) is a British philosopher and academic, who is the Director for Freedom of Speech and Academic Freedom of the Office for Students, following his appointment in June 2023. Before this, Ahmed was a philosopher at the University of Cambridge.

== Biography ==
Ahmed was born on 18 March 1974 in Taunton, Somerset, England. He was educated at Bishop's Hull Primary School and Queen's College, an independent school in Taunton. He studied mathematics at St Anne's College, Oxford, graduating with a Bachelor of Arts (BA) in 1995. He then changed direction and studied for a Master of Arts (MA) in philosophy at the University of Sussex, graduating in 1996. Next, he undertook a Doctor of Philosophy (PhD) degree in philosophy at Sidney Sussex College, Cambridge, which he completed in 2001.

In 2000, he joined Girton College, Cambridge, as a college teaching officer. He was elected a fellow of Girton in 2004. He became a fellow of Gonville and Caius College, Cambridge in 2015. The University of Cambridge promoted him to reader in philosophy in 2016. He was made Nicholas Sallnow-Smith College Lecturer by his college in 2019. The university appointed him Professor of Philosophy in 2022. His research interests include decision theory and the philosophy of religion, from an atheist and libertarian point of view.

At Cambridge he was an advocate for the protection of freedom of speech. Ahmed was part of a network of academics associated with Peter Thiel and the online magazine Quillette, originating around 2017 and centred around the university's Faculty of Divinity. One of the group's first initiatives was to invite Canadian psychologist and social media influencer Jordan Peterson for a visiting fellowship at the university. The university administration intervened to rescind Peterson's invitation, although Peterson eventually did visit Cambridge, which Ahmed hailed as an "important victory." In 2020, Ahmed also led opposition to the University's proposed amendments to its freedom of speech policy, ultimately concluding with the rejection of the amendments. He was appointed Member of the Order of the British Empire (MBE) in the 2021 Birthday Honours for services to education.

In late 2022 the Minister for Women and Equalities, and Trade Secretary, Kemi Badenoch MP, appointed Ahmed as new commissioner to the Equality and Human Rights Commission (EHRC) Board. He took up the post on 1 January 2023 for a four-year term. He left the EHRC after being appointed Director for Freedom of Speech and Academic Freedom at the Office for Students (OfS) in June 2023.

== Books ==
Ahmed is the author of the books Saul Kripke (Continuum Books, 2007), which analyses the philosophy of Saul Kripke, and Evidence, Decision and Causality (Cambridge University Press, 2014), which defends evidential decision theory and critiques causal decision theory. Ahmed is also the editor of both Wittgenstein's Philosophical investigations: A critical guide (Cambridge University Press, 2010) and Newcomb's Problem (Cambridge University Press, 2018).

== Personal life ==
Ahmed's parents migrated from India to the United Kingdom in the 1970s. His father worked as a psychiatrist and his mother as a nurse. He became an atheist as a teenager, having been raised a Muslim. He has been described as a "New Atheist".

Ahmed's partner is Frisbee Sheffield, a classicist specialising in ancient philosophy. Together they have three children.
