= Homo narrans =

Binomial name for humans

Homo narrans ('storytelling human') is one of a number of binomial names for the human species modelled on the commonly used term Homo sapiens ('wise human'). The term posits the primacy of storytelling over, for example, language or reasoning, in differentiating Homo sapiens from other species of the genus Homo.

== History ==
Scholarly use of the term may originate with the German ethnologist Kurt Ranke in a paper published in 1967.

Another prominent coining of the term, apparently independent of Ranke's, was by the communications theorist Walter R. Fisher, who is often credited with originating the term. Fisher wrote that 'many different root metaphors have been put forth to represent the essential nature of human beings: homo faber, homo economicous, homo politicus, homo sociologicus, "psychological man", "ecclesiastical man", homo sapiens, and, of course, "rational man". I now propose homo narrans to be added to the list.'

== Appearances in popular culture ==
The fantasy book The Science of Discworld II: The Globe concludes with the words 'Plenty of creatures are intelligent, but only one tells stories. That's us: Pan narrans. And what about Homo sapiens? Yes, we think that would be a very good idea...' (The last sentence is an allusion to a quote attributed to Gandhi, included in a footnote earlier in the book, when asked what he thought of Western civilisation on a visit to London.)
