= Causal theory =

Causal theory may refer to:

- Causal decision theory of evaluating the expected utility of an action
- Causal sets theory, an approach to quantum physics
- Causal perturbation theory, a mathematically rigorous approach to renormalization theory
- Causal theories, a phenomenon in social psychology whereby humans guess wrongly about the reasons for their actions (part of the Introspection illusion)
