= Arif Ahmed =

Arif Ahmed may refer to:

- Arif Ahmed (cricketer), Bangladeshi cricketer
- Arif Ahmed (philosopher), English philosopher
