= James Joyce (disambiguation) =

James Joyce (1882–1941) was an Irish modernist avant-garde novelist and poet.

James Joyce may also refer to:

- James Parker Joyce (1835–1903), New Zealand politician from Southland
- James Joyce (congressman) (1870–1931), U.S. Representative from Ohio
- James Joyce (rugby union) (fl. 1903), Australian rugby union player
- James Joyce (athlete) (born 1936), Australian Olympic hurdler
- James M. Joyce, a philosophy professor at the University of Michigan
- Jim Joyce (born 1955), Major League Baseball umpire
- LÉ James Joyce, a ship of the Irish Naval Service
- James Joyce (biography), a 1959 biography by Richard Ellmann
- MS James Joyce, Ferry operating for Irish Ferries
