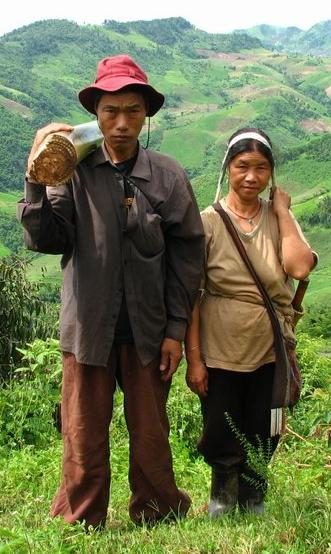
- An adult human male (left) and female (right) from the Akha tribe in Northern Thailand

Scientific classification
- Kingdom: Animalia
- Phylum: Chordata
- Class: Mammalia
- Order: Primates
- Superfamily: Hominoidea
- Family: Hominidae
- Genus: Homo
- Species: H. sapiens

Binomial name
- Homo sapiens Linnaeus, 1758

Subspecies
- †Homo sapiens idaltu White et al., 2003; Homo sapiens sapiens

Synonyms
- Species synonymy: aethiopicus Bory de St. Vincent, 1825; americanus Bory de St. Vincent, 1825; arabicus Bory de St. Vincent, 1825; aurignacensis Klaatsch & Hauser, 1910; australasicus Bory de St. Vincent, 1825; cafer Bory de St. Vincent, 1825; capensis Broom, 1917; columbicus Bory de St. Vincent, 1825; cro-magnonensis Gregory, 1921; drennani Kleinschmidt, 1931; eurafricanus (Sergi, 1911); grimaldiensis Gregory, 1921; grimaldii Lapouge, 1906; hottentotus Bory de St. Vincent, 1825; hyperboreus Bory de St. Vincent, 1825; indicus Bory de St. Vincent, 1825; japeticus Bory de St. Vincent, 1825; melaninus Bory de St. Vincent, 1825; monstrosus Linnaeus, 1758; neptunianus Bory de St. Vincent, 1825; palestinus McCown & Keith, 1932; patagonus Bory de St. Vincent, 1825; priscus Lapouge, 1899; proto-aethiopicus Giuffrida-Ruggeri, 1915; scythicus Bory de St. Vincent, 1825; sinicus Bory de St. Vincent, 1825; spelaeus Lapouge, 1899; troglodytes Linnaeus, 1758; wadjakensis Dubois, 1921

= Names for the human species =

Human

In addition to the generally accepted taxonomic name Homo sapiens (Latin: 'wise man', Linnaeus 1758), other Latin-based names for the human species have been created to refer to various aspects of the human character.

The common name of the human species in English is historically man (from Germanic mann), often replaced by the partly Latinate phrase human being (since the 16th century).

== In the world's languages ==
The Indo-European languages have a number of inherited terms for mankind. The etymon of man is found in the Germanic languages, and is cognate with Manu, the name of the human progenitor in Hindu mythology, and found in Indic terms for man (including manuṣya, manush, and manava).

Latin homo is derived from the Indo-European root dʰǵʰm- 'earth', as it were, 'earthling'. It has cognates in Baltic (Old Prussian zmūi), Germanic (Gothic guma) and Celtic (Old Irish duine). This is comparable to the explanation given in the Genesis narrative to the Hebrew Adam (אָדָם) 'man', derived from a word for 'red, reddish-brown'. Etymologically, it may be an ethnic or racial classification (after "reddish" skin colour contrasting with both "white" and "black"), but Genesis takes it to refer to the reddish colour of earth, as in the narrative the first man is formed from earth.

Other Indo-European languages name man for his mortality, *mr̥tós meaning 'mortal', so in Armenian mard, Persian mard, Sanskrit marta and Greek βροτός meaning 'mortal, human'. This is comparable to the Semitic word for 'man', represented by Arabic insan إنسان (cognate with Hebrew ʼenōš אֱנוֹשׁ), from a root for 'sick, mortal'. The Arabic word has been influential in the Islamic world, and was adopted in many Turkic languages. The native Turkic word is kiši.

Greek ἄνθρωπος (anthropos) is of uncertain, possibly pre-Greek origin. Slavic čelověkъ also is of uncertain etymology.

The Chinese character used in East Asian languages is 人, originating as a pictogram of a human being. The reconstructed Old Chinese pronunciation of the Chinese word is /ni[ŋ]/. A Proto-Sino-Tibetan r-mi(j)-n gives rise to Old Chinese /*miŋ/, modern Chinese 民 mín 'people' and to Tibetan མི mi 'person, human being'.

In some languages and tribal or band societies, the local endonym is indistinguishable from the word for 'people, men, human beings'. Examples include: Ainu ainu, Inuktitut: inuk, Bantu: bantu, Khoekhoe: khoe-khoe, possibly in Uralic: Mansi mäńćī, mańśi, from Proto-Ugric *mańć- 'man, person'.

== In philosophy ==
The mixture of serious and tongue-in-cheek self-designation originates with Plato, who on one hand defined man taxonomically as a "featherless biped", and on the other as ζῷον πολιτικόν (zōon politikon), as "political" or "state-building animal" (Aristotle's term, based on Plato's Statesman).

Harking back to Plato's zōon politikon are a number of later descriptions of man as an animal with a certain characteristic. Notably animal rationabile "animal capable of rationality", a term used in medieval scholasticism (with reference to Aristotle), and also used by Carl Linnaeus (1760) and Immanuel Kant (1798). Based on the same pattern are animal sociale or 'social animal', animal laborans 'laboring animal' (Hannah Arendt 1958), and animal symbolicum 'symbolizing animal' (Ernst Cassirer 1944).

== Etymology ==
The binomial name Homo sapiens was coined by Carl Linnaeus.

== List of binomial names ==
The following names mimic binomial nomenclature, mostly consisting of Homo followed by a Latin adjective characterizing human nature. Most of them were coined since the mid 20th century in imitation of Homo sapiens in order to make some philosophical point (either serious or ironic), but some go back to the 18th to 19th century, as in Homo aestheticus vs. Homo oeconomicus; Homo loquens is a serious suggestion by Herder, taking the human species as defined by the use of language; Homo creator is medieval, coined by Nicolaus Cusanus in reference to man as imago Dei.

Name	Translation	Notes
Homo absconditus	"man the inscrutable"	Soloveitchik, 1965 Lonely Man of Faith
Homo absurdus	"absurd man"	Giovanni Patriarca Homo Economicus, Absurdus, or Viator? 2014
Homo adaptabilis	"adaptable man"	Giovanni Patriarca Homo Economicus, Absurdus, or Viator? 2014
Homo adorans	"worshipping man"	Man as a worshipping agent, a servant of God or gods.
Homo aestheticus	"aesthetic man"	In Goethe's Wilhelm Meisters Lehrjahre, the main antagonist of Homo oeconomicus in the internal conflict tormenting the philosopher. Homo aestheticus is "man the aristocrat" in feelings and emotions. Dissanayake (1992) uses the term to suggest that the emergence of art was central to the formation of the human species.
Homo amans	"loving man"	Man as a loving agent; Humberto Maturana 2008
Homo animalis	"man with a soul"	Man as in possession of an animus sive mens (a soul or mind), Heidegger (1975).
Homo apathetikos	"apathetic man"	Used by Abraham Joshua Heschel in his book The Prophets to refer to the Stoic notion of the ideal human being, one who has attained apatheia.
Homo avarus	"man the greedy"	Used for man "activated by greed" by Barnett (1977).
Homo combinans	"combining man"	Man as the only species that performs the unbounded combinatorial operations that underlie syntax and possibly other cognitive capacities; Cedric Boeckx 2009.
Homo communicans	"communicating man"	
Homo contaminatus	"contaminated man"	Suggested by Romeo (1979) alongside Homo inquinatus ("polluted man") "to designate contemporary Man polluted by his own technological advances".
Homo creator	"creator man"	Due to Nicolaus Cusanus in reference to man as imago Dei; expanded to Homo alter deus by K.-O. Apel (1955).
Homo degeneratus	"degenerative man"	A man or the mankind as a whole if they undergo any regressive development (devolution); Andrej Poleev 2013
Homo demens	"mad man"	Man as the only being with irrational delusions. Edgar Morin, 1973 The Lost Paradigm: Human Nature
Homo deus	"human god"	Man as god, endowed with supernatural abilities such as eternal life as outlined in Yuval Noah Harari's 2015 book Homo Deus: A Brief History of Tomorrow
Homo dictyous	"network man"	Humankind as having a brain evolved for social connections
Homo discens	"learning man"	Human capability to learn and adapt, Heinrich Roth, Theodor Wilhelm
Homo documentator	"documenting man"	Human need and propensity to document and organize knowledge, Suzanne Briet in What Is Documentation?, 1951
Homo domesticus	"domestic man"	A human conditioned by the built environment; Oscar Carvajal, 2005 Derrick Jensen, 2006
Homo donans et recipiens	"giving and receiving (hu)man"	A human conditioned by free gifting and receiving; Genevieve Vaughan, 2021
Homo duplex	"double man"	Georges-Louis Leclerc, Comte de Buffon, 1754. Honoré de Balzac, 1846. Joseph Conrad, 1903. The idea of the double or divided man is developed by Émile Durkheim (1912) to figure the interaction of man's animal and social tendencies.
Homo economicus	"economic man"	Man as a rational and self-interested agent (19th century)
Homo educandus	"to be educated"	Human need of education before reaching maturity, Heinrich Roth 1966
Homo ethicus	"ethical man"	Man as an ethical agent.
Homo excentricus	"not self-centered"	Human capability for objectivity, human self-reflection, theory of mind, Helmuth Plessner, 1928
Homo faber	"toolmaker man" "fabricator man" "worker man"	Karl Marx, Kenneth Oakley 1949, Max Frisch 1957, Hannah Arendt.
Homo ferox	"ferocious man"	T. H. White 1958
Homo generosus	"generous man"	Tor Nørretranders, Generous Man (2005)
Homo geographicus	"man in place"	Robert D. Sack, Homo Geographicus (1997)
Homo grammaticus	"grammatical man"	Human use of grammar, language, Frank Palmer 1971
Homo hierarchicus	"hierarchical man"	Louis Dumont 1966
Homo humanus	"human man"	Used as a term for mankind considered as human in the cultural sense, as opposed to homo biologicus, man considered as a biological species (and thus synonymous with Homo sapiens); the distinction was made in these terms by John N. Deely (1973).
Homo hypocritus	"hypocritical man"	Robin Hanson (2010); also called "man the sly rule bender"
Homo imitans	"imitating man"	Human capability of learning and adapting by imitation, Andrew N. Meltzoff 1988, Jürgen Lethmate 1992
Homo inermis	"helpless man"	Man as defenseless, unprotected, devoid of animal instincts. J. F. Blumenbach 1779, J. G. Herder 1784–1791, Arnold Gehlen 1940
Homo interrogans	"questioning man"	The human is a questioning or inquiring being, a being who not only asks questions but is capable of questioning or questing without there being an object referent for the inquiry itself and capable of ever-asking. Abraham Joshua Heschel discussed this idea in his 1965 book Who is Man? but John Bruin coined the term in his 2001 book Homo Interrogans: Questioning and the Intentional Structure of Cognition
Homo ignorans	"ignorant man"	Antonym to sciens (Bazán 1972, Romeo 1979:64)
Homo interreticulatus	"buried-within-the-rectangle man"	Used by philosopher David Bentley Hart to describe humanity lost within the screens of computers and other devices
Homo investigans	"investigating man"	Human curiosity and capability to learn by deduction, Werner Luck 1976
Homo juridicus	"juridical man"	Homo juridicus identifies normative primacy of law, Alain Supiot, 2007.
Homo laborans	"working man"	Human capability for division of labour, specialization and expertise in craftsmanship and, Theodor Litt 1948
Homo liturgicus	"the man who participates with others in rituals that recognize and enact meaning"	Philosopher James K. A. Smith uses this terms to describe a basic way in which humans dwell together with habitual practices that both embody and reorient us toward shared higher goods.
Homo logicus	"the man who wants to understand"	Homo logicus are driven by an irresistible desire to understand how things work. By contrast, Homo sapiens have a strong desire for success. Alan Cooper, 1999
Homo loquens	"talking man"	Man as the only animal capable of language, J. G. Herder 1772, J. F. Blumenbach 1779.
Homo loquax	"chattering man"	parody variation of Homo loquens, used by Henri Bergson (1943), Tom Wolfe (2006), also in A Canticle for Leibowitz (1960).
Homo ludens	"playing man"	Friedrich Schiller (1795); Johan Huizinga, Homo Ludens (1938); Hideo Kojima (2016). The characterization of human culture as essentially bearing the character of play.
Homo mechanicus	"mechanical man"	Man crammed with machinery and bionics, obsessed with machinery, that perceives the world as assortment of tools and instruments
Homo mendax	"lying man"	Man with the ability to tell lies. Fernando Vallejo
Homo metaphysicus	"metaphysical man"	Arthur Schopenhauer, 1819
Homo narrans	"storytelling man"	man not only as an intelligent species, but also as the only one who tells stories, used by Walter Fisher in 1984. Also Pan narrans "storytelling ape" in The Science of Discworld II: The Globe by Terry Pratchett, Ian Stewart and Jack Cohen
Homo necans	"killing man"	Walter Burkert, 1972
Homo neophilus and Homo neophobus	"Novelty-loving man" and "Novelty-fearing man", respectively	coined by characters in the Illuminatus! Trilogy by Robert Shea and Robert Anton Wilson to describe two distinct types of human being: one which seeks out and embraces new ideas and situations (neophilus), and another which clings to habit and fears the new (neophobus).
Homo otiosus	"slacker man"	The 11th Edition of The Encyclopædia Britannica defines man as "a seeker after the greatest degree of comfort for the least necessary expenditure of energy". In The Restless Compendium Michael Greaney credits Sociologist Robert Stebbins with coining the term "homo otiosus" to refer to the privileged economic class of "persons of leisure", asserting that a distinctiveness of humans is that they (unlike other animals and machines) are capable of intentional laziness.
Homo patiens	"suffering man"	Human capability for suffering, Viktor Frankl 1988
Homo viator	"man the pilgrim"	Man as on his way towards finding God, Gabriel Marcel, 1945
Homo pictor	"depicting man", "man the artist"	Human sense of aesthetics, Hans Jonas, 1961
Homo poetica	"man the poet", "man the meaning maker"	Ernest Becker, in The Structure of Evil: An Essay on the Unification of the Science of Man (1968).
Homo religiosus	"religious man"	Alister Hardy
Homo ridens	"laughing man"	G. B. Milner, 1969
Homo reciprocans	"reciprocal man"	man as a cooperative actor who is motivated by improving his environment and wellbeing; Samuel Bowles and Herbert Gintis, 1997
Homo sacer	"the sacred man" or "the accursed man"	in Roman law, a person who is banned and may be killed by anybody, but may not be sacrificed in a religious ritual. Italian philosopher Giorgio Agamben takes the concept as the starting point of his main work Homo Sacer: Sovereign Power and Bare Life (1998)
Homo sanguinis	"bloody man"	A comment on human foreign relations and the increasing ability of man to wage war by anatomist W. M. Cobb in the Journal of the National Medical Association in 1969 and 1975.
Homo sciens	"knowing man"	Used by Siger of Brabant, noted as a precedent of Homo sapiens by Bazán (1972) (Romeo 1979:128)
Homo sentimentalis	"sentimental man"	man born to a civilization of sentiment, who has raised feelings to a category of value; the human ability to empathize, but also to idealize emotions and make them servants of ideas. Milan Kundera in Immortality (1990), Eugene Halton in Bereft of Reason: On the Decline of Social Thought and Prospects for Its Renewal (1995).
Homo socius	"social man"	Man as a social being. Inherent to humans as long as they have not lived entirely in isolation. Peter Berger & Thomas Luckmann in The Social Construction of Reality (1966).
Homo sociologicus	"sociological man"	parody term; the human species as prone to sociology, Ralf Dahrendorf.
Homo Sovieticus	(Dog Latin for "Soviet Man")	A sarcastic and critical reference to an average conformist person in the USSR and other countries of the Eastern Bloc. The term was popularized by Soviet writer and sociologist Aleksandr Zinovyev, who wrote the book titled Homo Sovieticus.
Homo Spiritualis	"Spiritual man"	Due to historian of European religious history Steven Ozment.
Homo superior	"superior man"	Coined by the titular character in Olaf Stapledon's novel Odd John (1935) to refer to superpowered mutants like himself. Also occurs in Marvel Comics' The X-Men (1963–present), the BBC series The Tomorrow People (1973–1979), and David Bowie's song "Oh! You Pretty Things" 1971.
Homo symbolicus	"symbolic culture man"	The emergence of symbolic culture. 2011 [Editors Christopher S. Henshilwood and Francesco d'Errico, Homo Symbolicus: The dawn of language, imagination and spirituality
Homo sympathetikos	"sympathetic man"	The term used by Abraham Joshua Heschel in his book The Prophets to refer to the prophetic ideal for humans: sympathetic feeling or sharing in the concerns of others, the highest expression of which is sharing in God's concern, feeling, or pathos.
Homo technologicus	"technological man"	Yves Gingras 2005, similar to homo faber, in a sense of man creating technology as an antithesis to nature.
Homo terrans	"Earth humans"	as in contrast to Homo ares (or Homo martial): 'Mars human'
Homo urbanus	"Urban humans"/urbanites	Prepotenska and Lose
Jocko Homo	"ape-man"	Coined and defined by Bertram Henry Shadduck in his 1924 tract Jocko-Homo Heavenbound the phrase gained prominence via the release DEVO's 1977 song "Jocko Homo".

== In fiction ==
In fiction, specifically science fiction and fantasy, occasionally names for the human species are introduced reflecting the fictional situation of humans existing alongside other, non-human civilizations. In science fiction, Earthling (also Terran, Earther, and Gaian) is frequently used, as it were naming humanity by its planet of origin. Incidentally, this situation parallels the naming motive of ancient terms for humanity, including human (homo, humanus) itself, derived from a word for 'earth' to contrast earth-bound humans with celestial beings (i.e. deities) in mythology.

== See also ==
- Cultural universal
- Übermensch
