= Platonia dilemma =

Game theory introduced in Douglas Hofstadter's book Metamagical Themas

In the platonia dilemma introduced in Douglas Hofstadter's book Metamagical Themas, an eccentric trillionaire gathers 20 people together, and tells them that if one and only one of them sends them a telegram (reverse charges) by noon the next day, that person will receive a billion dollars. If they receive more than one telegram, or none at all, no one will get any money, and cooperation between players is forbidden. In this situation, the superrational thing to do is to send a telegram with probability 1/20.

== Luring Lottery ==
A similar game, referred to as a "Luring Lottery", was actually played by the editors of Scientific American in the 1980s. To enter the contest once, readers had to send in a postcard with the number "1" written on it. They were also explicitly permitted to submit as many entries as they wished by sending in a single postcard bearing the number of entries they wished to submit. The prize was one million dollars divided by the total number of entries received, to be awarded to the submitter of a randomly chosen entry. Thus a reader who submitted a large number of entries increased their chances of winning but reduced the maximum possible value of the prize. It can be shown mathematically that one maximizes one's average winnings in this game by submitting a number of entries equal to the total number of entries of others. Of course, if others take this into account, then this strategy translates into a runaway reaction to unbounded number of entries being submitted.

According to the magazine, the superrational thing was for each contestant to roll a simulated die with the number of sides equal to the number of expected responders (about 5% of the readership), and then send "1" if you roll "1". If all contestants had followed this strategy, it is possible that the magazine would have received a single postcard, with a "1", and would have had to pay a million dollars to the sender of that postcard. Reputedly the publisher and owners were very concerned about betting the company on a game.

Although the magazine had previously discussed the concept of superrationality from which the above-mentioned algorithm can be deduced, many of the contestants submitted entries consisting of an astronomically large number (including several who entered a googolplex). Some took this game further by filling their postcards with mathematical expressions designed to evaluate to the largest possible number in the limited space allowed. As a result, the contestants caused the prize to become moot (as it would have been a minuscule fraction of a cent) and the magazine was unable to tell who won the prize.

== See also ==
- Metamagical Themas
- Superrationality

== Sources ==
- William Poundstone, Prisoner's Dilemma, Doubleday, NY 1992, pp. 272–276.
