= Homo duplex =

Homo duplex is a view promulgated by Émile Durkheim, a macro-sociologist of the 19th century, saying that a man on the one hand is a biological organism, driven by instincts, with desire and appetite and on the other hand is being led by morality and other elements generated by society. For Durkheim, what enables human beings to transcend their individual, bodily nature is participation in collective life. Institutions, most prominently religious and educational ones, provide the concepts, moral norms, and categories of thought that individuals internalize through socialization.

Left unchecked the individualism leads to a lifetime of seeking to slake selfish desires which leads to unhappiness and despair. On the other hand, collective conscience serves as a check on the will. This is created by socialisation. Highly anomic societies are characterized by weak primary group ties—family, church, community, and other such groups.

== Quotes ==
Émile Durkheim

Far from being simple, our inner life has something like a double centre of gravity. On the one hand is our individuality ... On the other is everything in us that expresses something other than ourselves. Not only are these two groups of states of consciousness different in their origins and their properties, but there is a true antagonism between them.

David Foster Wallace

But the young educated adults of the 90s got to watch all this brave new individualism and self-expression and sexual freedom deteriorate into the joyless and anomic self-indulgence of the Me Generation. Today's sub-40s have different horrors, prominent among which are anomie and solipsism and a peculiarly American loneliness: the prospect of dying without once having loved something more than yourself.

Sigmund Freud used these ideas in his essay Civilization and Its Discontents; he wrote civilisation is created through restraint – is "built up upon a renunciation of instinct".

== See also ==
- Homo economicus
- Homo Hierarchicus
- Names for the human species
- Suicide by Émile Durkheim.
