= Homo reciprocans =

Homo reciprocans, or reciprocating human, is the concept in some economic theories of humans as cooperative actors who are motivated by improving their environment through positive reciprocity (rewarding other individuals) or negative reciprocity (punishing other individuals), even in situations without foreseeable benefit for themselves.

This concept stands in contrast to the idea of homo economicus, which states the opposite theory that human beings are exclusively motivated by self-interest. However, the two ideas can be reconciled if we assume that utility functions of the homo economicus can have parameters that are dependent to the perceived utility of other agents (such as one's spouse or children).

== Kropotkin ==
Russian theorist Peter Kropotkin wrote about the concept of "mutual aid" in the early part of the 20th century.

== Examples ==
The Homo reciprocans concept states that human being players interact with a propensity to cooperate. They will compromise in order to achieve a balance between what is best for them and what is best for the environment they are a part of. Homo reciprocans players, however, also are motivated by justification. If a second player is perceived as having done something wrong or insulting, the first player is willing to "take a hit", even with no foreseeable benefits, in order for the second player to suffer.

A common example of this interaction is the haggler and shopkeeper. If the haggler wants a deal and the shopkeeper wants a sale, the haggler must carefully choose a price for the shopkeeper to consider. The shopkeeper will consider a lower price (or a price in between) based on the benefit of selling a product. If the haggler's offer is a low-ball, which may be offensive to the shopkeeper, the shopkeeper may refuse simply on the grounds that he is offended, and will knowingly and purposely lose the sale.

== Positive and negative reciprocity ==
Reciprocal players are willing to reward behaviour that is just or fair, and to punish unjust or unfair behaviour. Empirical evidence suggests that positive and negative reciprocity are fundamentally different behavioral dispositions in the sense that the values for positive and negative reciprocity in individuals are only weakly correlated and that these values correlate differently with factors such as gender or age. A possible explanation is "that negative and positive reciprocity are different because they tap into different emotional responses".

Positive reciprocity correlates with height, with increasing age, with female gender, with higher income as well as higher number of hours of work, with a higher number of friends and with higher overall life satisfaction. Evidence indicates that "married individuals are more positively reciprocal, but are not different from the unmarried in terms of negative reciprocity". Among employees, negative reciprocity appear to be correlated with a higher number of sick days. Positive reciprocity correlates with low unemployment, and negative reciprocity strongly correlates with unemployment. High levels of positive reciprocity correlate with higher income, but no correlation appears to exist between negative reciprocity and income.

== Determining Propensity to Reciprocate of Homo Reciprocans ==
=== Sex, Age, and Height ===
A study conducted by Thomas Dohmen and his team of behavioral economists investigated the determinants of trust and reciprocity, in which their results indicated that women hold a higher propensity to trust and, thus reciprocate, than men. This finding is echoed by Warneken and Tomasello’s study on reciprocity in children, through which they found that girls are more prosocial than boys.

Thomas Dohmen and his team of behavioral economists also found a positive correlation between both age and height and one’s trust, meaning that the taller a person is, the more willing they are to trust, and the same idea applies to age—the older one gets, the more trusting they are.

Ernst Fehr and Simon Gächter, professors of behavioral economics at the University of Zurich, discovered through their study that women and the elderly are more apt to perform reciprocal behaviors.

=== Personality ===
Dohmen’s study on the Big 5 personality types as determinants of trust and reciprocity concluded that all personality types impact one’s propensity to reciprocate positively. On the other hand, in regards to negative reciprocity, they found that extraversion and openness have little to no effect, but people who land on the higher end of the neuroticism spectrum tend to be more negatively reciprocal, while those who are more conscientious and agreeable tend to be less so.

=== Culture ===
Cultural psychologists Joan Miller and David Bersoff, in an experimental study in 1994, found that Americans receive greater utility in providing help under a reciprocity condition than without one; on the other hand, Indians displayed virtually no difference in utility with or without a prior reciprocal occasion.

In a similar study conducted by Miller and seven other psychologists, they found that Indians base their reciprocal acts on communal norms while Americans’ are contingent on reciprocal exchanges. An example of such difference is that Indians act upon their peers’ requests for assistance repeatedly throughout their lifetimes, whereas Americans show reciprocal behaviors shortly, and only, after altruistic acts were performed towards them.

=== Perceived Motives ===
Yesim Orhun, a professor of marketing at the University of Michigan Ross School Business, emphasizes the significance of people’s perceived dispositions in reciprocal situations in her research on perceived motives and reciprocity. She asserts that generosity becomes polluted if the impression of an expected return of favor is given during an act of kindness. However, she also notes that perceived kindness is only a factor in positive reciprocity because the intentions of a person who commits harmful acts are apparent, but those of a person who performs beneficial acts are ambiguous, unsure of intentions behind.

== See also ==
- Agent (economics)
- Behavioral economics
- Dictator game
- Gift-exchange game
- Economic rationalism
- Gratitude
- Herbert Gintis
- Homo biologicus
- Homo duplex
- Homo economicus
- List of alternative names for the human species
- Modern portfolio theory
- Moral psychology
- Pirate game
- Post-autistic economics
- Rational agent
- Rational choice theory
- Rational pricing
- Samuel Bowles
- Strong reciprocity
