= Gary Drescher =

American artificial intelligence scientist

Gary L. Drescher
- Known for: Schema Mechanism, Multiple Worlds Interpretation, defenses of determinism and mechanistic materialism
- Notable work: Made-Up Minds: A Constructivist Approach to Artificial Intelligence, Good and Real: Demystifying Paradoxes from Physics to Ethics
- Scientific career
- Fields: Artificial intelligence, Cognitive science, Philosophy
- Institutions: Center for Cognitive Studies, Tufts University

Gary L. Drescher is a scientist in the field of artificial intelligence (AI), and author of multiple books on AI, including Made-Up Minds: A Constructivist Approach to Artificial Intelligence.

His book describes a theory of how a computer program might be implemented to learn and use new concepts that have not been programmed into it. It introduces the Schema Mechanism, a general learning and concept-building mechanism inspired by Jean Piaget's account of human cognitive development.

The Schema Mechanism is intended to replicate key aspects of cognitive development during infancy. It takes Piaget's theory of human development as a source of inspiration for an artificial learning mechanism, and it extends and tests Piaget's theory by seeing whether a specific mechanism that works according to Piagetian themes exhibits Piagetian abilities.

In 2001 and 2002, Drescher was a visiting fellow at the Center for Cognitive Studies at Tufts University, which was directed by the American philosopher Daniel Dennett. Following his work at Tufts, he wrote the 2006 book Good and Real: Demystifying Paradoxes from Physics to Ethics, in which he defends rigorously mechanistic materialism. In this book, he discusses quantum mechanics, defending the Everett or Multiple Worlds Interpretation, against the dominant Copenhagen Interpretation. Among other things, he argues that the Everett Interpretation of quantum mechanics, allows for a completely determinist outlook, and it undermines the views of those (like Roger Penrose) who hold that quantum mechanics can give us some special insights into the nature of consciousness. In this book, Drescher also provides treatments of the Prisoner's Dilemma and Newcomb's Problem to build a defense of the golden rule and Kant's categorical imperative which does not require that we posit anything beyond the physical world as understood by the natural sciences.
