= Kavka's toxin puzzle =

Thought experiment about intention and action

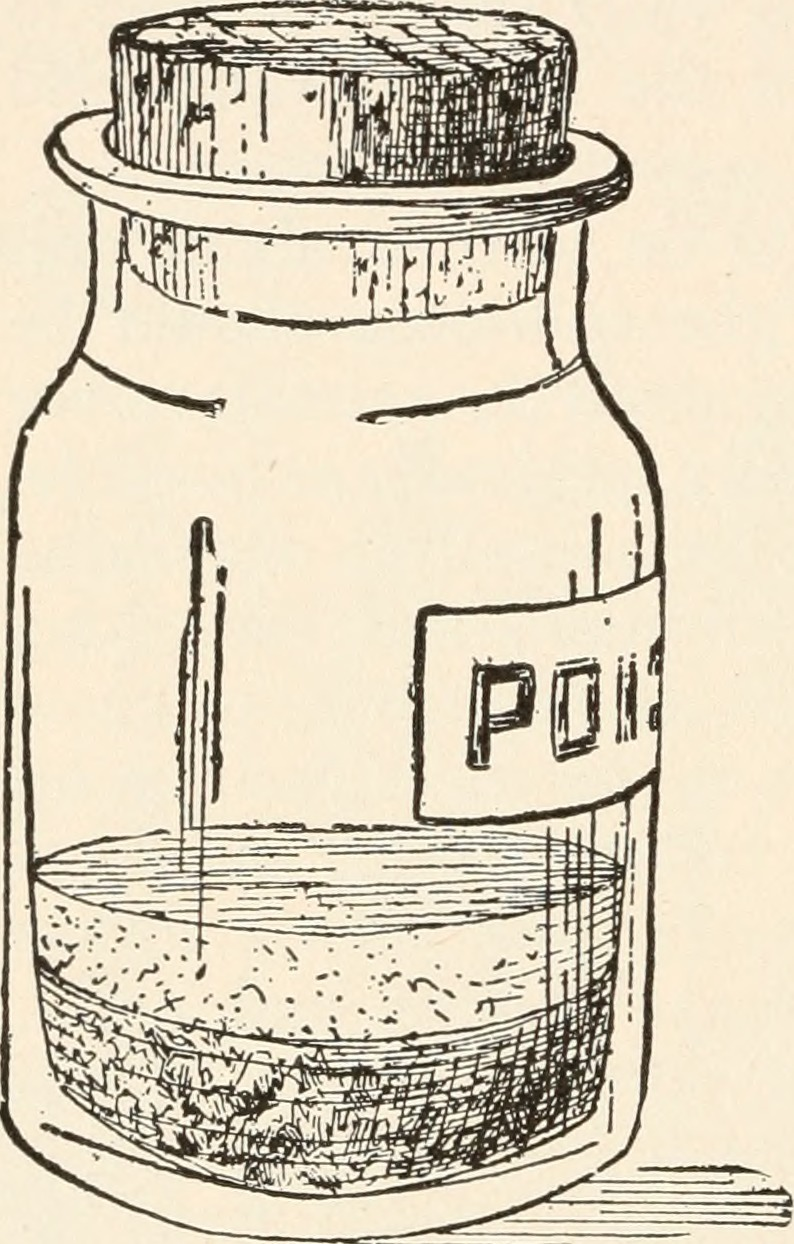
A vial of poison.

Kavka's toxin puzzle is a thought experiment about the possibility of forming an intention to perform an act which, following from reason, is an action one would not actually perform. It was presented by moral and political philosopher Gregory S. Kavka in "The Toxin Puzzle" (1983), and grew out of his work in deterrence theory and mutual assured destruction. The thought experiment involves a vial of poison.

== Puzzle ==
Kavka's original version of the puzzle is the following:

An eccentric billionaire places before you a vial of toxin that, if you drink it, will make you painfully ill for a day, but will not threaten your life or have any lasting effects. The billionaire will pay you one million dollars tomorrow morning if, at midnight tonight, you intend to drink the toxin tomorrow afternoon. He emphasizes that you need not drink the toxin to receive the money; in fact, the money will already be in your bank account hours before the time for drinking it arrives, if you succeed. All you have to do is ... intend at midnight tonight to drink the stuff tomorrow afternoon. You are perfectly free to change your mind after receiving the money and not drink the toxin.

A possible interpretation: Can you intend to drink the toxin if you also intend to change your mind at a later time?

== Paradox ==
The paradoxical nature can be stated in many ways, which may be useful for understanding analysis proposed by philosophers:

- In line with Newcomb's paradox, an omniscient pay-off mechanism makes a person's decision known to him before he makes the decision, but it is also assumed that the person may change his decision afterwards, of free will.
- Similarly in line with Newcomb's paradox; Kavka's claim, that one cannot intend what one will not do, makes pay-off mechanism an example of reverse causation.
- Pay-off for decision to drink the poison is ambiguous.
- There are two decisions for one event with different pay-offs.

Since the pain caused by the poison would be more than off-set by the money received, we can sketch the pay-off table as follows.

Pay-offs (Initial analysis)
Intent Action	Intend	Do not intend
Drink	90	−10
Do not drink	100	0

According to Kavka: Drinking the poison is never to your advantage regardless of whether you are paid. A rational person would know he would not drink the poison and thus could not intend to drink it.

Pay-offs (According to Kavka)
Intent Action	Intend	Do not intend
Drink	Impossible	−10
Do not drink	Impossible	0

David Gauthier argues once a person intends drinking the poison one cannot entertain ideas of not drinking it.

The rational outcome of your deliberation tomorrow morning is the action that will be part of your life going as well as possible, subject to the constraint that it be compatible with your commitment—in this case, compatible with the sincere intention that you form today to drink the toxin. And so the rational action is to drink the toxin.

Pay-offs (According to Gauthier)
Intent Action	Intend	Do not intend
Drink	90	−10
Do not drink	Impossible	0

One of the central tenets of the puzzle is that for a reasonable person

- There is reasonable grounds for that person to intend to drink the toxin, since some reward may be obtained.
- Having come to the above conclusion there is no reasonable grounds for that person to drink the toxin, since no further reward may be obtained, and no reasonable person would partake in self-harm for no benefit.

Thus a reasonable person must intend to drink the toxin by the first argument, yet if that person intends to drink the toxin, he is being irrational by the second argument.

== See also ==
- Doublethink
- Prisoner's dilemma
