= Man (word) =

English word

The term man (from Proto-Germanic *mann- 'person') and words derived from it can designate any or even all of the human race regardless of their sex or age. In traditional usage, man (without an article) itself refers to the species or to humanity (mankind) as a whole.

The Germanic word developed into Old English mann. In Old English, the word still primarily meant "person" or "human," and was used for men, women, and children alike. The sense "adult male" was very rare, at least in the written language. That meaning is not recorded at all until about the year 1000, over a hundred years after the writings of Alfred the Great and perhaps nearly three centuries after Beowulf. Male and female gender qualifiers were used with mann in compound words.

Adopting the term for humans in general to refer to men is a common development of Romance and Germanic languages, but is not found in most other European languages (Slavic *čelověkъ vs. *mǫžь, Greek ἄνθρωπος vs. άνδρας, Finnish ihminen vs. mies etc.).

== Etymology ==
According to one etymology, Proto-Germanic *man-n- is derived from a Proto-Indo-European root *man-, *mon- or *men- (see Sanskrit/Avestan manu-, Slavic *mǫž "man, male"). The Slavic forms (Russian muzh "man, male" etc.) are derived from a suffixed stem *man-gyo-.

In Hindu mythology, Manu is the name of the traditional progenitor of humankind who survives a deluge and gives mankind laws. The hypothetically reconstructed Proto-Indo-European form *Manus may also have played a role in Proto-Indo-European religion based on this, if there is any connection with the figure of Mannus — reported by the Roman historian Tacitus in ca. AD 70 to be the name of a traditional ancestor of the Germanic peoples and son of Tuisto; modern sources other than Tacitus have reinterpreted this as "first man".

In Old English the words wer and wīf were used to refer to "a male" and "a female" respectively, while mann had the primary meaning of "person" or "human" regardless of gender. Both wer and wyf may be used to qualify "man"; for example:

God gesceop ða æt fruman twegen men, wer and wif
(then at the beginning, God created two human beings, man and woman)

These terms are also used to qualify compounds; wifmann (variant wimman) developed into the modern word "woman". Wæpned also meant "male", and was used to qualify "man": wæpnedmann (variant wepman, "male person"). There was also the term wæpenwifestre, meaning either an armed woman, or a woman with a penis. These terms were not restricted to adults; Old English also used wæpnedcild and wifcild, literally "male-child" and "female-child". The Old English wer may survive today in the compound "werewolf" (from Old English werwulf, literally "man-wolf"). See wer.

Some etymologies treat the root as an independent one, as does the American Heritage Dictionary. Of the etymologies that do make connections with other Indo-European roots, man "the thinker" is the most traditional — that is, the word is connected with the root *men- "to think" (cognate to mind). This etymology relies on humans describing themselves as "those who think" (see Human self-reflection). This etymology, however, is not generally accepted. A second potential etymology connects with Latin manus ("hand"), which has the same form as Sanskrit manus.

Another etymology postulates the reduction of the ancestor of "human" to the ancestor of "man". Human is from *dhghem-, "earth", thus implying *(dh)ghom-on- would be an "earthdweller". The latter word, when reduced to just its final syllable, would be merely *m-on-. This is the view of Eric Partridge, Origins, under man. Such a derivation might be credible if only the Germanic form was known, but the attested Indo-Iranian manu virtually excludes the possibility. Moreover, *(dh)ghom-on- is known to have survived in Old English not as mann but as guma, the ancestor of the second element of the Modern English word bridegroom. However, there may have been a single lexeme whose paradigm eventually split into two distinct lexemes in Proto-Germanic. Moreover, according to Brugmann's law, Sanskrit mánu, with its short a, implies a PIE reconstruction *menu- rather than *monu-, which would lead to an expected but not attested cognate *minn- in Proto-Germanic.

In the late twentieth century, the generic meaning of "man" declined (but is also continued in compounds "mankind", "everyman", "no-man", etc.). The same thing has happened to the Latin word homo: in most of the Romance languages, homme, uomo, hombre, homem have come to refer mainly to males, with a residual generic meaning. The exception is Romanian, where om refers to a 'human', vs. bărbat (male).

The inflected forms of Old English mann are:

| | sg. | pl. |
|---|---|---|
| nom. | mann | menn |
| acc. | mann | menn |
| gen. | mannes | manna |
| dat. | menn | mannum |

The inflected forms of Old High German word for man (without i-mutation) are:

| | sg. | pl. |
|---|---|---|
| nom. | man | man |
| acc. | manann, also man | man |
| gen. | mannes | mannô |
| dat. | manne, also man | mannum, mannun, mannom, mannen |

The inflected forms of the Old Norse word for man, maðr, are:

| | sg. | pl. |
|---|---|---|
| nom. | maðr | menn |
| acc. | mann | menn |
| gen. | manns | manna |
| dat. | manni | mǫnnum |

== Modern usage ==
The word "man" is still used in its generic meaning in literary English.

The verb to man (i.e. "to furnish [a fortress or a ship] with a company of men") dates to early Middle English.

The word has been applied generally as a suffix in modern combinations like "fireman", "policeman", and "mailman". With social changes in the later 20th century, new gender-neutral terms were coined, such as "firefighter", "police officer", and "mail carrier", to redress the gender-specific connotations of occupational names. Social theorists argued that the confusion of man as human and man as male were linguistic symptoms of male-centric definitions of humanity.

In US American slang, "man!" also came to be used as an interjection, not necessarily addressing the listener but simply added for emphasis, much like "dude!".

In Juba to Jive: A Dictionary of African-American Slang (1994), Clarence Major explains how African Americans use “man” as “a form of address carrying respect and authority” and used by “black males to counteract the degrading effects of being addressed by whites as ‘boy’”.

Also, in American English, the expression "The Man", referring to "the oppressive powers that be", originated in the Southern United States in the 20th century, and became widespread in the urban underworld from the 1950s.

Use of man- as a prefix and in composition usually denotes the generic meaning of "human", as in mankind, man-eating, man-made, etc.. In some instances, when modifying gender-neutral nouns, the prefix may also denote masculine gender, as in manservant (17th century).

Between the late 2000s and early 2010s, man- was introduced as a prefix to terms such as mansplaining or manspreading in feminist jargon to denounce sexist attitudes "that have historically gone unnoticed".

== See also ==
- Were
- Names for the human species
- Last man
- Gender neutrality in English
- Manu and Yemo
