= Homo economicus =

Model of humans as rational, self-interested agents

The term Homo economicus, or economic man, is the portrayal of humans as agents who are consistently rational and narrowly self-interested, and who pursue their subjectively defined ends optimally. It is a wordplay on Homo sapiens, and is used in some economic theories and in pedagogy.

In game theory, Homo economicus is often (but not necessarily) modelled through the assumption of perfect rationality. It assumes that agents always act in a way that maximize utility as a consumer and profit as a producer, and are capable of arbitrarily complex deductions towards that end. They will always be capable of thinking through all possible outcomes and choosing that course of action which will result in the best possible result.

The rationality implied in Homo economicus does not restrict what sort of preferences are admissible. Only naive applications of the Homo economicus model assume that agents know what is best for their long-term physical and mental health. For example, an agent's utility function could be linked to the perceived utility of other agents (such as one's husband or children), making Homo economicus compatible with other models such as Homo reciprocans, which emphasizes human cooperation.

As a theory on human conduct, it contrasts to the concepts of behavioral economics, which examines cognitive biases and other irrationalities, and to bounded rationality, which assumes that practical elements such as cognitive and time limitations restrict the rationality of agents.

== History of the term ==
The term "economic man" was used for the first time in the late nineteenth century by critics of John Stuart Mill's work on political economy. Below is a passage from Mill's work that critics referred to:

[Political economy] does not treat the whole of man's nature as modified by the social state, nor of the whole conduct of man in society. It is concerned with him solely as a being who desires to possess wealth, and who is capable of judging the comparative efficacy of means for obtaining that end.

Later in the same work, Mill stated that he was proposing "an arbitrary definition of man, as a being who inevitably does that by which he may obtain the greatest amount of necessaries, conveniences, and luxuries, with the smallest quantity of labour and physical self-denial with which they can be obtained."

Adam Smith, in The Theory of Moral Sentiments, had claimed that individuals have sympathy for the well-being of others. On the other hand, in The Wealth of Nations, Smith wrote:

It is not from the benevolence of the butcher, the brewer, or the baker that we expect our dinner, but from their regard to their own interest.

The early role of Homo economicus within neoclassical theory was to discover general laws governing economic growth and welfare. These laws and principles were determined by two governing factors, natural and social. It had been found to be the foundation of neoclassical theory of the firm which assumed that individual agents would act rationally amongst other rational individuals. Within this framework, it was assumed that rational and self-interested actions would promote the efficient allocation of material resources. However, social scientists had doubted the actual importance of income and wealth to overall happiness in societies.

The term "Homo economicus" was initially critiqued for its portrayal of the economic agent as a narrowly defined, money-making animal, a characterization heavily influenced by the works of Adam Smith and John Stuart Mill. Authors from the English Historical School of Economics sought to demote this model from its broad classification under the 'genus homo', arguing that it insufficiently captured the complex ethical and behavioral dimensions of human decision-making. Their critique emphasized the need for a more nuanced understanding of human agency beyond the mere pursuit of economic rationality.

Economists in the late 19th century—such as Francis Edgeworth, William Stanley Jevons, Léon Walras, and Vilfredo Pareto—built mathematical models on these economic assumptions. In the 20th century, the rational choice theory of Lionel Robbins came to dominate mainstream economics. The term "economic man" then took on a more specific meaning: a person who acted rationally on complete knowledge out of self-interest and the desire for wealth.

The use of the Latin form Homo economicus is certainly long established; Persky traces it back to Pareto (1906) but notes that it may be older. The English term economic man can be found even earlier, in John Kells Ingram's A History of Political Economy (1888). The Oxford English Dictionary (O.E.D.) cites the use of Homo oeconomicus by C. S. Devas in his 1883 work The Groundwork of Economics in reference to Mill's writings, as one of a number of phrases that imitate the scientific name for the human species:

Mill has only examined the Homo oeconomicus, or dollar-hunting animal.

According to the OED, the human genus name Homo is

Used with L. or mock-L. adjs. in names imitating Homo sapiens, etc., and intended to personify some aspect of human life or behaviour (indicated by the adj.). Homo faber ("feIb@(r)) [H. Bergson L'Evolution Créatrice (1907) ii. 151], a term used to designate man as a maker of tools.) Variants are often comic: Homo insipiens; Homo turisticus.

Note that such forms should logically keep the capital for the "genus" name—i.e., Homo economicus rather than homo economicus. Actual usage is inconsistent.

== Model ==
Homo economicus is a term used for an approximation or model of Homo sapiens that acts to obtain the highest possible well-being for themself given available information about opportunities and other constraints, both natural and institutional, on their ability to achieve their predetermined goals. This approach has been formalized in certain social sciences models, particularly in economics.

Homo economicus is usually seen as "rational" in the sense that well-being as defined by the utility function is optimized given perceived opportunities. That is, the individual seeks to attain very specific and predetermined goals to the greatest extent with the least possible cost. Note that this kind of "rationality" does not say that the individual's actual goals are "rational" in some larger ethical, social, or human sense, only that they try to attain them at minimal cost. Only naïve applications of the Homo economicus model assume that this hypothetical individual knows what is best for their long-term physical and mental health and can be relied upon to always make the right decision for themself. See rational choice theory and rational expectations for further discussion; the article on rationality widens the discussion.

== Criticisms ==
=== Economists ===
Economists Thorstein Veblen, John Maynard Keynes, Herbert A. Simon, and many of the Austrian School criticise Homo economicus as an actor with too great an understanding of macroeconomics and economic forecasting in his decision making. They stress uncertainty and bounded rationality in the making of economic decisions, rather than relying on the rational man who is fully informed of all circumstances impinging on his decisions. They argue that perfect knowledge never exists, which means that all economic activity implies risk. Austrian economists rather prefer to use as a model tool the Homo agens.

Homo economicus assumptions have been criticized not only by economists on the basis of logical arguments, but also on empirical grounds by cross-cultural comparison. Economic anthropologists such as Marshall Sahlins, Karl Polanyi, Marcel Mauss and Maurice Godelier have demonstrated that in traditional societies, choices people make regarding production and exchange of goods follow patterns of reciprocity which differ sharply from what the Homo economicus model postulates. Such systems have been termed gift economy rather than market economy. Criticisms of the Homo economicus model put forward from the standpoint of ethics usually refer to this traditional ethic of kinship-based reciprocity that held together traditional societies. Philosophers Amartya Sen and Axel Honneth are noted for their criticisms of the normative assumptions made by the self-interested utility function.

Swiss economist Bruno Frey, points to the excessive emphasis on extrinsic motivation (rewards and punishments from the social environment) as opposed to intrinsic motivation. For example, it is difficult if not impossible to understand how Homo economicus would be a hero in war or would get inherent pleasure from craftsmanship. Frey and others argue that too much emphasis on rewards and punishments can "crowd out" (discourage) intrinsic motivation: paying a boy for doing household tasks may push him from doing those tasks "to help the family" to doing them simply for the reward.

=== Behavioral economists ===
Empirical studies by Amos Tversky questioned the assumption that investors are rational. In 1995, Tversky demonstrated the tendency of investors to make risk-averse choices in gains, and risk-seeking choices in losses. The investors appeared as very risk-averse for small losses but indifferent for a small chance of a very large loss. This violates economic rationality as usually understood. Further research on this subject, showing other deviations from conventionally defined economic rationality, is being done in the growing field of experimental or behavioral economics. Some of the broader issues involved in this criticism are studied in decision theory, of which rational choice theory is only a subset.

Behavioral economists Richard Thaler and Daniel Kahneman have criticized the notion of economic agents possessing stable and well-defined preferences that they consistently act upon in a self-interested manner. Using insights from psychological experiments found explanations for anomalies in economic decision-making that seemed to violate rational choice theory. Writing a column in the Journal of Economic Perspectives under the title Anomalies, Thaler wrote features on the many ways observed economic behavior in markets deviated from theory. One such anomaly was the endowment effect by which individual preferences are framed based on reference positions (Kahneman et al., 1990). In an experiment in which one group was given a mug and the other was asked how much they were willing to pay (WTP) for the mug, it was found that the price that those endowed with the mug where willingness to accept (WTA) greatly exceeded that of the WTP. This was seen as falsifying the Coase theorem in which for every person the WTA equals the WTP that is the basis of the efficient-market hypothesis. From this they argued the endowment effect acts on us by making it painful for us to give up the endowment. Kahneman also argued against the rational-agent model in which agents make decisions with all of the relevant context including weighing all possible future opportunities and risks. Evidence supports the claim that decisions are often made by "narrow framing" with investors making portfolio decisions in isolation from their entire portfolio (Nicholas Barberis et al., 2003). Shlomo Benartzi and Thaler found that investors also tended to use unreasonable time periods in evaluating their investments.

In Kahneman-Tversky’s criticism of the Homo Economicus model, many mainstream economists had utilised deductive logic to further progress the Homo Economicus idea as opposed to Daniel Kahneman and Amos Tversky in which they had applied inductive logic. Further findings of their experiments that opposed Homo Economicus had found that individuals will constantly adjust their choices according to changes in their income and market prices. Furthermore, Kahneman and Tversky had conducted experiments exploring prospect theory where results from several experiments concluded that individuals will generally put higher importance on avoiding loss over making a gain.

=== Sociologists ===
Another weakness is highlighted by economic sociologists, who argue that Homo economicus ignores an extremely important question, i.e. the origins of tastes and the parameters of the utility function by social influences, training, education, and the like. The exogeneity of tastes (preferences) in this model is the major distinction from Homo sociologicus, in which tastes are taken as partially or even totally determined by the societal environment. Comparisons between economics and sociology have resulted in a corresponding term Homo sociologicus, introduced by German sociologist Ralf Dahrendorf in 1958, to parody the image of human nature given in some sociological models that attempt to limit the social forces that determine individual tastes and social values. (The alternative or additional source of these would be biology.) Hirsch et al. say that Homo sociologicus is largely a tabula rasa upon which societies and cultures write values and goals; unlike economicus, sociologicus acts not to pursue selfish interests but to fulfill social roles (though the fulfillment of social roles may have a selfish rationale—e.g. politicians or socialites). This "individual" may appear to be all society and no individual.

The as of 2015 emerging science of "neuroeconomics" suggests that there are serious shortcomings in the conventional theories of economic rationality. Rational economic decision making has been shown to produce high levels of cortisol, epinephrine and corticosteroids, associated with elevated levels of stress. It seems that the dopaminic system is only activated upon achieving the reward, and otherwise the "pain" receptors, particularly in the prefrontal cortex of the left hemisphere of the brain show a high level of activation. Serotonin and oxytocin levels are minimised, and the general immune system shows a level of suppression. Such a pattern is associated with a generalised reduction in the levels of trust. Unsolicited "gift giving", considered irrational from the point of view of Homo economicus, by comparison, shows an elevated stimulation of the pleasure circuits of the whole brain, reduction in the levels of stress, optimal functioning of the immune system, reduction in cortico-steroids and epinephrine and cortisol, activation of the substantia nigra, the striatum and the nucleus accumbens (associated with the placebo effect), all associated with the building of social trust. Mirror neurons result in a win-win positive sum game in which the person giving the gift receives a pleasure equivalent to the person receiving it. This confirms the findings of anthropology which suggest that a "gift economy" preceded the more recent market systems where win-lose or risk-avoidance lose-lose calculations apply.

=== Psychologists and anthropologists ===
Critics, learning from the broadly defined psychoanalytic tradition, criticize the Homo economicus model as ignoring the inner conflicts that real-world individuals suffer, as between short-term and long-term goals (e.g., eating chocolate cake and losing weight) or between individual goals and societal values. Such conflicts may lead to "irrational" behavior involving inconsistency, psychological paralysis, neurosis, and psychic pain. Further irrational human behaviour can occur as a result of habit, laziness, mimicry and simple obedience. According to Sergio Caruso, one should distinguish between the purely "methodological" version of Homo economicus, aimed at practical use in the economic sphere (e.g. economic calculus), and the" anthropological" version, aimed at depicting a certain type of man, or even human nature in general. The former has proved unrealistic, liable to be corrected resorting to economic psychology. Depicting different types of "economic man" (each depending on the social context) is possible with the help of cultural anthropology, and social psychology if only those types are contrived as socially and/or historically determined abstractions (such as Weber's, Korsch's, and Fromm's concepts of Idealtypus, "historical specification", and "social character"). Marxist theoretician Gramsci admitted of the Homo economicus as a useful abstraction on the ground of economic theory, provided that we grant there be as many homines oeconomici as the modes of production. However the concept of Homo economicus puts aside all other aspects of human nature (such as Homo faber, Homo loquens, Homo ludens, Homo reciprocans, and so on).

Amartya Sen has argued there are grave pitfalls in assuming that rationality is limited to selfish rationality. Economics should build into its assumptions the notion that people can give credible commitments to a course of conduct. He demonstrates the absurdity with the narrowness of the assumptions by some economists with the following example of two strangers meeting on a street.

"Where is the railway station?" he asks me. "There," I say, pointing at the post office, "and would you please post this letter for me on the way?" "Yes," he says, determined to open the envelope and check whether it contains something valuable.

=== Feminist Economists ===
Scholarship in feminist economics has also advanced important ideas that are formative to understandings of Homo economicus. Feminist economists Lourdes Benería, Günseli Berik, and Maria S. Floro asserted that mainstream economic systems advance a model of Homo economicus that portrays idealized human behavior as that of a “Rational Economic Man.” Homo economicus assumes that economic preferences and the ability to pursue are universal and predetermined by human nature. According to Sylvia Wynter in Unsettling the Coloniality of Being/Power/Truth/Freedom (2003), “Man” is not a neutral category, but a historically constructed figure rooted in colonial and racial hierarchies. The model of Economic Man reflects a Western, bourgeois ideal of the human, which excludes and devalues those who do not fit this model. As a result, men and women who fall outside this definition along the lines of race, class, and geography are placed as less than fully human within economic systems. Economic Man performs humanity as a productive laborer who is active in the economic market. Economic Man values full-time waged labor as well as buying, selling, or holding financial assets. Other forms of provisioning life remain invisible to this model of the human. According to Nancy Folbre, in her 2001 work on The Invisible Heart, mainstream capitalist economies undervalue the labor of care (like caregiving, domestic work, and community support) because it is often unpaid and excluded from market-based definitions of productivity. Following the model of Economic Man, forms of labor are unrecognized and undervalued by the economy monetarily. These forms of work are historically and disproportionately performed by women, which leads to gendered inequalities in recognition and monetary compensation. Economic Man also constrains men, as their value is tied to productivity in paid labor and economic success, which limits alternative ways of being and contributing, and does not assign value to what does not fit the model’s definition of success. Success can be understood as an able-bodied active worker who is participating and contributing to the economic market, elevating market value and growth. Feminist economists have also argued that Homo economicus fails to account for the social and cultural conditions that shape women’s economic choices, such as care and responsibility for the family. They argue that multiple dimensions, such as love, compassion, altruism, and empathy, influence human decisions and desires, not just the flows of supply and demand. The argument follows that Economic Man overlooks and devalues women's labor because it fails to recognize or value reproductive, care, and household labor. Because economic productivity measures fail to account for reproductive labor, they are partial and ineffective. Thus, scholars like Benería, Berik, and Floro advocated for replacing the mainstream economic model with one based on social provisioning, shifting the economic focus away from profit maximization and towards improving well-being, sustainability, and equity. Mary Mellor, an ecofeminist economist, critiques the Homo economicus in many of her works, such as Women, Nature and the Social Construction of ‘Economic Man’ (1997) and Ecofeminist Political Economy: a green and feminist agenda (2017). Her argument claims that Homo economicus is a product of Western hierarchical dualisms that associate the economic sphere with men, deeming women’s labor and natural capital as inferior and unvalued. She claims that the Homo economicus is unrealistic and unsustainable, critiquing its focus on profit and androcentric premises as a harmful basis for economic models. ‘He’ (Homo economicus) is disembedded from nature: unconcerned by ecological limits or environmental destruction unless the economy is impacted. Mellor asserts that ecosystem services and natural resources are devalued here, thereby allowing degradation and exploitation to be treated as mere externalities. She contends that Homo economicus is disembodied: not limited by the human body and life cycle or by the products and processes (care work) required to sustain them. These products and processes appear to 'him’ only as commodities and conveniences to be traded in the market. ‘He’ is unburdened of domestic, non-market responsibilities, typically performed by women. She argues that these labor burdens fall on women, but the value of this labor is not recognized in the market, thereby rendering it invisible and undervalued. Mellor critiques the Homo economicus model’s inability to recognize the value of ecosystems and women’s work, which the market relies upon to function. Mellor also emphasized that, in the same way Economic Man is detached from biological life (ignoring biological needs and realities), it is disembedded from ecological systems. Being disembedded from ecological systems means unlimited consumption, drawing from resources from around the world, and disregarding ecological limits and externalities. Ecological destruction and resource degradation are not a concern to Economic Man and the economy, unless it can be sold. Toxicity and pollution become an issue only when there are economic impacts. This leads to the exploitation of natural systems such as clean drinking water, forests that sequester carbon, and biodiversity amongst species, which are necessary in the long term to sustain human life on Earth. Mellor, Folbre, and Wynter show that Economic Man is harmful because it ignores care, ecology, and enforces a limited, exclusionary definition of value, success, and what it means to be human. Economic man harms women through the devaluation of domestic labor and caregiving and harms men through the restriction of identity to economic productivity, while excluding and devaluing all those who do not fit into its narrow model.

=== Response to criticism ===
In advanced-level theoretical economics, scholars have modified models to more realistically depict real-life decision-making. For example, models of individual behavior under bounded rationality and of people suffering from envy can be found in the literature.

== See also ==
- Agent (economics)
- Consumer confusion
- Homo duplex
- Homo Sovieticus
- Post-autistic economics
- Rational agent
- Rational choice theory
- Rational pricing
- Superrationality
- Bounded rationality
- Rationality and power
- List of alternative names for the human species
