= Louis Dumont =

French anthropologist

- Born: Louis Charles Jean Dumont; 11 August 1911; Thessaloniki, Salonica, Ottoman Empire
- Died: 19 November 1998 (aged 87); Paris, Ile-de-France, France
- Education: University of Paris
- Employer(s): Oxford University, École des Hautes Études en Sciences Sociales
- Notable work: Homo Hierarchicus
- Spouse: Suzanne Tardieu

Louis Charles Jean Dumont (French: [dymɔ̃] 11 August 1911 – 19 November 1998) was a French anthropologist.

== Life ==
Dumont was born in Thessaloniki, in the Salonica Vilayet of the Ottoman Empire. He taught at Oxford University during the 1950s, and was then director of the École des Hautes Études en Sciences Sociales (EHESS) in Paris. A specialist on the cultures and societies of India, Dumont also studied western social philosophy and ideologies. He cited Claude Lévi-Strauss as his inspiration. His contributions on the caste system and kinship in context of South India are one of the first forays in the field.

Dumont died in 1998, aged 87, in Paris.

== Works ==
His works include Homo Hierarchicus: Essai sur le système des castes (1966), From Mandeville to Marx: The Genesis and Triumph of Economic Ideology (1977) and Essais sur l'individualisme: Une perspective anthropologique sur l'idéologie moderne (1983), in which he contrasts holism with individualism.

== See also ==
- Alliance theory
- Claude Lévi-Strauss

== Sources ==
- Good, Anthony (5 December 1998). "Obituary: Professor Louis Dumont". The Independent.
- Beteille, Andre (9 January 1999). "Obituary: Louis Dumont (1911-1998)" (PDF). Economic & Political Weekly.
- Celtel, André (December 2004). Categories of Self: Louis Dumont's Theory of the Individual. Berghahn Books, New York, Oxford.
