= Choice theory =

Choice theory may refer to:

- Rational choice theory, the mainstream choice theory in economics, and the "heart" of microeconomics
  - non-standard theories are in their infancy and mostly the subject of behavioral economics
- Social choice theory, a conglomerate of models and results concerning the aggregation of individual choices into collective choices
- Glasser's choice theory, a psychological theory used in some brands of counseling
