= Homo Hierarchicus =

1966 book by Louis Dumont

Homo Hierarchicus: Essai sur le système des castes (1966) is a work of social anthropology by Louis Dumont, devoted to the analysis of the Indian caste system. It analyses the caste hierarchy and the ascendancy tendency of the lower castes to follow the habits of the higher castes. This concept was termed as Sanskritisation by M. N. Srinivas.

He states that the ideology of caste system is fundamentally contrary to our idea of egalitarian society and arises from the nature, conditions and limitations of realisation of such a society. We can not restrict ourselves to understand caste system only as a form of 'social stratification'.

== See also ==
- Names for the human species
