= Newcomb's problem =

Thought experiment

View of boxes in Newcomb's problem

In philosophy and mathematics, Newcomb's problem, also known as Newcomb's paradox, is a thought experiment posing a decision problem in which a player must decide whether to choose one of two or both boxes under conditions in which a being, often called the "predictor", decides in advance what they contain, and is able to predict the player's choices with near-certainty.

Newcomb's paradox was created by William Newcomb of the University of California's Lawrence Livermore Laboratory. It was first analyzed in a philosophy paper by Robert Nozick in 1969 and appeared in the March 1974 issue of Scientific American, in Martin Gardner's "Mathematical Games". Today it is a much debated problem in the philosophical branch of decision theory.

== Definition ==
Predicted choice Actual choice	A + B (B has $0)	B (B has $1,000,000)
A + B	$1,000	$1,001,000
B	$0	$1,000,000

In the standard version of Newcomb's problem, two boxes are designated A and B. The player is given a choice between taking only box B or taking both boxes A and B. The player knows the following:

- Box A is transparent, or open, and always contains a visible $1,000.
- Box B is opaque, or closed, and its content has already been set by the predictor:
  - If the predictor has predicted that the player will take both boxes A and B, then box B contains nothing.
  - If the predictor has predicted that the player will take only box B, then box B contains $1,000,000.

The player does not know what the predictor predicted or what box B contains while making the choice.

=== Limit case ===
Predicted choice Actual choice	A + B	B
A + B	$1,000	Impossible
B	Impossible	$1,000,000

The limit case of Newcomb's problem is defined the predictor being not only extremely reliable but actually infallible. Many solutions focus on the limit case, especially as there can seem to be no decision-relevant difference between extremely high probability and certainty. However, Nozick defended one-boxing in the limit case and two-boxing in other cases.

=== Relationship to game theory ===
Some treatments of Newcomb's problem attempt to interpret it in terms of game theory, with the predictor interpreted as a second player. However, the problem does not qualify as a game in the sense defined by game theory, since the predictor's choice is probabilistically dependent on the player's choice, and the predictor has no preference order over the possible outcomes.

== Strategies ==
In his 1969 article, Nozick noted that "To almost everyone, it is perfectly clear and obvious what should be done. The difficulty is that these people seem to divide almost evenly on the problem, with large numbers thinking that the opposing half is just being silly." The problem continues to divide philosophers today. In a 2020 survey, a modest plurality of professional philosophers chose to take both boxes (39.0% versus 31.2%).

Decision theory offers two strategies for this game that rely on different principles: the expected utility principle and the strategic dominance principle. The problem is sometimes considered a paradox (although this classification is disputed) because two seemingly logical analyses yield conflicting answers regarding which choice maximizes the player's payout.

- Expected utility: Due to the high accuracy of the predictor, it can seem that it is not realistically open to the player (or in the limit case, open at all to the player) to make a choice that the predictor did not predict. Considering the expected utility in such conditions, the player should choose to take only box B. This choice, called one-boxing, statistically maximizes the player's winnings, resulting in approximately $1,000,000 per game. (This argument from expected utility was given by Nozick and echoed by other "one-boxers" such as Horgan, but Huemer believes that a correct interpretation of expected-utility maximization would support two-boxing.)
- Strategic dominance: Since the predictor has already made its prediction, it can seem that choosing both boxes A and B will always yield $1,000 more than only choosing B, and that if this turns out to equal exactly $1,000, then the option of getting a million from box B was simply not open to the player. Under the strategic dominance principle, the player should then choose the strategy that is always better, and take both boxes (two-boxing).

David Wolpert and Gregory Benford point out that paradoxes arise when not all relevant details of a problem are specified, and there is more than one "intuitively obvious" way to fill in those missing details. They suggest that, in Newcomb's paradox, the debate over which strategy is "obviously correct" stems from the fact that interpreting the problem details differently can lead to two distinct noncooperative games. Each strategy is optimal for one interpretation of the game but not the other. They then derive the optimal strategies for both of the games, which turn out to be independent of the predictor's infallibility, questions of causality, determinism, and free will. A similar analysis of different interpretations of the problem is given in § Interpretations below.

Newcomb's problem has been used as an argument against causal decision theory, on the premise that causal decision theory supports taking both boxes in Newcomb's problem, but taking only one box is the superior choice (on expected-utility grounds). Caspar Oesterheld and Vincent Conitzer, for instance, have argued against the use of causal decision theory when applied to Newcomb's paradox. They argue that there exist multiple scenarios where the use of causal decision theory causes the agent to voluntarily lose money, and that causal decision theorists are subject to diachronic Dutch books.

== Interpretations ==
Different interpretations as to why the predictor is so accurate yield different rational solutions to the problem. Some such interpretations are illustrated in this section with diagrams in a convention similar to Mackie's 1977 paper "Newcomb's Paradox and the Direction of Causation", using white squares for events whose outcome is "open" to the player's rational deliberation, black squares for events whose outcome is not open to deliberation, and arrows for causal connections. In the diagrams, references to a choice being "free" refer to the choice being open to influence by decision-theoretical reasoning about the rational choice in the decision problem, not necessarily in some broader "free will" sense, although some cited authors have discussed such broader conceptions.

=== Causal connection ===
Cases where it is reasonable to take only the closed box

If (a) the predictor is always putting $1,000,000 in the opaque box and then using a hidden trapdoor to remove it if the player goes for the transparent box, it is reasonable to one-box. Similarly, if retrocausality (backwards causation) is possible (b), or if (c) the problem situation is played multiple times so that the predictor learns from the player's behavior in one round of play to make his prediction for the next round, it is clearly reasonable to one-box. In cases (a)–(c), there is a causal connection between two-boxing and losing the million, so there is no controversy. Variants of the retrocausality include that the current post-determination premise may be merely a lie or illusion; it may in fact be the test that is used to determine the contents.

William Lane Craig has suggested that, in a world with perfect predictors (or time machines, because a time machine could be used as a mechanism for making a prediction), retrocausality can occur. The chooser's choice can be said to have caused the predictor's prediction. Some have concluded that if time machines or perfect predictors can exist, then there can be no free will and choosers will do whatever they are fated to do. Taken together, the paradox is a restatement of the old contention that free will and determinism are incompatible, since determinism enables the existence of perfect predictors. Put another way, this paradox can be equivalent to the grandfather paradox; the paradox presupposes a perfect predictor, implying the "chooser" is not free to choose, yet simultaneously presumes a choice can be debated and decided. This suggests to some that the paradox is an artifact of these contradictory assumptions.

Cases where two-boxing would be reasonable if one were free

If the predictor is posited as infallible and incapable of error, it can seem that it is impossible for there to be a true answer as to what it is most reasonable to choose, as there is no true choice, and the player's decision is predetermined by the psychological facts surveyed by the predictor. For instance, if the predictor has such an accurate track record because (f) he is a capable hypnotist who manipulates all choosers to one-box or two-box in accordance with whether he chose to put the money in the opaque box, then it would be reasonable to two-box if one could, but by construction, one is not free to. Similarly, if the predictor has an infallibly correct psychology (g), then the player's choice cannot be determined by a strategist's recommendation of what is most reasonable to do, as it is fixed in advance by his psychological character. Any solution then becomes moot. Nozick avoids this issue by positing that the predictor's predictions are "almost certainly" correct, thus sidestepping any issues of infallibility and causality. Nozick also stipulates that if the predictor predicts that the player will choose randomly, then box B will contain nothing. This assumes that inherently random or unpredictable events would not come into play anyway during the process of making the choice, such as free will or quantum mind processes.

This interpretation of Newcomb's paradox is related to logical fatalism in that they both suppose absolute certainty of the future. In logical fatalism, this assumption of certainty creates circular reasoning ("a future event is certain to happen, therefore it is certain to happen"), while Newcomb's paradox considers whether the participants of its game are able to affect a predestined outcome.

=== Character formation ===
Cases where it is reasonable to develop a specific character

However, the problem can be thought of as a situation (d) where, although the predictor is infallible, the player is free to develop their own character at some point ahead of the problem situation so as to determine what the predictor will predict. Under this condition, it seems that taking only B is the correct option. This analysis argues that we can ignore the possibilities that return $0 and $1,001,000, as they both require that the predictor has made an incorrect prediction, and the problem states that the predictor is never wrong. Thus, the choice becomes whether to take both boxes with $1,000 or to take only box B with $1,000,000 – so taking only box B is always better. An example of this interpretation is Gary Drescher, who argues in his book Good and Real that the correct decision is to take only box B, by appealing to a situation he argues is analogous – a rational agent in a deterministic universe deciding whether or not to cross a potentially busy street. Such a rational agent chooses to cross only if their reasoning process indicates it is safe, because the kind of decision procedure they run tends to correlate with situations where crossing is safe—even in a deterministic universe where their choice does not causally change the traffic. Alternatively, however, if (e) the predictor can be systematically fooled, then the player should determine their character so as to always fool the predictor. As Mackie says, "the best character of all to develop, if it were possible, is one which would fool these psychologist-seers — the player should appear to be a closed-box-only-taker, and should perhaps start by intending to take the closed box only, but then change his mind at the last minute and take both boxes; if the game is to be played repeatedly, he must appear at the start of each new game to be a reformed character who, despite his former lapses, will take only the closed box this time, and yet he must in the end yield to temptation again and take both boxes after all."

Simon Burgess has argued that the problem can be divided into two stages: the stage before the predictor has gained all the information on which the prediction will be based and the stage after it. While the player is still in the first stage, they are presumably able to influence the predictor's prediction, for example, by committing to taking only one box. So players who are still in the first stage should simply commit themselves to one-boxing. Burgess readily acknowledges that those who are in the second stage should take both boxes. As he emphasises, however, for all practical purposes that is beside the point; the decisions "that determine what happens to the vast bulk of the money on offer all occur in the first [stage]". So players who find themselves in the second stage without having already committed to one-boxing will invariably end up without the riches and without anyone else to blame. In Burgess's words: "you've been a bad boy scout"; "the riches are reserved for those who are prepared".

Burgess has stressed that – pace certain critics (e.g., Peter Slezak) – he does not recommend that players try to trick the predictor. Nor does he assume that the predictor is unable to predict the player's thought process in the second stage. Quite to the contrary, Burgess analyses Newcomb's paradox as a common cause problem, and he pays special attention to the importance of adopting a set of unconditional probability values – whether implicitly or explicitly – that are entirely consistent at all times. To treat the paradox as a common cause problem is simply to assume that the player's decision and the predictor's prediction have a common cause. (That common cause may be, for example, the player's brain state at some particular time before the second stage begins.)

Burgess highlights a similarity between Newcomb's paradox and the Kavka's toxin puzzle. Recognition of the similarity, however, is something that Burgess credits to Andy Egan. In both problems one can have a reason to intend to do something without having a reason to actually do it. Similarly, both problems may ask whether it is possible to truly intend or commit to do something and later on still choose not to do so. An answer to this by Gibbard & Harper is that, if given the opportunity beforehand, the rational agent should adopt the disposition to take only the opaque box, and this disposition must be stable, that is, the agent should actually one-box at the moment of choice, not merely beforehand.

=== No connection at all ===
Cases where one is free to take both boxes, and it is reasonable to do so

Finally, it is possible to suppose that the predictor's past accuracy came from other factors which are now causally unconnected with the player's move, such as (h) very lucky sheer coincidence, or (i) a form of hypnosis which the player is able, in some rare cases, to break free from, or (j) a form of highly correct psychology which nevertheless it is possible, in some rare cases, to fool. The indeterminacy of such a causal connection is signified by a dashed arrow. In those situations, it is reasonable to make the two-boxing choice, but simply much more difficult to do so when there is money in the opaque box.

== Analogies and extensions ==
Andrew Irvine argues that the problem is structurally isomorphic to Braess's paradox, a non-intuitive but ultimately non-paradoxical result concerning equilibrium points in physical systems of various kinds.

Newcomb's paradox can also be related to the question of machine consciousness, specifically if a perfect simulation of a person's brain will generate the consciousness of that person. Suppose we take the predictor to be a machine that arrives at its prediction by simulating the brain of the chooser when confronted with the problem of which box to choose. If that simulation generates the consciousness of the chooser, then the chooser cannot tell whether they are standing in front of the boxes in the real world or in the virtual world generated by the simulation in the past. The "virtual" chooser would thus tell the predictor which choice the "real" chooser is going to make, and the chooser, not knowing whether they are the real chooser or the simulation, should take only the second box.

A quantum-theoretical version of Newcomb's problem, in which box B is entangled with box A has been proposed. This gives yet another interpretation to the reliability of the predictor. Due to ongoing debates on the correct interpretation of quantum mechanics, it is not settled whether this counts as a § Causal connection.

Nick Bostrom has proposed an extension of Newcomb's problem, called the meta-Newcomb problem. The setup of this problem is similar to the original Newcomb problem. However, the twist here is that the predictor may elect to decide whether to fill box B after the player has made a choice, and the player does not know whether box B has already been filled. There is also another predictor: a "meta-predictor" who has reliably predicted both the players and the predictor in the past, and who predicts the following: "Either you will choose both boxes, and the predictor will make its decision after you, or you will choose only box B, and the predictor will already have made its decision." In this situation, a proponent of choosing both boxes is faced with the following dilemma: if the player chooses both boxes, the predictor will not yet have made its decision, and therefore a more rational choice would be for the player to choose box B only. But if the player so chooses, the predictor will already have made its decision, making it impossible for the player's decision to affect the predictor's decision.

In the late 1950s, R. A. Fisher proposed an analogy between Newcomb's problem and the rationality of smoking under the (now known to be false) supposition that smoking does not cause cancer but rather, a so-called "smoker's lesion" is probabilistically connected with both smoking and cancer. In what is called the "tickle defense", the real-life relevance of this analogy is disputed by noting that the causal mechanism for such a lesion would have to work by increasing the player's expected utility if they were to smoke. If so, the player must know whether he has the lesion as long as he knows the payoff-matrix parameters to make a rational choice regarding the problem—and if he does not know these parameters, then he is not facing a decision problem at all. Nevertheless, such medical analogies are still often considered "realistic versions" of Newcomb's problem.

== See also ==
- Causal decision theory
- Evidential decision theory
- Focal point (game theory)
- Unexpected hanging paradox
