= Homo faber =

Humankind as creator of artificial things

Homo faber (Latin for 'Man the Maker') alludes to the idea that human beings are able to control their fate and their environment as a result of the use of tools.

== Original phrase ==
In Latin literature, Appius Claudius Caecus uses this term in his Sententiæ, referring to the ability of man to control his destiny and what surrounds him: Homo faber suae quisque fortunae ("Every man is the artifex of his destiny").

== Modern usage ==
The classic homo faber suae quisque fortunae was "rediscovered" by humanists in the 14th century and was central in the Italian Renaissance.

In the 20th century, Max Scheler and Hannah Arendt made the philosophical concept central again.

In anthropological discussions, Homo faber, as the "working man", is confronted with Homo ludens, the "playing man", who is concerned with amusements, humor, and leisure. It is also used in George Kubler's book, The Shape of Time as a reference to individuals who create works of art.

Henri Bergson also referred to the concept in Creative Evolution (1907), defining intelligence, in its original sense, as the "faculty to create artificial objects, in particular tools to make tools, and to indefinitely variate its makings."

Homo Faber is the title of an influential novel by the Swiss author Max Frisch, published in 1957.

== See also ==
- List of alternative names for the human species
- Artificiality
