= James M. Joyce =

American philosopher and academic

James Michael Joyce (born 1958) is a philosopher professor at the University of Michigan. He specializes in the philosophy of probability.

== Education and career ==
Joyce received a Bachelor of Arts in philosophy and in mathematics at John Carroll University in 1980. He taught as an adjunct professor of philosophy at the University of the District of Columbia from 1987 to 1990. He received a Doctor of Philosophy in philosophy from the University of Michigan in 1991.

He joined Michigan's philosophy department there as an assistant professor after receiving his doctorate. He was promoted to full professor in 2006 and awarded the title of C. H. Langford Collegiate Professor in 2012. He was elected a member of the American Academy of Arts and Sciences in 2024. The American Philosophical Association selected him to give the 2026 John Dewey Lecture for its central division.

On July 16, 2026, the Regents of the University of Michigan approved the appointment of Joyce as the Allan F. Gibbard Distinguished University Professor of Philosophy, effective September 1, 2026.

== Selected publications ==
- Joyce, J. M. (1999). The Foundations of Causal Decision Theory. Cambridge University Press. doi:10.1017/CBO9780511498497. ISBN 978-0-521-64164-7.
- Joyce, J. M. (September 30, 2003). "Bayes' Theorem". In Zalta, Edward N. (ed.). Stanford Encyclopedia of Philosophy (Fall 2003 ed.). ISSN 1095-5054. OCLC 429049174.
- Joyce, J. M. (2011). "Kullback–Leibler Divergence". International Encyclopedia of Statistical Science. Springer. pp. 720–722. doi:10.1007/978-3-642-04898-2_327. ISBN 978-3-642-04897-5.
