= Nowak =

Nowak ([ˈnɔvak] NOH-vak) is a Polish surname derived from the nickname literally meaning 'novice, newcomer, rookie'. Early records of the surname are dated by the 14th century. It is a gender-neutral surname, with archaic feminine forms Nowakowa (by husband) and Nowakówna, Nowaczanka (by father). Colloquial forms by husband include Nowakówka, Nowaczka, Nowaczonka. In Silesia the variant Nowok is known. Emigrees may acquire forms Nowack, Novak, Novack. German sources indicate that it is also a Sorbian surname. As of 2026 it is the most common surname in Poland, keeping the first place for many years. In 2021 it was the surname of 102,503 women and 100,617 men For example, in 2009 it was the top one, with 100,836 men and 106,512 women. In January 2026, the Polish register PESEL listed 99,738 women and 98,387 men with the surname.

In Poland, it may also appear as a result of migration of Czech and Slovak people with surname Novak of the same etymology. On the other hand, in Germany the opposite change of the surname could have happened: from "Novak" to "Nowak".

Notable people with the surname include:

- Amram Nowak (1925–2005), American film producer, film director and writer
- Andreas Nowak (born 1975), German politician
- Andrzej Nowak (guitarist) (born 1959), Polish guitar player with TSA
- Andrzej Nowak (historian) (born 1960), Polish historian and professor at Jagiellonian University
- Andrzej Nowak (ice hockey) (1956–2013), Polish ice hockey player
- Andrzej Nowak (mathematician) (born 1952) Polish mathematician and professor
- Andrzej Nowak (psychologist) (born 1953), Polish psychologist and professor
- Anton Nowak (1865–1932), Austrian artist
- Bartosz Nowak, Polish footballer
- Cécile Nowak (born 1967), French judoka
- Ewa Nowak (born 1966), Polish writer
- Halina Nowak-Guńka (born 1970), Polish skier and biathlete
- Henry Nowak, (died 2025) murdered British student
- Hank Nowak (born 1950), Canadian ice hockey player
- Henry J. Nowak (1935–2024), American politician
- Henry Nowak (musician), American musician, member of the band Britny Fox
- Jan Nowak-Jeziorański (1914–2005), Polish journalist and World War II hero
- Jerzy Nowak, Polish actor
- Jerzy Robert Nowak, Polish historian
- Józef Nowak (1925–1984), Polish actor
- Julian Nowak (1865–1946), Polish physician, veterinarian, bacteriologist, and politician
- Katarzyna Nowak, Polish tennis player
- Kazimierz Nowak (1897–1937), Polish traveler
- Krysia Nowak (born 1948), British artist
- Leo Nowak (artist) (1907–2001), American illustrator
- Leo Nowak (bishop) (1929–2026), German Roman Catholic bishop
- Leopold Nowak (1904–1991), Austrian musicologist
- Lisa Nowak (born 1963), American astronaut
- Łukasz Nowak (born 1988), Polish athlete
- Marco Nowak, German ice hockey player
- Mark Nowak (born 1964), American poet and writer
- Manfred Nowak (born 1950), United Nations Special Rapporteur on Torture
- Martin Nowak (born 1965), Austrian mathematical biologist
- Mateusz Nowak, Polish cyclist
- Oskar Nowak (1913–1989), Austrian ice hockey player
- Paweł Nowak (born 1979), Polish footballer
- Piotr Nowak (born 1964), Polish footballer and manager
- Sylwia Nowak, Polish ice dancer
- Tadeusz Nowak, Polish footballer
- Teresa Nowak (1942–2024), Polish athlete
- Tim Nowak, German decathlete
- Wanda Nowak (1913–?), Austrian athlete
- Zdzisław Nowak (1906–1996), Polish athlete
- Zenon Nowak (1905–1980), Polish trade union activist and politician

== Fictional characters ==
- Tom Nowak, in the movie Inquest of Pilot Pirx
- Tommy Nowak, in the movie Pink Cadillac, played by Clint Eastwood
- Nowak, character on manga Orb: On the Movements of the Earth
