= Andrzej Nowak =

Andrzej Nowak may refer to:

- Andrzej Nowak (guitarist) (born 1959), Polish guitar player with TSA
- Andrzej Nowak (historian) (born 1960), Polish historian and professor at Jagiellonian University
- Andrzej Nowak (ice hockey) (1956–2013), Polish ice hockey player
- Andrzej Nowak (mathematician) (born 1952) Polish mathematician and professor
- Andrzej Nowak (psychologist) (born 1953), Polish psychologist and professor
