= International Society of Dynamic Games =

- Abbreviation: ISDG
- Formation: 1990
- Type: INGO
- Location: Helsinki, Finland
- Region served: Worldwide
- Official language: English, French
- President: Florian Wagener
- Website: ISDG Official website; Twetter

The International Society of Dynamic Games (ISDG) is an international non-profit, professional organization for the advancement of the theory of dynamic games.

== History ==
The ISDG was founded on August 9, 1990, in Helsinki, Finland, at the site of the 4th International Symposium on Dynamic Games and Applications in the Helsinki University of Technology. ISDG is governed by an executive board chaired by a president. The first president of the society was professor Tamer Başar. In past years the presidents of ISDG were

- Tamer Başar 1990–1994
- Alain Haurie 1994–1998
- Pierre Bernhard 1998–2002
- Georges Zaccour 2002–2006
- Geert Jan Olsder 2006–2008
- Leon Petrosyan 2008–2012
- Michèle Breton 2012–2016
- Vladimir Mazalov 2016–2022
- Florian Wagener 2022-

== The objectives of ISDG ==
- to promote and foster the development and applications of the theory of dynamic games.
- to disseminate scientific information through all conveniently adopted support services. ISDG achieves these goals by organizing or co-organizing symposia, conferences and workshops and publishing distinguished high-standard journals
- to establish links with the international scientific community and in particular with other societies dealing with game theory, optimization, decision analysis and dynamical systems.

== ISDG publications ==
- Annals of the International Society of Dynamic Games (series ed.: Tamer Başar; published by Birkhäuser)
- Dynamic Games and Applications (editor-in-chief: Georges Zaccour; published by Birkhäuser)
- International Game Theory Review (managing editor: David W. K. Yeung, editors: Hans Peters, Leon A. Petrosyan; published by World Scientific Publishing Co. Pte. Ltd.)

== Isaacs Award ==
The Executive Committee of the International Society of Dynamic Games (ISDG) decided in 2003 to establish a prestigious prize to honor "outstanding contributions to the theory and applications of dynamic games." This prize is awarded to two distinguished scholars at each ISDG symposium, beginning with the 2004 edition. The award is named after Rufus Isaacs., widely recognized as the founding father of differential games, whose pioneering work laid the foundation for modern dynamic game theory.

Rufus Isaacs' groundbreaking contributions, particularly his 1965 book "Differential Games," established core principles and methodologies that have profoundly influenced the field. The prize serves to celebrate and promote excellence in dynamic games research, encompassing a broad spectrum of areas, including differential games, stochastic games, evolutionary games, and their applications in economics, engineering, biology, and other domains. By awarding this prize, the ISDG aims to recognize scholars whose work has significantly advanced both theoretical understanding and practical applications of dynamic games, furthering Isaacs' legacy.The recipients of this prize are:

- 2004: Yu-Chi Ho & George Leitmann
- 2006: Nikolay Krasovskii & Wendell Fleming
- 2008: Pierre Bernhard & Alain Haurie
- 2010: Tamer Başar & Geert Jan Olsder
- 2012: Steffen Jørgensen & Karl Sigmund
- 2014: Eitan Altman & Leon Petrosyan
- 2016: Martino Bardi & Ross Cressman
- 2018: Andrzej S. Nowak & Georges Zaccour
- 2022: Pierre Cardaliaguet & Mabel Tidball
- 2024: Joel Brown & Roland Malhamé
- 2026: Gerhard Sorger & Sylvain Sorin

== Tom Vincent Award ==
The Tom Vincent Award was established in 2019 to honor contributors in the field of evolutionary game theory. The prize is named after Thomas L. Vincent.

=== 2022 laureates ===
- Alan Scaramangas, Mark Broom, Graeme D. Ruxton, and Anna Rouviere
- Maria Kleshnina, Christian Hilbe, Štěpán Šimsa, Krishnendu Chatterjee, and Martin A. Nowak

=== 2024 laureates ===
- Krzysztof Argasinski and Ryszard Rudnicki

=== 2026 laureates ===
- Solaleh Mohammadi, Xiang Gao, and Kaiqing Zhang

== Other Awards ==
The Executive Committee of the International Society of Dynamic Games on the meeting during the 18th ISDG Symposium established an award for the best paper prize presented by a young scholar at the Symposium (named after Nikolay Krasovskii)) and at the 21st ISDG Symposium decided to establish a prize to promote research in the field of dynamic game theory, excluding evolutionary games (named after Tamer Başar and Geert-Jan Olsder).

=== Krasovskii Young Scholar Award ===
The recipients of this prize are:

- David Evangelista (2018)
- Hicham Kouhkouh (2022)
- Mohammadreza Satouri (2024)
- Kailas Shankar Honasoge (2026)

=== Başar–Olsder Award ===
The recipient of this prize is:

♣ Diogo Gomes and Melih Üçer(2026)
