= Rufus Isaacs (game theorist) =

American game theorist (1914–1981)

- Born: June 11, 1914; New York City, U.S.
- Died: January 18, 1981 (aged 66); Baltimore, Maryland, U.S.
- Education: MIT; Columbia University
- Known for: Differential games
- Scientific career
- Workplaces: Carrier Corporation; RAND Corporation; Lockheed Aircraft Company; Hughes Aircraft Company; Institute for Defense Analyses; CNA; Johns Hopkins University
- Thesis: A finite difference function theory (1942)
- Doctoral advisor: Edward Kasner

Rufus Philip Isaacs (June 11, 1914 – January 18, 1981) was an American game theorist especially prominent in the 1950s and 1960s with his work on differential games. His work in pure mathematics included working with monodiffric functions, fractional-order mappings, graph theory, analytic functions, and number theory. In graph theory he constructed the first two infinite families of snarks. In applied mathematics, he worked with aerodynamics, elasticity, optimization.

== Biography ==
Isaacs was born in New York City and attended the Franklin School. He studied at Massachusetts Institute of Technology from 1932 to 1936 and obtained a bachelor degree in general engineering. He worked for two years at the Carrier Corporation in Syracuse, New York before going to graduate school at Columbia University. He received his MA and PhD in mathematics from Columbia University in 1940 and 1943 respectively. After Columbia, Isaacs briefly worked at the University of Notre Dame as an assistant for Karl Menger but he left in 1947 due to salary issues.

Isaacs then joined RAND Corporation from 1948 until winter 1954/1955. His investigation stemmed from classic pursuit–evasion type zero-sum dynamic two-player games such as the Princess and monster game. In 1942, he married Rose Bicov, and they had two daughters. While at RAND, much of his work was classified, and thus remained unknown until the publication of his classic text on differential games a decade after leaving RAND. His career after RAND was spent largely in the defense and avionics industries. While at RAND, he worked with researchers including Richard E. Bellman, Leonard D. Berkovitz, David H. Blackwell, John M. Danskin, Melvin Dresher, Wendell H. Fleming, Irving L. Glicksberg, Oliver A. Gross, Samuel Karlin, John W. Milnor, John F. Nash, and Lloyd S. Shapley. His work has significant influence on mathematical optimization including fundamental concepts such as dynamic programming (Richard E. Bellman) and the Pontryagin maximum principle (Breitner 2005) which are widely used in economics and many other fields.

Upon departing RAND, Isaacs worked subsequently for Lockheed Aircraft Company from 1955 to 1956, and for Hughes Aircraft Company from 1956 to 1958. From 1958 to 1962, he was at the Institute for Defense Analyses. He returned to academia in 1967, when he became a professor of Mathematical Sciences and Electrical Engineering at the Johns Hopkins University and worked there until his retirement in 1977.

== Selected work(s) ==
- Isaacs, Rufus (1965). Differential Games: A Mathematical Theory with Applications to Warfare and Pursuit, Control and Optimization. Wiley. ISBN 978-0-471-42860-2.
- Isaacs, Rufus (1969). "Differential games: Their scope, nature, and future". Journal of Optimization Theory and Applications. 3 (5): 283–295. doi:10.1007/BF00931368. ISSN 0022-3239.

== The Isaacs Award ==
The executive board of the International Society of Dynamic Games decided in 2003 to establish a prize to recognize the "outstanding contribution to the theory and applications of dynamic games" of two scholars at each of its symposium, starting in 2004. The prize was named after Isaacs.

The recipients of this prize are:

- Yu-Chi Ho and George Leitmann (2004)
- Nikolay Krasovskii and Wendell Fleming (2006)
- Pierre Bernhard and Alain Haurie (2008)
- Tamer Başar and Geert Jan Olsder (2010)
- Steffen Jørgensen and Karl Sigmund (2012)
- Eitan Altman and Leon Petrosyan (2014)
- Martino Bardi and Ross Cressman (2016)
- Andrzej Nowak and Georges Zaccour (2018)
- Pierre Cardaliaguet & Mabel Tidball (2022)
- Joel Brown & Roland Malhamé (2024)
- Gerhard Sorger & Sylvain Sorin (2026)

== See also ==
- Pursuit–evasion games
- Princess and Monster game
- Search games
