= Homicidal chauffeur problem =

Mathematical pursuit problem

In game theory, the homicidal chauffeur problem is a mathematical pursuit problem which pits a hypothetical runner, who can only move slowly, but is highly maneuverable, against the driver of a motor vehicle, which is much faster but far less maneuverable, who is attempting to run him down. Both runner and driver are assumed to never tire. The question to be solved is: under what circumstances, and with what strategy, can the driver of the car guarantee that he can always catch the pedestrian, or the pedestrian guarantee that he can indefinitely elude the car?

The problem is often used as an unclassified proxy for missile defense and other military targeting, allowing scientists to publish on it without security implications.

The problem was proposed by Rufus Isaacs in a 1951 report for the RAND Corporation, and in the book Differential Games.

The homicidal chauffeur problem is a classic example of a differential game played in continuous time in a continuous state space. The calculus of variations and level set methods can be used as a mathematical framework for investigating solutions of the problem. Although the problem is phrased as a recreational problem, it is an important model problem for mathematics used in a number of real-world applications.

A discrete version of the problem was described by Martin Gardner (in his book Mathematical Carnival, chapter 16), where a squad car of speed 2 chases a crook of speed 1 on a rectangular grid, where the squad car but not the crook is constrained not to make left-hand turns or U-turns.

== See also ==
- Variational calculus
- Level-set method
- Apollonius pursuit problem
- Conway's angel problem, another mathematical game which pits a powerful and maneuverable adversary against a highly resourceful but less powerful foe
- Princess and monster game
