= Evolutionary graph theory =

Approach to studying how topology affects evolution of a population

Evolutionary graph theory is an area of research lying at the intersection of graph theory, probability theory, and mathematical biology. Evolutionary graph theory is an approach to studying how topology affects evolution of a population. That the underlying topology can substantially affect the results of the evolutionary process is seen most clearly in a paper by Erez Lieberman, Christoph Hauert and Martin Nowak.

== Mathematical framework ==
In evolutionary graph theory, individuals occupy vertices of a weighted directed graph and the weight w_{i j} of an edge from vertex i to vertex j denotes the probability of i replacing j. The weight corresponds to the biological notion of fitness where fitter types propagate more readily.

One property studied on graphs with two types of individuals is the fixation probability, which is defined as the probability that a single, randomly placed mutant of type A will replace a population of type B. According to the isothermal theorem, a graph has the same fixation probability as the corresponding Moran process if and only if it is isothermal, thus the sum of all weights that lead into a vertex is the same for all vertices. Thus, for example, a complete graph with equal weights describes a Moran process. The fixation probability is

$$\begin{align}
\rho_M = \frac{1-r^{-1}} { 1-r^{-N} }
\end{align}$$

where r is the relative fitness of the invading type.

=== Selection amplifiers and suppressors ===
Graphs can be classified into amplifiers of selection and suppressors of selection. If the fixation probability of a single advantageous mutation $\rho_G$ is higher than the fixation probability of the corresponding Moran process $\rho_M$ then the graph is an amplifier, otherwise a suppressor of selection. One example of the suppressor of selection is a linear process where only vertex i-1 can replace vertex i (but not the other way around). In this case the fixation probability is $\rho_G = 1/N$ (where N is the number of vertices) since this is the probability that the mutation arises in the first vertex which will eventually replace all the other ones. Since $\rho_G < \rho_M$ for all r greater than 1, this graph is by definition a suppressor of selection.

=== Alternative formulations ===
Evolutionary graph theory may also be studied in a dual formulation, as a coalescing random walk, or as a stochastic process. We may consider the mutant population on a graph as a random walk between absorbing barriers representing mutant extinction and mutant fixation. For highly symmetric graphs, we can then use martingales to find the fixation probability as illustrated by Monk (2018).

Also evolutionary games can be studied on graphs where again an edge between i and j means that these two individuals will play a game against each other.

== Related concepts ==
Closely related stochastic processes include the voter model, which was introduced by Clifford and Sudbury (1973) and independently by Holley and Liggett (1975), and which has been studied extensively.

== Bibliography ==
- Holley, R. A.; Liggett, T. M. (1975). "Ergodic Theorems for Weakly Interacting Infinite Systems and the Voter Model". The Annals of Probability. 3 (4): 643–663. doi:10.1214/aop/1176996306.
- Liggett, Thomas M. (1999). Stochastic interacting systems: contact, voter, and exclusion processes. Berlin: Springer. ISBN 978-3-540-65995-2.
- Clifford, P.; Sudbury, A. (1973). "A model for spatial conflict". Biometrika. 60 (3): 581–588. doi:10.1093/biomet/60.3.581.
- Martin A. Nowak (2006). Evolutionary dynamics: exploring the equations of life. Cambridge: Belknap Press of Harvard University Press. ISBN 978-0-674-02338-3.
- Monk, T. (2018). "Martingales and the fixation probability of high-dimensional evolutionary graphs". Journal of Theoretical Biology. 451: 10–18. Bibcode:2018JThBi.451...10M. doi:10.1016/j.jtbi.2018.04.039. PMID 29727631. S2CID 13682722.
