= Erez Lieberman Aiden =

American scientist (born 1980)

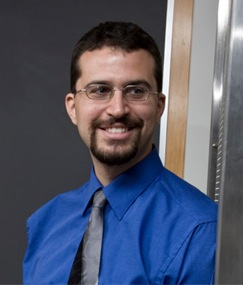
- Lieberman Aiden in 2011
- Born: Erez Lieberman; 1980 (age 45–46); Brooklyn, New York, U.S.
- Education: Princeton University (BS); Yeshiva University (MA); Harvard University (PhD)
- Spouse: Aviva Presser Aiden (m. 2005)
- Awards: Lemelson–MIT Student Prize, Technology Review TR35
- Scientific career
- Fields: Applied mathematics Molecular Biology; Biophysics
- Workplaces: Baylor College of Medicine
- Thesis: Evolution and the Emergence of Structure (2010)
- Doctoral advisor: Eric Lander; Martin Nowak
- Website: erez.com

Erez Lieberman Aiden (born 1980, né Erez Lieberman) is an American research scientist active in multiple fields related to applied mathematics. He is the Department Chair of Biochemistry and Molecular Biology at the University of Texas Medical Branch, Professor of Biosciences at Rice University, and formerly a fellow at the Harvard Society of Fellows and visiting faculty member at Google. Using mathematical and computational approaches, he has studied evolution in a range of contexts, including that of networks through evolutionary graph theory and languages in the field of culturomics. He has published scientific articles in a variety of disciplines.

Lieberman Aiden has won awards including the Lemelson–MIT Student Prize and the American Physical Society's Award for Outstanding Doctoral Thesis Research in Biological Physics. In 2009, Lieberman Aiden was named as one of 35 top innovators under 35 by Technology Review and in 2011 he was one of the recipients of the Presidential Early Career Award for Scientists and Engineers.

== Early life and education ==
Lieberman grew up in Brooklyn with three siblings. He began computer programming at the age of seven. His father, Aharon Lieberman, was a technology entrepreneur and owned a factory in New Jersey. As a child Lieberman Aiden spoke Hebrew and Hungarian, making English his third language.

Lieberman Aiden studied mathematics, physics, and philosophy at Princeton, and earned a master's degree in History at Yeshiva University. He proceeded to complete a joint PhD in mathematics and bioengineering at the Harvard–MIT Division of Health Sciences and Technology, where he was advised by Eric Lander and Martin Nowak.

== Research and career ==
Lieberman Aiden contributed to the founding of evolutionary graph theory along with his PhD supervisor Martin Nowak. He has since been involved in researching the three dimensional structure of the human genome and the field of culturomics.

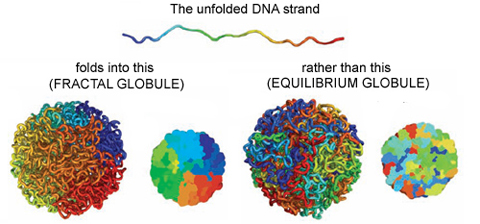
The fractal globule model (left) of three-dimensional genome structure suggested by Lieberman Aiden and coworkers contrasted with an equilibrium model (right) (Small pictures shows cross-sections)

=== 3D genome structure ===
Lieberman Aiden was part of a team of scientists from the University of Massachusetts Medical School and MIT that first suggested human DNA folds into a fractal globule rather than an equilibrium globule. This finding explains how each cell's genome is able to be heavily compacted without forming a knot. Lieberman Aiden and coworkers invented a variant of chromosome conformation capture called "Hi-C" which produces a genome-wide measure of contact probabilities that point to a 3-dimensional genome structure. This technique combines existing chromosome capture methodology with next-generation sequencing, enabling an all-versus-all measure of chromatin contacts.

In 2009 this work was published in the journal Science and was featured as a cover illustration. Following the publication, Lieberman Aiden was quoted as saying:

We’ve long known that on a small scale, DNA is a double helix … But if the double helix didn’t fold further, the genome in each cell would be two meters long. Scientists have not really understood how the double helix folds to fit into the nucleus of a human cell, which is only about a hundredth of a millimeter in diameter. This new approach enabled us to probe exactly that question.

In 2014, he served as a senior author on an article in Cell which described a refined method of Hi-C which his team used to describe the fundamental organization of DNA.

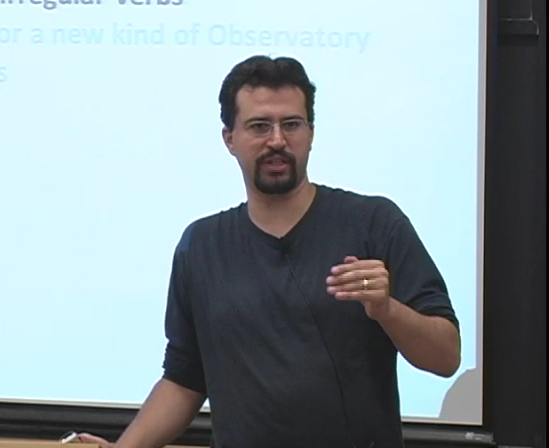
Erez Lieberman Aiden lecturing on culturomics at Harvard University in 2011

=== Culturomics ===
Lieberman Aiden was involved in the analysis of a corpus of around 5 million digitised books, applying data mining techniques to advance the new field of culturomics. Leiberman Aiden was involved in a project to digitise Anglo-Saxon texts in 2004, analysis of which provided supporting evidence for verb regularisation, a process whereby irregular verbs become increasingly regular over time.

After the announcement of Google Books, Lieberman Aiden approached Google's Director of Research Peter Norvig and was permitted to statistically analyse their data. His work contributed to the Google Ngram Viewer, released in December 2010, which makes use of culturomics ideas to produce normalized historical trends for any sequence of letters. This project published a number of findings in the journal Science, including the changing dynamic of fame and instances of literary censorship during the Second World War.

=== Awards and honors ===
In 2008 Lieberman Aiden was awarded the Lemelson-MIT Student Prize for his work on the iShoe, meant to assist elderly people with balance problems and prevent falls that could cause injury. The following year, the iShoe was listed as one of "20 New Biotech Breakthroughs that Will Change Medicine" by Popular Mechanics. A year later Lieberman Aiden was named as one of 35 top innovators under 35 (TR35) by MIT's Technology Review magazine.

In 2010, the American Physical Society presented Lieberman Aiden with the Award for Outstanding Doctoral Thesis Research in Biological Physics for his thesis titled "Evolution and the emergence of structure". His doctoral dissertation was also awarded the Hertz Thesis Prize. Lieberman Aiden is also the recipient of an NIH Director's New Innovator Award and was named, along with 95 other American researchers, as a recipient of the Presidential Early Career Award for Scientists and Engineers in 2011.

In 2014 Lieberman Aiden was deemed an Emeritus McNair Scholar at the Baylor College of Medicine.

== Personal life ==
Erez Lieberman married Aviva Presser in 2005; following the marriage both husband and wife appended to their surnames "Aiden", which means Eden in Hebrew and, in Gaelic, little fire. They have a son named Gabriel Galileo, a daughter called Maayan Amara and another boy called Judah Avraham. Outside of scientific interests, Lieberman Aiden participated in a modern art collaboration with Nicholas Kahn and Richard Selesnick which was exhibited in galleries in the United States and Europe.

Lieberman Aiden and his wife founded Bears Without Borders, a nonprofit organisation which distributes stuffed toys to the developing world.
