= Rufus Isaacs =

Rufus Isaacs may refer to:

- Rufus Isaacs, 1st Marquess of Reading (1860–1935), English politician and jurist
- Rufus Isaacs (game theorist) (1914–1981), American mathematician
