= Ulla Pursiheimo =

Finnish mathematician (born 1944)

Ulla Irmeli Pursiheimo (born 4 May 1944) is a Finnish mathematician who became the first female mathematics professor in Finland. Her areas of interest in mathematics include mathematical optimization, control theory, search games, and later in her career mathematics education.

Pursiheimo earned her doctorate from the University of Turku in 1971. Her dissertation, Optimization of Search With Constant Spreading Speed of Effort, was supervised by Olavi Hellman. She became a full professor of mathematics at the University of Turku in 1974, and retired to become a professor emerita in 1999.
