= Jaśkiewicz =

Jaśkiewicz is a Polish surname. Notable people with the surname include:

- Anna Jaśkiewicz, Polish mathematician
- Stanisław Jaśkiewicz (1907–1980), Polish actor
- Sławomira Wronkowska-Jaśkiewicz (born 1943), Polish jurist
