= Sultanahmet demonstrations =

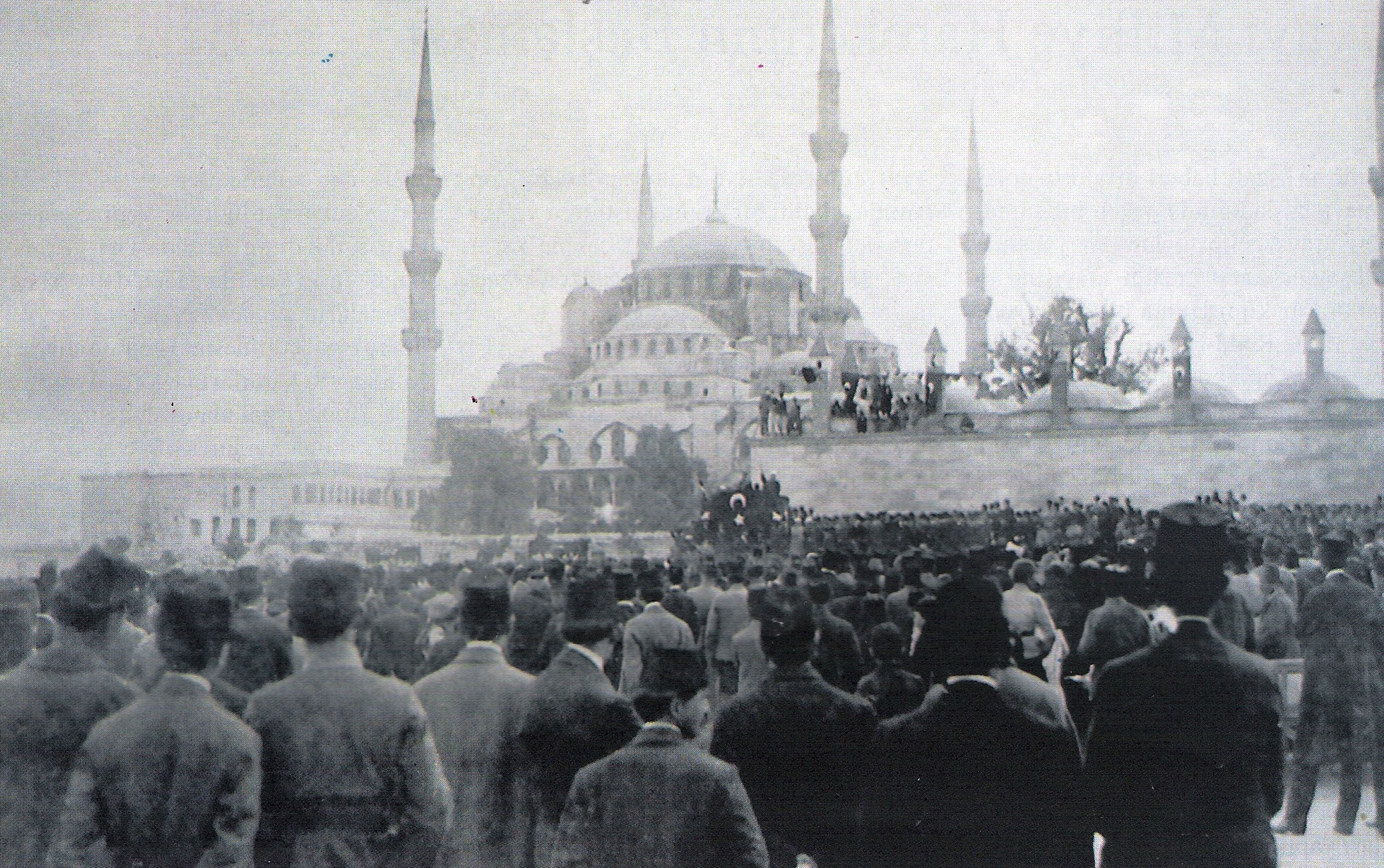
Demonstration on May 23

The Sultanahmet demonstrations (Turkish: Sultanahmet Mitingleri) were a series of rallies in 1919 held in Istanbul to protest the occupation of the Ottoman Empire following the Armistice of Mudros, especially the occupation of Izmir by Greek forces after the First World War. The largest of the demonstrations took place in the Sultanahmet neighborhood on 23 May 1919, with 200,000 people attending.

The first demonstration was organized in front of the Sultan Ahmed Mosque in Fatih, in March 1919 by İnâs Darülfünunu (Women's University) and the Association of Modern Women (Turkish: Asri Kadınlar Cemiyeti). On 19 May 1919, another protest was organized in Fatih by the Turkish Hearths and attended by 50,000. On 20 May and 22 May, demonstrations were held in Üsküdar and Kadıköy respectively, organized by the Association of Modern Women.

Many important figures of the Ottoman Empire participated, such as Mehmet Emin Yurdakul, Halide Edib Adıvar, Hamdullah Suphi Tanrıöver, Rıza Nur, Selim Sırrı Tarcan, İsmayıl Hakkı Baltacıoğlu, Fahreddin Hayri Bey, Kemal Mithad, Şükûfe Nihal Başar, and Madam Jeannine (a French Lady), who all called resistance against the foreign invasion.

Halide Edip was a major speaker during the Sultanahmet demonstration on 23 May 1919, stating the following:

Muslims! Turks! The Turk and the Muslim are now experiencing their darkest day. Night, a dark night. But there is no night without morning in life. Tomorrow we will create a glittering morning, tearing this terrible night. Women! We have now no tools such as cannons, guns; but a greater and a stronger weapon, we have; Hak and Allah. Guns and cannons may be lost, but Hak and Allah are everlasting. We, with our men, ask for the strongest, most intelligent, most courageous cabinet from our own heart that will represent us the best.

The demonstrations were symbolic for the national awakening for Turks to carry out the Turkish War of Independence. They were also key to the women's rights movement and feminism in Turkey, as women's activism and greatly increased visibility during the War of Independence constituted a turning point, greatly contributing to the expansion of women's rights.

== See also ==
- Occupation of Smyrna
