= Angel problem =

Question in combinatorial game theory

The blue dotted region shows where an angel of power 3 could reach.

The angel problem is a question in combinatorial game theory proposed by John Horton Conway. The game is commonly referred to as the angels and devils game. The game is played by two players called the angel and the devil. It is played on an infinite chessboard (or equivalently the points of a 2D lattice). The angel has a power k (a natural number 1 or higher), specified before the game starts. The board starts empty with the angel in one square. On each turn, the angel jumps to a different empty square which could be reached by at most k moves of a chess king, i.e. the distance from the starting square is at most k in the infinity norm. The devil, on its turn, may add a block on any single square not containing the angel. The angel may leap over blocked squares, but cannot land on them. The devil wins if the angel is unable to move. The angel wins by surviving indefinitely.

The angel problem is: Can an angel with high enough power win?

There must exist a winning strategy for one of the players. If the devil can force a win, then it can do so in a finite number of moves. If the devil cannot force a win then there is always an action that the angel can take to avoid losing, and a winning strategy for it is always to pick such a move. More abstractly, the "pay-off set" (that is, the set of all plays in which the angel wins) is a closed set (in the natural topology on the set of all plays), and it is known that such games are determined. Of course, for any infinite game, if player 2 does not have a winning strategy, then player 1 can always pick a move that leads to a position where player 2 does not have a winning strategy, but in some games, simply playing forever does not confer a win to player 1, so undetermined games may exist.

Conway offered a reward for a general solution to this problem ($100 for a winning strategy for an angel of sufficiently high power, and $1000 for a proof that the devil can win regardless of the angel's power). Progress was made first in higher dimensions. In late 2006, the original problem was solved when independent proofs appeared, showing that an angel can win. Bowditch proved that a 4-angel (that is, an angel with power k = 4) can win, and Máthé and Kloster gave proofs that a 2-angel can win.

== History ==
The problem was first published in the 1982 book Winning Ways by Berlekamp, Conway, and Guy, under the name "the angel and the square-eater". In two dimensions, some early partial results included:

- If the angel has power 1, then the devil has a winning strategy. (According to Conway, this result is actually due to Berlekamp.) This can be read at section 1.1 of Kutz's paper.
- If the angel never decreases its y-coordinate, then the devil has a winning strategy.
- If the angel always increases its distance from the origin, then the devil has a winning strategy.

In three dimensions, it was shown that:

- If the angel always increases its y-coordinate, and the devil can only play in one plane, then the angel has a winning strategy.
- If the angel always increases its y-coordinate, and the devil can only play in two planes, then the angel has a winning strategy.
- If the angel has power 13 or more, then it has a winning strategy.
- If there are an infinite number of devils, each playing at distances $d_1 < d_2 < d_3 < \cdots$, then the angel can still win if it is of high-enough power. ("Playing at distance $d$" means that the devil is not allowed to play within this distance of the origin).

Finally, in 2006 (not long after the publication of Peter Winkler's book Mathematical Puzzles, which helped publicize the angel problem), there emerged four independent and almost-simultaneous proofs that the angel has a winning strategy in two dimensions. Brian Bowditch's proof works for the 4-angel, while Oddvar Kloster's proof and András Máthé's proof work for the 2-angel. Additionally, Peter Gacs has a claimed proof which requires a much stronger angel; the details are fairly complex and have not been reviewed by a journal for accuracy. The proofs by Bowditch and Máthé have been published in Combinatorics, Probability and Computing. The proof by Kloster has been published in Theoretical Computer Science.

== Further unsolved questions ==
In a 3D variant, the angel must increase its y-coordinate with every move, while the devil is limited to blocking squares that lie within three fixed planes. It remains unknown whether the devil has a winning strategy under these conditions.

== Proof sketches ==
=== Kloster's 2-angel proof ===
Oddvar Kloster discovered a constructive algorithm to solve the problem with a 2-angel. This algorithm is quite simple and also optimal, since, as noted above, the devil has a winning strategy against a 1-angel.

We start out by drawing a vertical line immediately to the left of the angel's starting position, down to $y = -\infty$ and up to $y = \infty$. This line represents the path the angel will take, which will be updated after each of the devil's moves, and partitions the board's squares into a "left set" and a "right set". Once a square becomes part of the left set, it will remain so for the remainder of the game, and the angel will not make any future moves to any of these squares. Every time the devil blocks off a new square, we search over all possible modifications to the path such that we move one or more squares in the right set which the devil has blocked off into the left set. We will only do this if the path increases in length by no more than twice the number of blocked squares moved into the left set. Of such qualifying paths, we choose one that moves the greatest number of blocked off squares into the left set. The angel then makes two steps along this path, keeping the path to its left when moving in the forward direction (so if the devil were not blocking off squares, the angel would travel north indefinitely). When going clockwise around a corner, the angel will not move for one step, because the two segments touching the corner have the same square to their right.

=== Máthé's 2-angel proof ===
Máthé introduces the nice devil, which never destroys a square that the angel could have chosen to occupy on an earlier turn. When the angel plays against the nice devil, it concedes defeat if the devil manages to confine it to a finite bounded region of the board (otherwise the angel could just hop back and forth between two squares and never lose). Máthé's proof breaks into two parts:

1. he shows that if the angel wins against the nice devil, then the angel wins against the real devil;
2. he gives an explicit winning strategy for the angel against the nice devil.

Roughly speaking, in the second part, the angel wins against the nice devil by pretending that the entire left half-plane is destroyed (in addition to any squares actually destroyed by the nice devil), and treating destroyed squares as the walls of a maze, which it then skirts by means of a "hand-on-the-wall" technique. That is, the angel keeps its left hand on the wall of the maze and runs alongside the wall. One then proves that a nice devil cannot trap an angel that adopts this strategy.

The proof of the first part is by contradiction, so Máthé's proof does not immediately yield an explicit winning strategy against the real devil. However, Máthé remarks that his proof could in principle be adapted to give such an explicit strategy.

=== Bowditch's 4-angel proof ===
Brian Bowditch defines a variant (game 2) of the original game with the following rule changes:

1. The angel can return to any square it has already been to, even if the devil subsequently tried to block it.
2. A k-devil must visit a square k times before it is blocked.
3. The angel moves either up, down, left, or right by one square (i.e. as a wazir).
4. To win, the angel must trace out a circuitous path (defined below).

A circuitous path is a path $\pi = \cup^{\infty}_{i=1} (\sigma_i \cup \gamma_i)$ where $\sigma = \cup^{\infty}_{i=1} \sigma_i$ is a semi-infinite arc (a non-self-intersecting path with a starting point but no ending point) and ${\gamma_i}$ are pairwise disjoint loops with the following property:

- $\forall i: |\gamma_i|\leq i$ where $|\gamma_i|$ is the length of the ith loop.

(To be well-defined, $\gamma_i$ must begin and end at the end point of $\sigma_i$ and $\sigma_i$ must end at the starting point of $\sigma_{i+1}$.)

Bowditch considers a variant (game 1) of the game with the changes 2 and 3 with a 5-devil. He then shows that a winning strategy in this game will yield a winning strategy in our original game for a 4-angel. He then goes on to show that an angel playing a 5-devil (game 2) can achieve a win using a fairly simple algorithm.

Bowditch claims that a 4-angel can win the original version of the game by imagining a phantom angel playing a 5-devil in the game 2.

The angel follows the path the phantom would take but avoiding the loops. Hence as the path $\sigma$ is a semi-infinite arc, the angel does not return to any square it has previously been to, so the path is a winning path even in the original game.

=== 3D version of the problem ===
==== "Guardian" proof ====
The proof, which shows that in a three-dimensional version of the game a high powered angel has a winning strategy, makes use of "guardians". For each cube of any size, there is a guardian that watches over that cube. Each guardian decides at each move whether the cube it is watching over is unsafe, safe, or almost safe. The definitions of "safe" and "almost safe" need to be chosen to ensure this works. This decision is based purely on the density of blocked points in that cube and the size of that cube.

If the angel is given no orders, then it just moves up. If some cubes that the angel is occupying cease to be safe, then the guardian of the biggest of these cubes is instructed to arrange for the angel to leave through one of the borders of that cube. If a guardian is instructed to escort the angel out of its cube to a particular face, the guardian does so by plotting a path of subcubes that are all safe. The guardians in these cubes are then instructed to escort the angel through their respective subcubes. The angel's path in a given subcube is not determined until the angel arrives at that cube. Even then, the path is only determined roughly. This ensures the devil cannot just choose a place on the path sufficiently far along it and block it.

The strategy can be proven to work because the time it takes the devil to convert a safe cube in the angel's path to an unsafe cube is longer than the time it takes the angel to get to that cube.

This proof was published by Imre Leader and Béla Bollobás in 2006. A substantially similar proof was published by Martin Kutz in 2005.

== See also ==
- The homicidal chauffeur problem, another mathematical game which pits a powerful and maneuverable adversary against a highly resourceful but less powerful foe.
- Pursuit–evasion, a similar family of problems.
- Maxwell's demon
- Laplace's demon
