= Anna Jaśkiewicz =

Polish mathematician

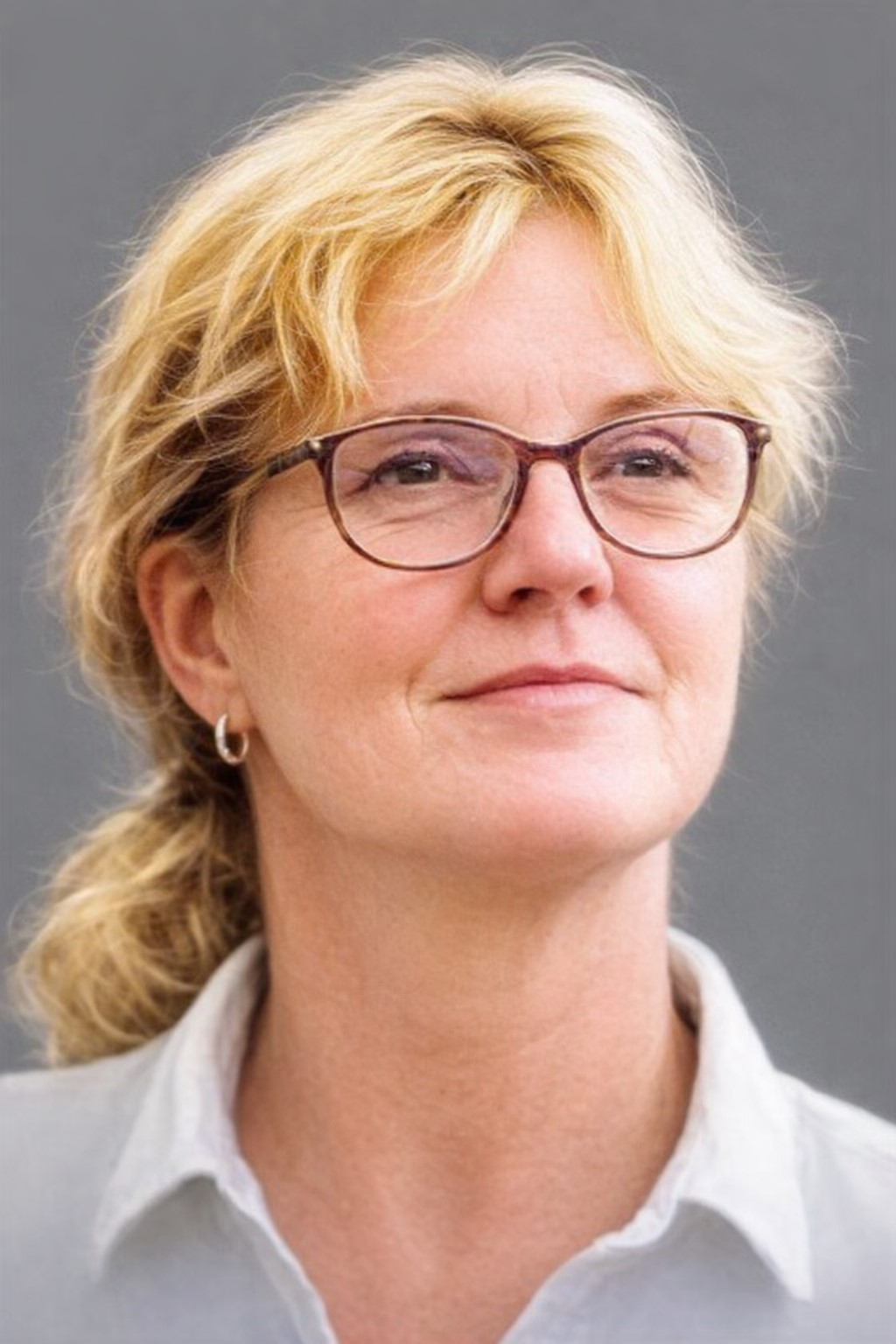
- Born: Wrocław, Poland
- Education: Wrocław University of Science and Technology
- Known for: Stochastic games, Markov and semi-Markov decision processes, and risk-sensitive control
- Scientific career
- Fields: Applied mathematics, Game Theory
- Workplaces: Wrocław University of Science and Technology
- Doctoral advisor: Andrzej S. Nowak
- Website: wmat.pwr.edu.pl/pracownicy/anna-jaskiewicz

Anna Jaśkiewicz is a Polish mathematician and a professor of mathematics at Wrocław University of Science and Technology. Her research focuses on stochastic games, Markov control processes, dynamic programming, and risk-sensitive optimization, with applications to economic dynamics and operations research.

== Education and career ==
Jaśkiewicz was a student at the Faculty of Fundamental Problems of Technology, Wrocław University of Science and Technology, where she earned a master's degree in mathematics in 2000. In 2003, at the Institute of Mathematics and Computer Science, Wrocław University of Technology she defended her PhD thesis in mathematics on semi-Markov decision processes and stochastic games with the distinction. Her PhD advisor was Andrzej S. Nowak. She completed her habilitation in mathematics in 2010 and was awarded the title of professor by the President of Poland in 2021. She has been affiliated with Wrocław University of Science and Technology throughout her academic career, where she currently holds a professorship in the Faculty of Pure and Applied Mathematics.

== Research ==
Her work addresses stochastic dynamic decision models, including Markov decision processes, stochastic games, recursive methods in economic dynamics, risk-sensitive criteria, and issues of time inconsistency in control models .

=== Selected Publications ===
Her publications include articles in SIAM Journal on Control and Optimization, Automatica, Journal of Economic Theory, Mathematics of Operations Research, Finance and Stochastics, and Dynamic Games and Applications.

Anna Jaśkiewicz obtained her most important research results in stochastic games and dynamic decision models with standard and risk sensitivity payoff criteria. Her interests focus on time inconsistency, the existence of Nash equilibria, in particular Markov perfect equilibria.

== Service and recognition ==
Jaśkiewicz has served as an associate editor of Dynamic Games and Applications, Operations Research Letters, and SIAM Journal on Control and Optimization. She has been a member of the Executive Board of the International Society of Dynamic Games and has acted as a reviewer for doctoral and habilitation theses in Poland and abroad. She is a recipient of research fellowships from the Alexander von Humboldt Foundation and has received multiple Rector's Awards from Wrocław University of Science and Technology for scientific achievements.
