= Leon Petrosyan =

Russian professor of Applied Mathematics

Leon Petrosjan
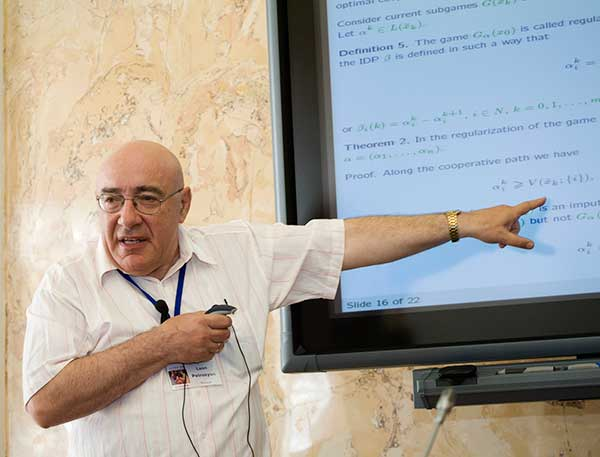
- Leon Petrosjan
- Born: December 18, 1940 (age 85); Leningrad, USSR
- Education: St. Petersburg University
- Awards: Order of Friendship
- Scientific career
- Fields: Game theory
- Thesis: On a class of Pursuit Games (1965)
- Doctoral advisor: Nikolai Nikolaevich Vorobiev

Leon Aganesovich Petrosjan (Russian: Леон Аганесович Петросян) (born December 18, 1940) is a professor of Applied Mathematics and the Head of the Department of Mathematical Game theory and Statistical Decision Theory at the St. Petersburg University, Russia.

== Fields of research ==
The research interests of Leon Petrosjan lie mostly in the fields of operations research, game theory, differential games, and control theory.

In particular, he contributed to the study of the following topics:

1. Solution of zero-sum simple pursuit games such as "lifeline game", "two pursuers – one evader game", "deadline game in a half plane". Proof of the existence of an epsilon-saddle point in piecewise open loop strategies in general dynamic zero-sum games with prescribed duration and independent motions. Method of solution of pursuit games based on the technique of invariant counter of pursuit (regular case).
2. Differential pursuit games with incomplete information including games with information delay about the state of the game. Finite search games and dynamic search games. Construction of saddle points using mixed piecewise open loop strategies. Solution of concrete games with incomplete information.
3. Investigation and refinement of the Nash equilibrium concept for multistage games with perfect information, on the bases of the so-called players preference functions. Proof of the uniqueness of such an equilibrium. Derivation of the system of the first order partial differential extremal equations for the payoffs in Nash equilibrium for differential games. Description of classes of Nash equilibrium in concrete differential games.
4. Statement and investigation of the time-consistency problem in n-person differential games. Analysis of classical optimality principles from cooperative and non cooperative game theory from the point of their time consistency. Proof of the time inconsistency of the most known optimality principles. Regularization methods (integral and differential) based upon the IDP (imputation distribution procedures) which gives the possibility of construction new time consistent optimality principles from the previously time inconsistent ones.
5. Applications to environmental protection. Methods of creation of time consistent policy in long range environmental planning based upon the considered approaches for cooperative and non cooperative differential games.

== Academic activities ==
Leon Petrosjan is the Editor of the journal International Game Theory Review (W.S. Pbl., Singapore, London); the Editor of the international periodical Game Theory and Applications (Nova sci. Pbl. N.Y., USA); the Chief Editor of the Vestnik Peterburgskogo Universiteta, seria 10: Applied Mathematics, Control, Informatics; and the Chief Editor of the journal Mathematical Game Theory and Applications (Karelian Research Centre of RAS).

Two special issues of the International Game Theory Review were dedicated to Prof. Leon A. Petrosyan — one of the Founding Editors of the Review — on his 70th and 75th birthdays (Vol. 12, No. 4, 2010 and Vol. 18, No. 2, 2016).

== Education ==
- Dr.Sc. Saint Petersburg State University, 1972
- Ph.D. Vilnius State University, 1965
- M.A. Saint Petersburg State University, 1962

== Selected publications ==
1. Petrosyan L. A. Yeung D. W. K. Subgame-consistent Economic Optimization. Springer, 2012.
2. Petrosyan L. A., Gao H. Dynamic Games and Applications. 2009. (in Chinese).
3. Yeung D. W. K., Petrosyan L. A., Lee M. C. C. Dynamic Cooperation: A Paradigm on the Cutting Edge of Game Theory. China Market Press, 2007.
4. Yeung D. W. K., Petrosyan L. A. Cooperative Stochastic Differential Games. Springer, 2006.
5. Petrosjan L. A., Zenkevich N. A. Game Theory. World Scientific Publisher, 1996.
6. Petrosjan L. A. Differential Games of Pursuit. World Scientific Publisher, 1993.
