= Differential game =

Concept in game theory

In game theory, differential games are dynamic games that unfold in continuous time, meaning players’ actions and outcomes evolve smoothly rather than in discrete steps, and for which the rate of change of each state variable—like position, speed, or resource level—is governed by a differential equation. This distinguishes them from turn-based games (sequential games) like chess, focusing instead on real-time strategic conflicts.

Differential games are sometimes called continuous-time games, a broader term that includes them. While the two overlap significantly, continuous-time games also encompass models not governed by differential equations, such as those with stochastic jump processes, where abrupt, unpredictable events introduce discontinuities.

Early differential games, often inspired by military scenarios, modeled situations like a pursuer chasing an evader, such as a missile targeting an aircraft. Today, they also apply to fields like economics and engineering, analyzing competition over resources or the control of moving systems.

== Connection to optimal control ==
Differential games are related closely to optimal control problems. In an optimal control problem there is single control $u(t)$ and a single criterion to be optimized; differential game theory generalizes this to two controls $u_{1}(t),u_{2}(t)$ and two criteria, one for each player. Each player attempts to control the state of the system so as to achieve its goal; the system responds to the inputs of all players.

== History ==
In the study of competition, differential games have been employed since a 1925 article by Charles F. Roos. The first to study the formal theory of differential games was Rufus Isaacs, publishing a text-book treatment in 1965. One of the first games analyzed was the 'homicidal chauffeur game'.

== Random time horizon ==
Games with a random time horizon are a particular case of differential games. In such games, the terminal time is a random variable with a given probability distribution function. Therefore, the players maximize the mathematical expectancy of the cost function. It was shown that the modified optimization problem can be reformulated as a discounted differential game over an infinite time interval

== Applications ==
Differential games have been applied to economics. Recent developments include adding stochasticity to differential games and the derivation of the stochastic feedback Nash equilibrium (SFNE). A recent example is the stochastic differential game of capitalism by Leong and Huang (2010). In 2016 Yuliy Sannikov received the John Bates Clark Medal from the American Economic Association for his contributions to the analysis of continuous-time dynamic games using stochastic calculus methods.

Additionally, differential games have applications in missile guidance and autonomous systems.

For a survey of pursuit–evasion differential games see Pachter.

== See also ==
- Lotka–Volterra equations
- Mean-field game theory
