= John Robert Pringle =

American biologist

John Pringle
- Education: Harvard University
- Awards: E. B. Wilson Medal (2013)
- Scientific career
- Fields: Molecular biology Genetics
- Workplaces: Stanford University

John R. Pringle is an American scientist. He is a professor at Stanford University. He received an AB in Mathematics from Harvard University and a PhD in Biology also from Harvard University (1970).

He is the 2013 recipient of the E.B. Wilson Medal, the American Society for Cell Biology's highest honor for science. He was elected to the National Academy of Sciences in 2017.

He married Beverly S. Mitchell (September 5, 1971) and has two children, Robert and Elizabeth both biologists.
