= Başar =

- Pronunciation: Turkish: [ˈbaʃaɾ]
- Gender: Male

Origin
- Origin: Turkish
- Meaning: "achieve", "thrive"

Başar is a Turkish male given name and surname.

== Name statistics ==
Başar is the 1020th most popular name in Turkey. 1/9,816 of all Turks are named Başar, so its popularity is 0.1 in a thousand. If this is compared to Turkey's population statistics, there are 7,423 Başars and 119 are born each year.

== Given name ==
- Başar Oktar (born 2002), Turkish Figure Skater
- Başar Önal (born 2004), Dutch-born Turkish footballer
- Başar Sabuncu (1943–2017), Turkish film director, screenwriter, cinematographer and occasional actor

== Surname ==
- Enes Başar (born 1993), Turkish Greco-Roman wrestler
- Günseli Başar (1932–2013), Turkish beauty contestant and Miss Europe 1952
- Hakkı Başar (born 1969), Turkish sport wrestler
- Kemal Başar (born 1963), Turkish theatre director, drama teacher and translator
- Metehan Başar (born 1991), Turkish wrestler
- Mikail Başar (born 2001), Turkish footballer
- Oya Başar (born 1956), Turkish actress
- Şükûfe Nihal Başar (1896–1973), Turkish school teacher, poet, novelist and women's right activist
- Tamer Başar (born 1946), Turkish control theorist
- Yunus Emre Başar (born 1995), Turkish Greco-Roman wrestler
