= Google Books Ngram Viewer =

Online tool for charting the frequency of words and phrases in printed texts

Example of an Ngram query

The Google Books Ngram Viewer is an online search engine that charts the frequencies of any set of search strings using a yearly count of n-grams found in printed sources published between 1500 and 2022 in Google's text corpora in English, Chinese (simplified), French, German, Hebrew, Italian, Russian, or Spanish. There are also some specialized English corpora, such as American English, British English, and English Fiction.

The program can search for a word or a phrase. The n-grams are matched with the text within the selected corpus, and if found in 40 or more books, are then displayed as a graph. The program supports searches for parts of speech and wildcards. It is routinely used in research.

== History ==
The Ngram Viewer was created by Google software engineers Will Brockman and Jon Orwant, who teamed up with Harvard researchers Jean-Baptiste Michel and Erez Lieberman Aiden. The service was released on December 16, 2010. Before the release, it was difficult to quantify the rate of linguistic change because of the absence of a database that was designed for this purpose, said Steven Pinker, a well-known linguist who was one of the co-authors of the Science paper published on the same day. The Google Books Ngram Viewer was developed in the hope of opening a new window to quantitative research in the humanities field, and the database contained 500 billion words from 5.2 million books publicly available from the very beginning.

The intended audience was scholarly, but the Google Books Ngram Viewer made it possible for anyone with a computer to see a graph that represents the diachronic change of the use of words and phrases with ease. Lieberman said in response to The New York Times that the developers aimed to provide even children with the ability to browse cultural trends throughout history. In the Science paper, Lieberman and his collaborators called the method of high-volume data analysis in digitized texts "culturomics".

== Usage ==
Commas delimit user-entered search terms, where each comma-separated term is searched in the database as an n-gram (for example, "nursery school" is a 2-gram or bigram). The Ngram Viewer then returns a plotted line chart. Due to limitations on the size of the Ngram database, only matches found in at least 40 books are indexed.

== Limitations ==
The data sets of the Ngram Viewer have been criticized for their reliance upon inaccurate optical character recognition (OCR) and for including large numbers of incorrectly dated and categorized texts. Because of these errors, and because they are uncontrolled for bias (such as the increasing amount of scientific literature, which causes other terms to appear to decline in popularity), care must be taken in using the corpora to study language or test theories. Furthermore, the data sets may not reflect general linguistic or cultural change and can only hint at such an effect because they do not involve any metadata like date published, author, length, or genre, to avoid any potential copyright infringements.

Systemic errors like the confusion of s and f in pre-19th century texts (due to the use of ſ, the long s, which is similar in appearance to f) can cause systemic bias. Although the Google Books team claims that the results are reliable from 1800 onwards, poor OCR and insufficient data mean that frequencies given for languages such as Chinese may only be accurate from 1970 onward, with earlier parts of the corpus showing no results at all for common terms, and data for some years containing more than 50% noise.

Guidelines for doing research with data from Google Ngram have been proposed that try to address some of the issues discussed above.

== See also ==
- Google Trends
- Lexical analysis

== Bibliography ==
- Lin, Yuri; et al. (July 2012). "Syntactic Annotations for the Google Books Ngram Corpus" (PDF). Proceedings of the 50th Annual Meeting. Demo Papers. 2. Jeju, Republic of Korea: Association for Computational Linguistics: 169–174. 2390499. "Whitepaper presenting the 2012 edition of the Google Books Ngram Corpus"
