= Shmuel Gal =

Israeli mathematician and professor of statistics

- שמואל גל
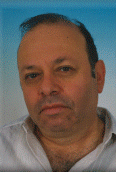
- Born: 1940 (age 85–86)
- Education: Hebrew University of Jerusalem
- Known for: Gal's accurate tables method, Princess and monster game, search games, rendezvous problems
- Scientific career
- Fields: Mathematics, Statistics
- Workplaces: University of Haifa
- Doctoral advisor: Aryeh Dvoretzky

Shmuel Gal (Hebrew: שמואל גל; born 1940) is a mathematician and professor of statistics at the University of Haifa in Israel.

He devised the Gal's accurate tables method for the computer evaluation of elementary functions. With Zvi Yehudai he developed in 1993 a new algorithm for sorting which is used by IBM.

Gal has solved the Princess and monster game and made several significant contributions to the area of search games.

He has been working on rendezvous problems with his collaborative colleagues Steve Alpern, Vic Baston, and John Howard.

Gal received a Ph.D. in mathematics from the Hebrew University of Jerusalem. His thesis advisor was Aryeh Dvoretzky.
