= Robert M. Pringle =

American biologist and conservationist

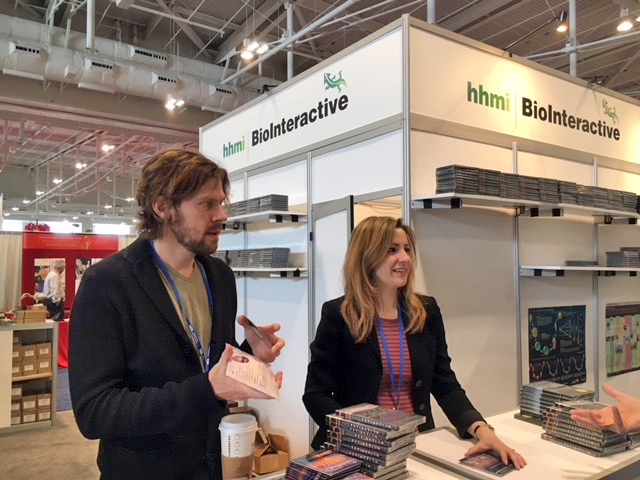
- Pringle (left) and Corina Tarnita in 2015 at the National Science Teaching Association convention in Nashville, Tennessee
- Born: 1979 (age 46–47); Ann Arbor, Michigan
- Education: University of Pennsylvania; University of Oxford; Stanford University
- Awards: Guggenheim Fellowship
- Scientific career
- Fields: Ecology
- Workplaces: Princeton University

Robert Mitchell Pringle is an American biologist and conservationist.

He is professor and director of undergraduate studies in the department of ecology and evolutionary biology at Princeton University.

Pringle's research combines field and laboratory methods to understand biological interactions and biodiversity loss in terrestrial ecosystems, chiefly African savannas.

One major focus of Pringle's work has been understanding the ecological impacts of armed conflict and the dynamics of postwar ecosystem restoration in Mozambique’s Gorongosa National Park.

== Early life and education ==
Pringle was born in Ann Arbor, Michigan.

His father, cell biologist John R. Pringle, and mother, cancer biologist Beverly Mitchell, encouraged his love of nature.

Pringle’s sister, Elizabeth, is a professor of ecology and evolutionary biology at the University of Nevada, Reno.

Pringle graduated from the University of Pennsylvania in 2001, completed an M.Sc. degree at the University of Oxford in 2004, and received a Ph.D. in biology from Stanford University in 2009. He was a Junior Fellow in the Harvard Society of Fellows before joining the Princeton faculty in 2012.

== Career ==
Pringle's research has experimentally documented the keystone roles played by large herbivores, carnivores, and subterranean termites in regulating biodiversity and ecosystem function in savannas.

In 2013, Pringle's lab was among the first to use DNA metabarcoding to understand dietary niche differentiation and its role in sustaining the coexistence of animal species.

Pringle also worked with Princeton colleagues Corina Tarnita and Juan Bonachela to develop new theories about the formation of large, regular vegetation patterns, such as the Namib Desert fairy circles.

Pringle's work in Gorongosa has focused on measuring the ecological and evolutionary impacts of losing large herbivores and carnivores, as well as the dynamics of community reassembly as these species have been restored. This research was featured in the Emmy Award nominated nature documentary, Nature’s Fear Factor.

Pringle serves on the board of the Guanacaste Dry Forest Conservation Fund, a nonprofit organization supporting conservation and biodiversity research in Costa Rica’s Area de Conservación Guanacaste. With Simon Levin and Corina Tarnita, he is the editor of the Monographs in Population Biology published by Princeton University Press, a series of influential books in ecology and evolutionary biology.

== Recognition ==
Pringle received the Early Career Investigator Award from the American Society of Naturalists in 2011 and was named an Early Career Fellow of the Ecological Society of America in 2015.

Students at Princeton have described Pringle as a passionate and creative teacher.

The parasitoid wasp Lytopylus robpringlei was named after Pringle in 2011, in honor of his conservation work. This species was later transferred into the genus Aerophilus.

In 2024, Pringle was named a Guggenheim Fellow.

== Personal life ==
Pringle is married to Corina Tarnita, a mathematician and biologist who is also a professor at Princeton. Pringle and Tarnita have collaborated on multiple research projects.
