= Corina Tarnita =

Mathematical biologist

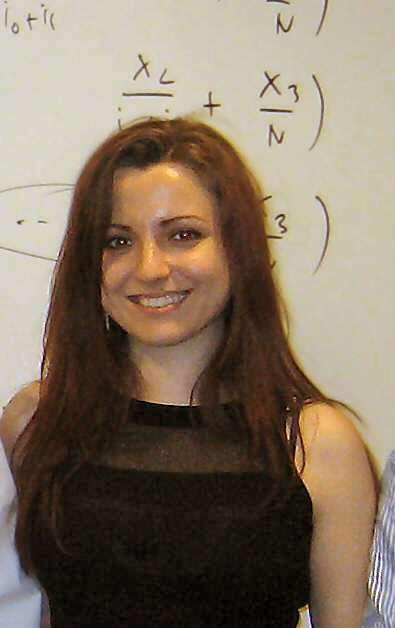
- Tarnita in 2008
- Education: Harvard University (BA, MA, PhD)
- Awards: Harvard Society of Fellows Alfred P. Sloan Research Fellowship ESA Early Career Fellow Kavli Frontiers of Science Fellow of the National Academy of Sciences Guggenheim Fellowship
- Scientific career
- Fields: Mathematical biology, Complex systems science, Self-organization
- Workplaces: Princeton University
- Thesis: Evolutionary Dynamics in Structured Populations (2009)
- Doctoral advisor: Martin Nowak
- Website: https://ctarnita.scholar.princeton.edu/

Corina Tarnita is a Romanian-American mathematician and theoretical biologist known for her work in mathematical biology and complex adaptive systems. She is currently the Frederick D. Petrie Professor of Ecology and Evolutionary Biology at Princeton University. Her research examines how living organisms organize themselves into patterns at different scales.

== Early life and education ==
Born in Craiova, Romania, Tarnita showed an early aptitude for mathematics, encouraged by her mother, a professor of materials science and engineering. She won the Romanian National Mathematical Olympiad three times from 1999 to 2001. Tarnita moved to the United States to pursue higher education, obtaining her B.A. (2006), M.A. (2008), and Ph.D. (2009) in Mathematics from Harvard University. She was a Junior Fellow in the Harvard Society of Fellows before joining the Princeton University faculty in 2013.

== Research and career ==
Initially focused on high-dimensional mathematics, Tarnita was inspired by Martin Nowak's work on evolutionary dynamics and shifted to studying mathematical biology. This change led her to complete her Ph.D. under Nowak's supervision, finishing in just three years.

Tarnita's 2010 paper, "The evolution of eusociality," co-authored with Martin A. Nowak and Edward O. Wilson, challenged the long-standing kin selection theory and proposed a new model for the evolution of eusociality, sparking significant debate and reevaluation in the field of evolutionary biology. The response included a rebuttal published in Nature from over a hundred researchers.

Working with Princeton colleagues Robert Pringle and Juan Bonachela, Tarnita developed new theories about the formation of large, regular vegetation patterns, such as fairy circles in the Namib Desert.

Tarnita's research on "loner" behavior in slime molds revealed that this seemingly non-cooperative trait is actually an evolutionarily stable strategy, challenging previous assumptions about social behavior in microorganisms.

In 2024, Tarnita was named a Guggenheim Fellow.

=== Relationship with Jeffrey Epstein ===
Tarnita met convicted sex offender Jeffrey Epstein while she was a graduate student working under Nowak at Harvard in 2008. She remained in contact with Epstein through 2012, including emails that refer to his 2008 conviction. In 2009, she helped Epstein anonymously wire transfer $10,000 and $5,000 respectively to two Romanian women for scholarships.

== Selected publications ==
- Nowak, Martin A.; Tarnita, Corina E.; Wilson, Edward O. (2010). "The evolution of eusociality". Nature. 466 (7310): 1057–1062. doi:10.1038/nature09205. ISSN 0028-0836. PMID 20740005.
- Bonachela, J. A.; Pringle, R. M.; Sheffer, E.; Coverdale, T. C.; Guyton, J. A.; Caylor, K. K.; Levin, S. A.; Tarnita, C. E. (2015). "Termite mounds can increase the robustness of dryland ecosystems to climatic change". Science. 347 (6222): 651–655. doi:10.1126/science.1261487. ISSN 0036-8075. PMID 25657248.
- Tarnita, C. E.; Bonachela, J. A.; Sheffer, E.; Guyton, J. A.; Coverdale, T. C.; Long, R. A.; Pringle, R. M. (2017). "A theoretical foundation for multi-scale regular vegetation patterns". Nature. 541 (7637): 398–401. doi:10.1038/nature20801. ISSN 0028-0836. PMID 28102269.
