= George Leitmann =

American engineering scientist and educator (1925–2025)

- Born: May 24, 1925; Vienna, Austria
- Died: May 19, 2025 (aged 99)
- Education: BS, MA (Physics) – Columbia University; PhD (Engineering Science) – University of California, Berkeley
- Awards: National Academy of Engineering, USA; Six other national academies of science or engineering; Three honorary doctorates
- Scientific career
- Fields: Optimal Control, Dynamic Games, Uncertain Systems, and applications
- Workplaces: Professor of Engineering Science, University of California, 1957–2025, emeritus since 1991

George Leitmann (May 24, 1925 – May 19, 2025) was an Austrian-born American engineering scientist and educator.

== Background ==
Leitmann was born on May 24, 1925, to a fully assimilated Jewish family in Vienna, Austria. His paternal grandfather was a career officer with the rank of lieutenant colonel in the Imperial Army. His father had been a volunteer in the Austrian Army in World War I and was wounded twice on the Serbian front.

Nonetheless, by the spring of 1940 the situation in Austria had become so dangerous that Leitmann's father fled to neighboring Yugoslavia, still an independent kingdom, and the rest of the family, Leitmann, his mother and two grandmothers, were able to emigrate to the US in April 1940. Tragically, Yugoslavia was occupied by Germany a year later and Leitmann's father was murdered in a concentration camp in Niš, Serbia.

Leitmann attended a Technical High School in New York from which he graduated in December 1943, whereupon he immediately volunteered for the Army and was inducted in February 1944 into a Combat Engineer Battalion, which began its combat duties in France and Germany in late 1944. During the battle of the Colmar Pocket, Leitmann's unit was attached to the French First Army which liberated Colmar. For Leitmann's performance in this action as a member of the reconnaissance unit, he was awarded the Croix de Guerre avec Palme.

After the end of the war in Europe, Leitmann was transferred to the Army Counter-Intelligence Corps as its youngest Special Agent and, among other assignments, served as an interrogator at the Nuremberg War Crimes Trial. In 1955, he married Nancy Lloyd. They had two children, son Josef, and daughter Elaine, as well as three grandchildren and two great-grandchildren.

Leitmann died on May 19, 2025, five days before turning 100.

== Academic career ==
After the discharge from the army in May 1946, Leitmann studied physics at Columbia University and received the BA and MS degrees in 1949 and 1950, respectively. From 1950 to 1957, he was employed at the US Naval Ordnance Station (USNOTS), China Lake, California, first as a physicist and then head of the aeroballistics analysis section. This assignment involved both theoretical as well as experimental research in the exterior ballistics of rockets. While working at USNOTS, he also enrolled in the PhD program of the University of California, Berkeley, from which he received the PhD in engineering science in 1956. He joined the engineering faculty at UC Berkeley in 1957 as an assistant professor, and was advanced to associate professor in 1959 and professor in 1963. He was emerited in 1991 and continued both research and university service until 2018.

== Research contributions and academic services ==
Leitmann contributed greatly to the theory of optimal control, dynamic games, and operations research, as well as applications to exterior ballistics of rockets, aerospace systems, economics, ecology, epidemiology, counterterrorism, and others, reported in 15 books (including An Introduction to Optimal Control, The Calculus of Variations and Optimal Control, Qualitative and Quantitative Differential Games, and Cooperative and Non-cooperative Many Player Games) and over 300 technical journal articles. His service to the academic community, especially the University of California, Berkeley, ranged from four Associate Deanships, Academic Senate Committee Service such as the Budget Committee, chair of the Committee on Privilege and Tenure, the first University Ombudsman during the riot-ridden late sixties, and many advisory committees such as the chair of the system-wide Advisory Committee on Research Expeditions Programs. He also served the wider academic community by service on advisory boards at other universities.

== Professional services ==
Leitmann held membership in many professional and government committees. He was the Founding President of the American Alexander von Humboldt Association (1994–1997). He was Co-Editor of the Journal of Mathematical Analysis and Applications for 16 years and served as associate editor of four journals and editorial board member of eight journals.

== Honors and awards ==
The following constitutes a partial list. He was a member of the US National Academy of Engineering and a Foreign or Corresponding Member of six other national Academies of Science or Engineering. He held honorary doctorates from three universities (University of Paris, Technical University of Vienna, and Technical University of Darmstadt). His numerous prizes and medals include: the Senior Scientist Prize, Heisenberg and Humboldt Medals of the Humboldt Foundation, the Austrian Cross of Honor for Science and Art, the Levy Medal of the Franklin Institute, the Oldenburger Medal of the ASME, the first Isaacs Award (shared with Professor Y. C. Ho) of the International Society of Dynamic Games, and the Bellman Control Heritage Award of the American Automatic Control Council. He was a Commander of the German and Italian Orders of Merit. In 2013 he became Chevalier de la Légion d'honneur (Knight of the Legion of Honor).
