= Andrzej Nowak (psychologist) =

Polish psychologist

Andrzej Nowak (born June 12, 1953, in Warsaw) is a Polish psychologist, one of the founders of dynamical social psychology. He is a pioneer in applying computer simulations in social sciences.

Nowak received his M.A. (1978) and his Ph.D. (1987) from the University of Warsaw. His scientific interests include complex systems in psychology and social sciences.

Andrzej Nowak is currently a professor at the University of Warsaw, at the SWPS University of Social Sciences and Humanities, and at Florida Atlantic University. He is the director and founder of the Institute of Social Psychology of Internet and Communication at the Warsaw School of Social Sciences and Humanities. He is one of the founders of the Institut for Social Studies at the Warsaw University, where he is a director of the Center for Complex Systems Research.

Nowak is one of the world's leading experts on the modeling and computer simulation of social processes. Using cellular automata, he has modeled the emergence of public opinion in society and linear versus non-linear societal transitions. At FAU, he conducts both simulation and experimental research in the Dynamical Social Psychology Lab in collaboration with Robin Vallacher.

Current research projects include the use of cellular automata to simulate the emergence and maintenance of self-concept and linear and non-linear scenarios of societal change, the use of attractor neural networks to model interpersonal and group dynamics, and the use of coupled dynamical systems to simulate the emergence of personality through social coordination. Dr. Nowak is also developing software for identifying attractors (equilibrium states) in the temporal patterns of thought and emotion on the part of people diagnosed with various forms of mental illness.

== Books ==
- Vallacher, R. R. & Nowak, A. (Eds.) (1994). Dynamical systems in social psychology. San Diego: Academic Press.
- Nowak, A. & Vallacher, R. R. (1998). Dynamical social psychology. New York: Guilford Press.
- Liebrand, W., Nowak, A., & Hegselman, R. (Eds.) (1998). Computer modeling of social processes. New York: SAGE.
- Culicover, P. & Nowak, A. (2003). Dynamical Grammar: Minimalism, Acquisition, and Change (Foundations of Syntax). Oxford: Oxford University Press.
