= Rendezvous problem =

Logical dilemma

The rendezvous dilemma is a logical dilemma, typically formulated in this way:

Two people have a date in a park they have never been to before. Arriving separately in the park, they are both surprised to discover that it is a huge area and consequently they cannot find one another. In this situation each person has to choose between waiting in a fixed place in the hope that the other will find them, or else starting to look for the other in the hope that they have chosen to wait somewhere.

If they both choose to wait, they will never meet. If they both choose to walk there are chances that they meet and chances that they do not. If one chooses to wait and the other chooses to walk, then there is a theoretical certainty that they will meet eventually; in practice, though, it may take too long for it to be guaranteed. The question posed, then, is: what strategies should they choose to maximize their probability of meeting?

Examples of this class of problems are known as rendezvous problems. These problems were first introduced informally by Steve Alpern in 1976, and he formalised the continuous version of the problem in 1995. This has led to much recent research in rendezvous search. Even the symmetric rendezvous problem played in n discrete locations (sometimes called the Mozart Cafe Rendezvous Problem) has turned out to be very difficult to solve, and in 1990 Richard Weber and Eddie Anderson conjectured the optimal strategy. In 2012 the conjecture was proved for n = 3 by Richard Weber. This was the first non-trivial symmetric rendezvous search problem to be fully solved. The corresponding asymmetric rendezvous problem has a simple optimal solution: one player stays put and the other player visits a random permutation of the locations.

As well as being problems of theoretical interest, rendezvous problems include real-world problems with applications in the fields of synchronization, operating system design, operations research, and even search and rescue operations planning.

== Deterministic rendezvous problem ==
The deterministic rendezvous problem is a variant of the rendezvous problem where the players, or robots, must find each other by following a deterministic sequence of instructions. Although each robot follows the same instruction sequence, a unique label assigned to each robot is used for symmetry breaking.

== See also ==
- Coordination game
- Dining philosophers problem
- Probabilistic algorithm
- Rendezvous hashing
- Search games
- Sleeping barber problem
- Superrationality
- Symmetry breaking
- Focal point, a default meeting place
