= Anton Nowak =

Austrian artist and graphic designer

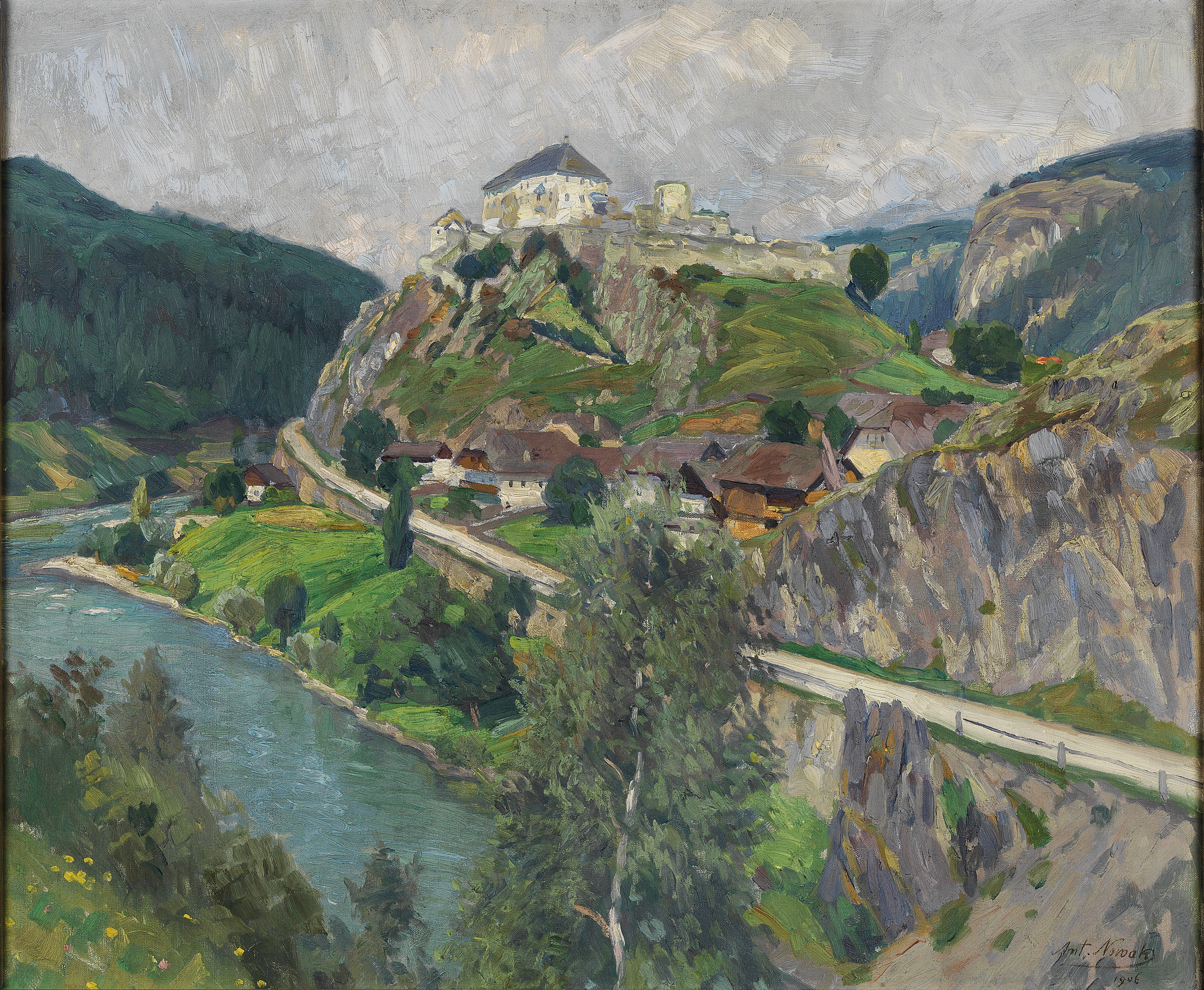
The Sonnenburg

Anton Nowak (10 May 1865 – 28 May 1932) was an Austrian artist and graphic designer.

== Life ==
Nowak was born in Maribor and studied at the Academy of Fine Arts, Vienna under Christian Griepenkerl and Leopold Karl Müller. In 1894, he joined the Vienna Künstlerhaus.

He was a founding member of the Vienna Secession, and had a work shown at the group's first exhibition. Nowak contributed woodcuts to the group's magazine Ver Sacrum, taking inspiration from the northern Adriatic region. He was on the group's working committee in 1898, 1902, and served as the group's president in 1908–09.

He also painted watercolours of Austrian countryside and the city of Brno, where he ran a painting school. He may have died in the city, but this is not certain.

== Style ==
Nowak's paintings were brightly coloured and naturalistic; under the Secession's influence, he experimented with pointillism in the style of Théo van Rysselberghe. His work as a designer was firmly within the Secession's tradition. He was influenced by Theodor von Hörmann.
