= Robin Vallacher =

American Professor of Psychology

Robin Vallacher is an American professor of Psychology at Florida Atlantic University where he directs the Dynamical Social Psychology Lab. He is also a Research Associate in the Center for Complex Systems, University of Warsaw, Poland, and a Research Affiliate in the Advanced Consortium on Cooperation, Conflict, and Complexity at Columbia University, New York.

In his work, Vallacher has applied complexity and dynamical systems to social psychology. Additional research interests include social judgment, self-concept and interpersonal processes.

== Education ==
Vallacher earned a BA in Psychology from San Diego State University and a PhD in Psychology from Michigan State University.

== Academic service ==
Vallacher serves on the editorial board of the academic journal Psychological Inquiry, published by the science publishing house Taylor & Francis.

== Academic impact ==
As of January 2024, Vallacher’s publications have been cited more than 14,800 times, according to his Google Scholar profile. His h-index is 50.
