= Fractal globule =

A fractal globule also sometimes called a crumpled globule is a name used to describe polymers that have compact local and global scaling. They can be modeled through a Hamiltonian Walk, a lattice walk in which every point is only visited once and no paths intersect, this prevents knot formation. A crumpled globule is a non-equillibrium structure that can be formed through crumpling of a polymer at all length scales, i.e. collapsing in on themselves and this iteratively occurring over the whole polymer. This process follows the Space Filling Peano Curve. It has been proposed that mammalian chromosomes form fractal globules.
