= Combinatorics, Probability and Computing =

- Discipline: Combinatorics, probability, theoretical computer science
- Language: English
- Edited by: Béla Bollobás

Publication details
- History: 1992–present
- Publisher: Cambridge University Press
- Frequency: Bimonthly
- Open access: Delayed, after 6 months
- Impact factor: 1.032 (2020)

Standard abbreviations
- ISO 4: Comb. Probab. Comput.
- MathSciNet: Combin. Probab. Comput.

Indexing
- CODEN: CPCOFG
- ISSN: 0963-5483 (print); 1469-2163 (web)
- LCCN: 92660061
- OCLC no.: 26286529

Links
- Journal homepage; Online access; Online archive

Combinatorics, Probability and Computing is a peer-reviewed scientific journal in mathematics published by Cambridge University Press. Its editor-in-chief is Béla Bollobás (DPMMS and University of Memphis).

== History ==
The journal was established by Bollobás in 1992. Fields Medalist Timothy Gowers calls it "a personal favourite" among combinatorics journals and writes that it "maintains a high standard".

== Content ==
The journal covers combinatorics, probability theory, and theoretical computer science. Currently, it publishes six issues annually. As with other journals from the same publisher, it follows a hybrid green/gold open access policy, in which authors may either place copies of their papers in an institutional repository after a six-month embargo period, or pay an open access charge to make their papers free to read on the journal's website.

== Abstracting and indexing ==
The journal is abstracted and indexed in:

- Compendex
- Computer Science Index
- Current Contents/Physical, Chemical & Earth Sciences
- Current Index to Statistics
- EBSCO databases
- Inspec
- MathSciNet
- ProQuest databases
- Referativnyi Zhurnal
- Science Citation Index Expanded
- Scopus
- Zentralblatt MATH

According to the Journal Citation Reports, the journal has a 2014 impact factor of 0.623. Since 2007, it has been ranked by SCImago Journal Rank as a first-quartile journal in four areas: applied mathematics, computational theory, statistics and probability, and theoretical computer science.
