= Operations Research Letters =

- Discipline: Operations research
- Language: English
- Edited by: Wolfram Wiesemann

Publication details
- History: 1981–present
- Publisher: Elsevier
- Frequency: Bimonthly
- Impact factor: 1.151 (2021)

Standard abbreviations
- ISO 4: Oper. Res. Lett.

Indexing
- ISSN: 0167-6377

Links
- Journal homepage; Online archive

Operations Research Letters is a bimonthly peer-reviewed academic journal covering operations research. It was established in 1981 and is published by Elsevier. The editor-in-chief is Wolfram Wiesemann.

== Abstracting and indexing ==
The journal is indexed and abstracted in:

- Engineering Index
- Mathematical Reviews
- INSPEC
- Current Contents
- Zentralblatt MATH
- Science Citation Index Expanded
