= Karl Sigmund =

Austrian mathematician (born 1945)

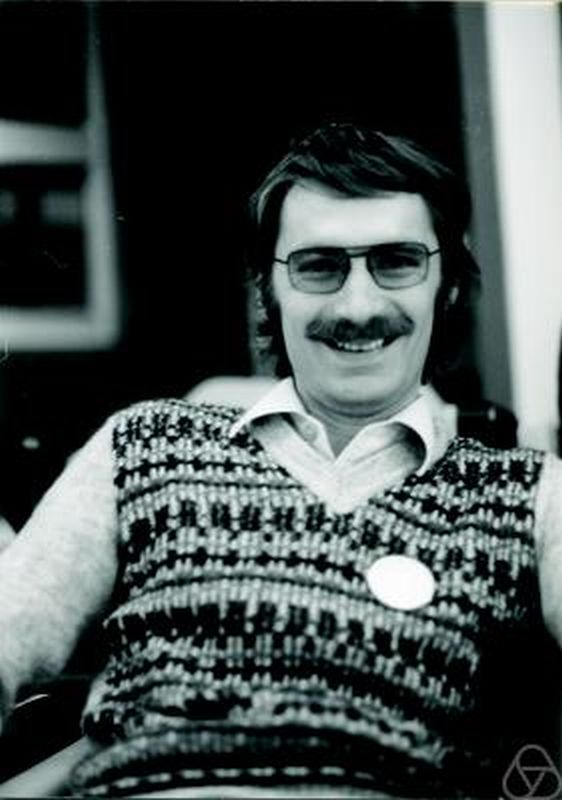
- Born: July 26, 1945 (age 81); Gars am Kamp, Lower Austria
- Education: University of Vienna
- Scientific career
- Fields: Mathematics
- Workplaces: University of Vienna
- Thesis: Über Verteilungsmaße von Maßfolgen auf lokalkompakten Gruppen (1968)
- Doctoral advisor: Leopold Schmetterer

Karl Sigmund (born July 26, 1945) is a professor of mathematics at the University of Vienna and one of the pioneers of evolutionary game theory.

== Career ==
Sigmund was schooled in the Lycée Francais de Vienne. From 1963 to 1968 he studied at the Institute of Mathematics at the University of Vienna, and obtained his Ph.D. under the supervision of Leopold Schmetterer. He spent his postdoctorate years (1968 to 1973) at Manchester ('68-'69), the Institut des hautes études scientifiques in Bures-sur-Yvette near Paris ('69-'70), the Hebrew University in Jerusalem (1970-'71), the University of Vienna (1971-'72) and the Austrian Academy of Sciences (1972-'73). In 1972 he received habilitation.

In 1973, Sigmund was appointed C3-professor at the University of Göttingen, and in 1974 became a full professor at the Institute of Mathematics in Vienna. His main scientific interest during these years was in ergodic theory and dynamical systems. From 1977 on, Sigmund became increasingly interested in different fields of biomathematics, and collaborated with Peter Schuster and de:Josef Hofbauer on mathematical ecology, chemical kinetics and population genetics, but especially on the new field of evolutionary game dynamics and replicator equations. Together with Martin Nowak, Christoph Hauert and Hannelore Brandt, he worked on game dynamical approaches to questions related with the evolution of cooperation in biological and human populations.

Since 1984, Sigmund has also worked as a part-time scientist at the International Institute for Applied Systems Analysis (IIASA) in Laxenburg, Lower Austria.

== Honours and recognition ==
Sigmund was head of the Institute of Mathematics at the University of Vienna from 1983 to 1985, managing editor of the scientific journal Monatshefte für Mathematik from 1991 to 2001, vice-president (1995 to 1997) and president (1997 to 2001) of the Austrian Mathematical Society, corresponding member (1996) and full member (1999) of the Austrian Academy of Sciences, and member of the Leopoldina (2003). He has also given many plenary lectures, for instance at the International Congress of Mathematicians in 1998. He was awarded the Gauss Lectureship in 2003.

In 2010 he received an honorary doctorate (Doctor Philosophiae Honoris Causa) from the University of Helsinki. In 2012 he received the Isaacs Award.

== Other details ==
During the last decade, Sigmund became increasingly interested in the history of mathematics and in particular, the Vienna Circle. He co-edited the mathematical works of Hans Hahn and Karl Menger and organised in 2001 an exhibition on the exodus of Austrian mathematicians fleeing the Nazis and in 2006 an exhibition on Kurt Gödel. From 2003 to 2005 he was vice-president of the Austrian Science Fund (FWF).

Because of his intimate knowledge of the Vienna Circle, Sigmund was invited to the Illinois Institute of Technology to speak at the inaugural Remembering Menger event on April 9, 2007.

== Publications ==
Sigmund's publications include 133 scientific papers, including 18 in Nature; 11 edited volumes; 25 essays; and 5 co-authored books.

=== Books ===
- Ergodic Theory on Compact Spaces with Manfred Denker and Christian Grillenberger, Springer, 1976.
- Evolutionstheorie und dynamische System: Mathematische Aspekte der Selection, with de:Josef Hofbauer, Paul Parey Verlag, 1984.
- The Theory of Evolution and Dynamic Systems, with de:Josef Hofbauer, Cambridge University Press, 1988. ISBN 978-0-521-35838-5 (English translation of the above. Updated in 1998, see below).
- Games of Life: Explorations in Ecology, Evolution, and Behaviour, Oxford University Press, 1993. ISBN 0-19-854665-3
- Evolutionary Games and Population Dynamics, with de:Josef Hofbauer, Cambridge University Press, 1998. ISBN 978-0-521-62570-8
- Kurt Gödel: Das Album - The Album with John W. Dawson Jr. and Kurt Mühlberger, Vieweg+Teubner Verlag, 2006. ISBN 978-3-8348-0173-9
- The Calculus of Selfishness, Princeton University Press, 2010. ISBN 9780691142753 2016 pbk reprint
- Games of Life: Explorations in Ecology, Evolution and Behavior, Dover Publications, 2012, updated in 2017.
- Exact Thinking in Demented Times: The Vienna Circle and the Epic Quest for the Foundations of Science, Basic Books, 2017. With a preface from Douglas Hofstadter who also helped with the translation. ISBN 9781541697829
- The Waltz of Reason: The Entanglement of Mathematics and Philosophy, Basic Books, 2023. ISBN 1541602692
