= Şükûfe Nihal =

Turkish educator, poet and activist

Şükûfe Nihal Başar
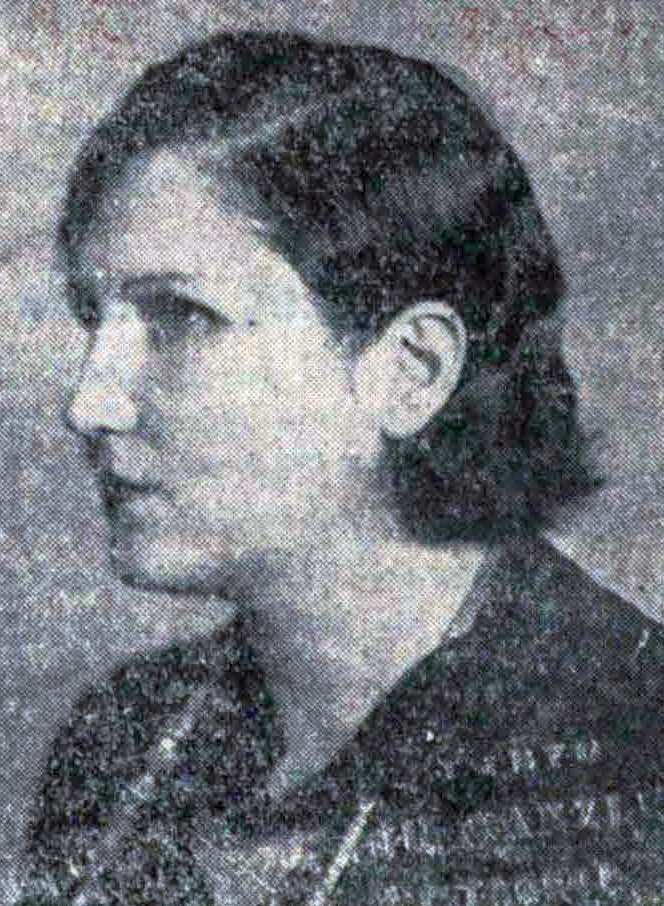
- Born: Şükûfe Nihal; 1896; Yeniköy, Sarıyer, Istanbul, Turkey
- Died: 26 September 1973 (aged 76–77); Istanbul, Turkey
- Education: Darülfünun
- Occupations: Educator, poet, writer
- Writing career
- Language: Turkish

Şükûfe Nihal Başar (1896 – 26 September 1973) was a Turkish educator, poet and activist, who took part in women's liberation movements during Turkey's nation building process.

== Private life ==
Şükûfe Nihal was born in Yeniköy, Sarıyer neighborhood of Istanbul in 1896. She was schooled in Damascus, then Ottoman Syria, and completed her secondary education in Thessaloniki, then Ottoman Greece, Beirut, then Ottoman lebanon and Istanbul due to her father's profession as a civil servant. She learned Literature, Arabic and Persian at home. She graduated from the Geography department of the Literature Faculty of İstanbul Darülfünün in 1919. she became the first woman higher education graduate in Turkey.

She died in Istanbul on 26 September 1973.

== Teaching and writing career ==
Whilst she worked as a teacher for many years in various high schools for girls in Istanbul, including for geography at Teacher's College, Bezmialem High School, Vefa High School and for literature at Nişantaşı High School, Kandilli High School for Girls, Kadıköy High School for Girls.

She authored seven poem books, a short story book, six novels and two travel books. From 1917 on, her poems and articles were published in various periodicals like "Türk Kadını" ("Turkish Woman"), "Yeni mecmua" ("New Periodical"), "Haftalık Gazete" ("Weekly Newspaper"), "Şair" ("Poet"), "Şair Nedim ve İfham" ("Poet Nedim and Inspiration"), "Dergâh" ("Dervish Lodge"), "Süs" ("Ornament"), "Firuze", "Kadın Yolu" (""Road of Woman), "Güneş" ("Sun")and "Hayat" ("Life").

== Women's right activist ==
Moreover, she took an active role in various women's associations, wrote columns in journals and newspapers about women's rights. Wanting to represent and express the voice of "the new women" of the early Turkish Republican era, she highlighted female characters in her short stories and novels. She argued that women had to have professions, yet she was against the fact that women were seeing marriage as a profession.

== Works ==
=== Poems ===
- Yıldızlar ve Gölgeler (1919)
- Hazan Rüzgârları (1927)
- Gayyâ (1930)
- Su (1935)
- Şile Yolları (1935)
- Sabah Kuşları (1943)
- Yerden Göğe (1960)
- Şükufe Nihal-Bütün Eseleri - Cilt:1 Şiirler (in Turkish). Vol. 1. Kitap Yurdu. 2008. p. 503. ISBN 978-605-10-5015-7.

=== Short story ===
- Tevekkülün Cezası (1928)

=== Novels ===
- Renksiz Istırap (1926)
- Yakut Kayalar (1931)
- Çöl Güneşi (1933)
- Yalnız Dönüyorum (1938)
- Yalnız Dönüyorum (in Turkish). Timaş Yayınları. 2005. p. 260. ISBN 975-649-167-1.
- Çölde Sabah Oluyor (1951)

=== Episode ===
- "Vatanım İçin" (Yeni İstanbul, 1 January – 28 February 1955)

=== Travel ===
- Finlandiya (1935)
- Domaniç Dağlarının Yolcusu (1946)
- Domaniç Dağlarının Yolcusu (in Turkish). Timaş Yayınları. 2013. p. 96. ISBN 978-975-263-826-6.
