= Martin Nowak =

Austrian-born scientist (born 1965)

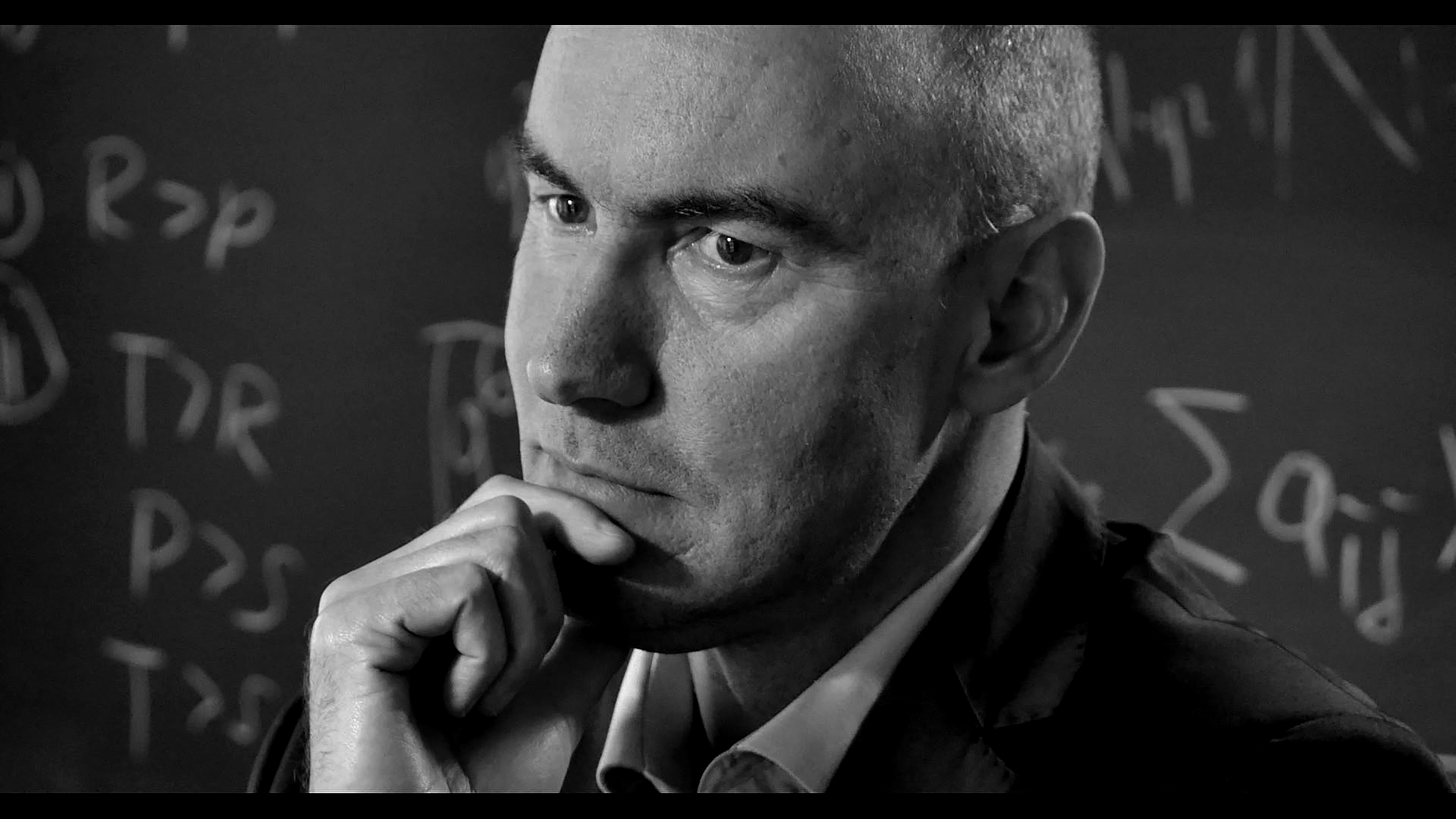
- Nowak in 2014
- Born: Martin Andreas Nowak; April 7, 1965 (age 61); Vienna, Austria
- Education: University of Vienna (PhD)
- Known for: evolutionary dynamics, somatic evolution in cancer, viral dynamics, language evolution
- Awards: Weldon Memorial Prize
- Scientific career
- Fields: Mathematical biology
- Workplaces: Harvard University; Max Planck Institute for Biophysical Chemistry; University of Oxford; Princeton University; Institute for Advanced Study
- Thesis: Stochastic strategies in the prisoner's dilemma (1989)
- Doctoral advisor: Karl Sigmund
- Doctoral students: Erez Lieberman Aiden; Sebastian Bonhoeffer; Marc Lipsitch; Franziska Michor; David G. Rand; Corina Tarnita
- Website: www.martinnowak.com

Martin Andreas Nowak (born April 7, 1965) is an Austrian-born professor of mathematics and biology at Harvard University. He is known for his work in evolutionary dynamics, focusing on evolutionary theory and viral dynamics.

Nowak held faculty positions at Oxford University and the Institute for Advanced Study in Princeton, before beginning a post at Harvard in July 2003.

Nowak was one of the primary recipients of funding from child sex offender Jeffrey Epstein to Harvard faculty, and Epstein left Nowak US$5,000,000 in his trust. He was placed on paid administrative leave by Harvard twice in response to his dealings with Epstein, first in 2021, and then in February 2026.

In March 2026 he resigned from the Austrian Academy of Sciences.

== Early life and education ==
Nowak was born in Vienna, Austria, on April 7, 1965. He studied at the Albertus Magnus Gymnasium in Vienna and the University of Vienna, where he earned a doctorate in biochemistry and mathematics in 1989. During his studies, he collaborated with Peter Schuster on quasispecies theory and with Karl Sigmund on the evolution of cooperation. Nowak received the Sub auspiciis Praesidentis award upon completing his doctorate at the University of Vienna.

== Career ==
In 1989, Nowak worked at the University of Oxford with Robert May as an Erwin Schrödinger Postdoctoral Scholar. He later became a Junior Research Fellow at Wolfson College and then Keble College. In 1992, he became a Wellcome Trust Senior Research Fellow in Biomedical Science before becoming a professor of Mathematical Biology in 1997.

In 1998, Nowak became the head of the Program in Theoretical Biology at the Institute for Advanced Study. In 2003, he became a professor of mathematics and biology at Harvard University. Nowak was also a co-director, with Sarah Coakley, of the Evolution and Theology of Cooperation project at Harvard, sponsored by the Templeton Foundation, where he was also a member of its Board of Advisors.

Nowak's research focuses on evolutionary game theory, cancer, viruses, infectious disease, the evolution of language and the evolution of cooperation. At Oxford, he helped to establish the fields of virus dynamics and spatial games (which later became evolutionary graph theory). He has collaborated with John Maynard Smith on genetic redundancy, Baruch Blumberg on the hepatitis B virus, Karl Sigmund on game theory, and with George Shaw and Andrew McMichael on HIV.

He has published several books on evolutionary dynamics, the evolution of cooperation, and religion.

=== Opposition to inclusive fitness theory ===
Nowak is a noted critic of inclusive fitness theory, and in 2010 published a paper along with Corina Tarnita and E. O. Wilson on the subject. A letter stating that Nowak's paper did not accurately represent inclusive fitness theory was co-signed by 137 authors and published in Nature. In 2016, Nowak and Benjamin Allen published further work critical of inclusive fitness theory. Jonathan Birch wrote in 2017 that there was "still little evidence of any serious reconciliation" between the two views.

== Personal life ==
Nowak is a Roman Catholic. In a 2007 lecture at Harvard, he argued that science and religion occupied different but complementary roles in humans' search for meaning, stating: "Science and religion are two essential components in the search for truth. Denying either is a barren approach."

== Relationship with Jeffrey Epstein ==
Nowak maintained a close personal and financial relationship with the financier and convicted sex offender Jeffrey Epstein. The preface of his 2006 textbook, Evolutionary Dynamics: Exploring the Equations of Life, ends with "I thank Jeffrey Epstein for many ideas and for letting me participate in his passionate pursuit of knowledge in all its forms."

In response to the revelations of Epstein's support of Nowak and his lab (the Program for Evolutionary Dynamics), in 2021 Nowak was suspended from supervising undergraduate research for two years, and the institute was permanently closed. Harvard's review, leading to the suspension, uncovered that Epstein had maintained access to a personal office in Nowak's lab for nine years, even after his conviction for sex crimes, and used the office over 40 times, "typically accompanied by young women serving as his assistants". Additionally, Nowak made contact with Epstein at least 150 times after his conviction, helping set up meetings with Harvard professors who Epstein used to connect with academics, politicians, and other guests.

In 2023, Harvard lifted the sanctions against Nowak, and he remains on the faculty, jointly appointed in the Department of Mathematics and the Department of Organismic and Evolutionary Biology.

On February 25, 2026, Harvard announced that Nowak had been placed on administrative leave from the university after a formal investigation was opened by the Faculty of Arts and Sciences.

Epstein left Nowak US$5,000,000 in his trust.
