= Andrzej Nowak (mathematician) =

Polish mathematician and game theorist (born 1952)

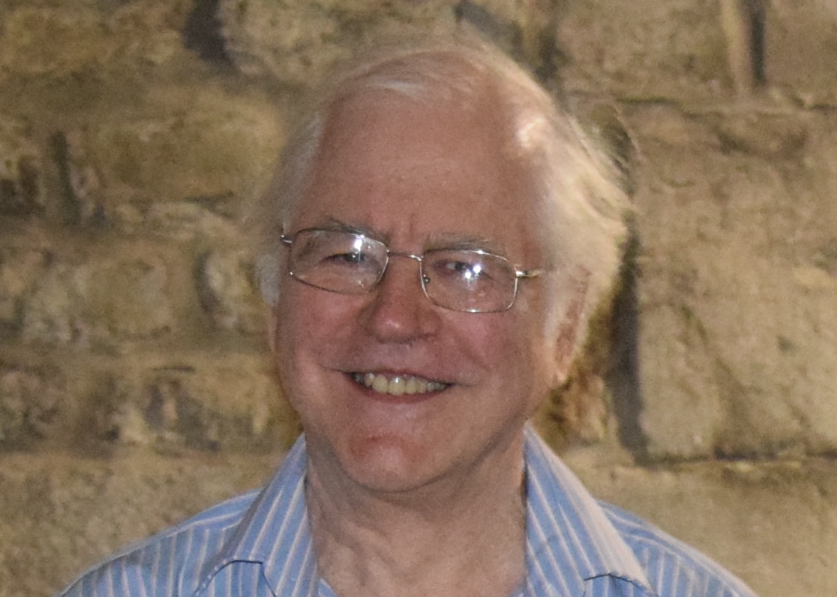
- Born: 29 October 1952 (age 73); Żagań, Poland
- Title: Professor of Mathematics (5 March 2004)
- Awards: The Isaacs Award (2018)

Academic background
- Education: Wrocław University of Science and Technology; Wrocław University
- Theses: On zero sum stochastic games with general state space (PhD) (13 May 1981); Optimal and equilibrium strategies in stochastic games (Habilitation: 19 October 1993)
- Doctoral advisor: Rastislav Telgarsky

Academic work
- Discipline: Mathematics; Game theory
- Institutions: University of Zielona Góra; University of Applied Sciences in Nysa, Poland
- Main interests: Game theory
- Website: Home page

Andrzej Nowak (born 29 October 1952 in Żagań) is a Polish mathematician known for his contributions to game theory, theory of economics and finance.

== Biography ==
In 1977, he graduated with a degree in mathematics from the Faculty of Fundamental Problems of Technology of Wrocław University of Science and Technology in Wrocław. He was a PhD student at the Institute of Mathematics at the Wroclaw University of Technology from 1977 to 1981, where he obtained his doctorate in 1981 based on the dissertation On zero sum stochastic games with general state space, written under the supervision of Rastislav Telgarsky. In 1993, he defended the dissertation at Faculty of Mathematics, Physics and Chemistry, Wrocław University, based on the work Optimal and equilibrium strategies in stochastic games.

After earning his doctoral degree in mathematics on 24 June 1981, he was employed as an assistant professor at the Institute of Mathematics and Computer Science at Wrocław University of Technology until 30 September 1999. After that, he moved to the Faculty of Mathematics at the University of Zielona Góra, where he has been affiliated with the Faculty of Mathematics, heading the Division of Mathematical Economics and Optimization from 2008 to 2016. In 2004, he was appointed professor of mathematics. He also served as the Head of Department of Finance at Faculty of Economic Sciences of University of Applied Sciences in Nysa, Poland.

== Contributions ==
His research articles can be found in Annals of Probability, Mathematics of Operations Research, SIAM Journal of Control and Optimization, Games and Economic Behavior, Journal of Economic Theory, Automatica. References to his papers can be found in mathematical databases. His most frequently cited works deal with stochastic games and cooperative games.

His editorial activities include participation on the editorial board of the journals: Dynamic Games and Applications, International Journal of Game Theory (2001–2008), Mathematical Methods of Operations Research (2006–2008).

He was the advisor of 3 PhD theses: Anna Jaśkiewicz, Piotr Szajowski, Łukasz Balbus.

He is the member of the International Society of Dynamic Games. In 2007–2011 he was a member of the Mathematical Committee of the Polish Academy of Sciences.

He became the recipient of The Isaacs Award (2018) and recognized Distinguish alumni of Wrocław University of Science and Technology.
