= List of games in game theory =

Game theory studies strategic interaction between individuals in situations called games. Classes of these games have been given names. This is a list of the most commonly studied games

== Explanation of features ==
Games can have several features, a few of the most common are listed here.

- Number of players: Each person who makes a choice in a game or who receives a payoff from the outcome of those choices is a player.
- Strategies per player: In a game each player chooses from a set of possible actions, known as pure strategies. If the number is the same for all players, it is listed here.
- Number of pure strategy Nash equilibria: A Nash equilibrium is a set of strategies which represents mutual best responses to the other strategies. In other words, if every player is playing their part of a Nash equilibrium, no player has an incentive to unilaterally change their strategy. Considering only situations where players play a single strategy without randomizing (a pure strategy) a game can have any number of Nash equilibria.
- Sequential game: A game is sequential if one player performs their actions after another player; otherwise, the game is a simultaneous move game.
- Perfect information: A game has perfect information if it is a sequential game and every player knows the strategies chosen by the players who preceded them.
- Constant sum: A game is a constant sum game if the sum of the payoffs to every player are the same for every single set of strategies. In these games, one player gains if and only if another player loses. A constant sum game can be converted into a zero sum game by subtracting a fixed value from all payoffs, leaving their relative order unchanged.
- Move by nature: A game includes a random move by nature.

== List of games ==
Game	Players	Strategies per player	No. of pure strategy Nash equilibria	Sequential	Perfect information	Zero sum	Move by nature
Battle of the sexes	2	2	2	No	No	No	No
Blotto games	2	variable	variable	No	No	Yes	No
Cake cutting	N, usually 2	infinite	variable	Yes	Yes	Yes	No
Centipede game	2	variable	1	Yes	Yes	No	No
Chicken (aka hawk–dove)	2	2	2	No	No	No	No
Coordination game	N	variable	>2	No	No	No	No
Cournot game	2	infinite	1	No	No	No	No
Deadlock	2	2	1	No	No	No	No
Dictator game	2	infinite	1	N/A	N/A	Yes	No
Diner's dilemma	N	2	1	No	No	No	No
Dollar auction	2	2	0	Yes	Yes	No	No
El Farol bar	N	2	variable	No	No	No	No
Game without a value	2	infinite	0	No	No	Yes	No
Gift-exchange game	N, usually 2	variable	1	Yes	Yes	No	No
Guess 2/3 of the average	N	infinite	1	No	No	Maybe	No
Hobbesian trap	2	2	1	No	No	No	No
Kuhn poker	2	27 & 64	0	Yes	No	Yes	Yes
Matching pennies	2	2	0	No	No	Yes	No
Minimum effort game aka weak-link game	N	infinite	infinite	No	No	No	No
Muddy Children Puzzle	N	2	1	Yes	No	No	Yes
Nash bargaining game	2	infinite	infinite	No	No	No	No
Optional prisoner's dilemma	2	3	1	No	No	No	No
Peace war game	N	variable	>2	Yes	No	No	No
Pirate game	N	infinite	infinite	Yes	Yes	No	No
Platonia dilemma	N	2	$2^N - 1$	No	Yes	No	No
Princess and monster game	2	infinite	0	No	No	Yes	No
Prisoner's dilemma	2	2	1	No	No	No	No
Public goods	N	infinite	1	No	No	No	No
Rock, paper, scissors	2	3	0	No	No	Yes	No
Screening game	2	variable	variable	Yes	No	No	Yes
Signaling game	N	variable	variable	Yes	No	No	Yes
Stag hunt	2	2	2	No	No	No	No
Traveler's dilemma	2	N >> 1	1	No	No	No	No
Truel	3	1-3	infinite	Yes	Yes	No	No
Trust game	2	infinite	1	Yes	Yes	No	No
Ultimatum game	2	infinite	infinite	Yes	Yes	No	No
Vickrey auction	N	infinite	1	No	No	No	Yes
Volunteer's dilemma	N	2	2	No	No	No	No
War of attrition	2	2	0	No	No	No	No
