= Orion's Arm =

Science fiction world-building project

Orion's Arm Universe Project
- Former name: Orion's Arm Worldbuilding Group
- Website type: Crowdsourced writing community
- Available in: English
- Area served: Worldwide
- Owners: Orion's Arm Universe Project, Inc.
- Founders: M. Alan Kazlev; Donna Malcolm Hirsekorn; Bernd Helfert; Anders Sandberg
- Website: www.orionsarm.com
- Launched: 2000

The Orion's Arm Universe Project (OA) is a multi-authored online hard science fiction world-building project, first established in 2000 by M. Alan Kazlev, Donna Malcolm Hirsekorn, Bernd Helfert and Anders Sandberg and further co-authored by many people since. Anyone can contribute articles, stories, artwork, or music to the website.

The first published Orion's Arm book, a collection of five novellas set within the OA universe, called Against a Diamond Sky, was released in September 2009.

== Canon ==
The fictional setting of Orion's Arm takes place about 10,000 years in the future, where an interstellar civilization spread across thousands of light-years, with inhabited planets and space habitats. Its inhabitants range from humans to extensively modified human beings, including superhumans with advanced augmentations and internal AI systems, while most people exist as software. Engineered wormholes are used for interstellar travel and transport, although not for time travel. The setting also includes several alien civilizations and evidence of more advanced alien societies in the past. At its highest levels, directed human evolution has produced vast godlike beings linked across interstellar distances, capable of understanding and creating technologies beyond ordinary minds.

== Reception ==
Orion's Arm has been reviewed in the role-playing magazine Knights of the Dinner Table, as well as on Boing Boing by transhumanist science fiction author Cory Doctorow.

References to the Encyclopaedia Galactica have been made in a book on overcoming Librarian stereotypes.

The Orion's Arm website has also been recommended in a children's teaching guide.

== See also ==
- Collaborative fiction
- Eclipse Phase
- Transhuman Space
- Hannu Rajaniemi's Jean le Flambeur novel trilogy: The Quantum Thief, The Fractal Prince and The Causal Angel
