= Steven Cohen =

Steve, Steven or Stephen Cohen may refer to:

== Sportspeople ==
- Steve Cohen (gymnast) (born 1946), American Olympic gymnast
- Steve Cohen (judoka) (born 1955), American judoka and Olympian
- Steve Cohen (wrestler) (born 1963), South African wrestler better known as Steve Simpson
- Steven Cohen (footballer) (born 1986), French association football player

== Academics ==
- Steven A. Cohen (academic) (born 1953), American environmental writer and academic
- Stephen F. Cohen (1938–2020), American scholar specializing in Russian studies
- Steven M. Cohen (born 1950), American sociologist
- Stephen P. Cohen (1936–2019), American academic and senior fellow in foreign policy studies at the Brookings Institution
- Stephen P. Cohen (Middle East scholar) (1945–2017), Canadian scholar specializing in Middle Eastern affairs

== Others ==
- Steve Cohen (politician) (born 1949), U.S. congressman from Tennessee
- Steve Cohen (businessman) (born 1956), hedge fund manager and owner of the New York Mets baseball team
- Steve Cohen (magician) (born 1971), parlor magician from New York City
- Stephen Cohen (entrepreneur) (born 1982), American entrepreneur and computer scientist
- Steve Cohen (author) (active since 1983), author and lawyer
- Stephen M. Cohen (active since 1995), American criminal

== See also ==
- Stephen Cohn (active since 1966), American composer
- Stephan Cohen (born 1971), French pocket billiards player
- Steve Kuhn (disambiguation)
