= Purges of the Communist Party of the Soviet Union =

Purges of the Communist Party in the Soviet Union (Russian: "Чистка партийных рядов", chistka partiynykh ryadov, "cleansing of the party ranks") were Soviet political events, especially during the 1920s, in which periodic reviews of members of the Communist Party were conducted by other members and the security organs to get rid of "undesirables". Such reviews would start with a short autobiography from the reviewed person and then an interrogation of them by the purge commission, as well as by the attending audience. Although many people were victims of the purge throughout this decade, the general Soviet public was not aware of the purge until 1937.

Although the term "purge" is largely associated with Stalinism because the greatest of the purges happened during Stalin's rule, the Bolsheviks carried out their first major purge of the party ranks as early as 1921. Approximately 220,000 members were purged (i. e. expelled from the Party). The Bolsheviks stated as justification the need to get rid of the members who had joined the party simply to be on the winning side. The major criteria were social origins (members of working classes were normally accepted without question) and contributions to the revolutionary cause.

The first Party purge of the Joseph Stalin era took place in 1929–1930 in accordance with a resolution of the XVI Party Conference. Purges became deadly under Stalin. More than 10 percent of the party members were purged. At the same time, a significant number of new industrial workers joined the Party.

== History ==
=== 1932 to 1935 ===
Stalin ordered a systematic party purge in the Soviet Union in December 1932, to be performed during 1933. During this period, new memberships were suspended. A joint resolution of the Party Central Committee and Central Revision Committee specified the criteria for purging and called for setting up special Purge Commissions, to which every communist had to report. Furthermore, this purge concerned members of the Central Committee and of the Central Revision Committee, who previously had been immune to purges, because they were elected at Party Congresses. In particular, Nikolai Bukharin, Alexei Ivanovich Rykov, and Mikhail Tomsky were asked to defend themselves during this purge. As the purges unfolded, it became increasingly apparent that what had begun as an attempt to cleanse the party of unequipped and defecting members would culminate in nothing less than a cleansing of integral party members of all ranks. This included many prominent leading party members that had ruled the regime for over a decade. At this time, of 1.9 million members, approximately 18 percent were purged (i.e. expelled from the party).

Until 1933, those purged (totaling 800,000) were not usually arrested. (The few that were became the first waves of the gulag forced labor system.) But from 1934 onwards, during the Great Purge, the connotations of the term changed, because being expelled from the party came with the possibility of arrest, with long imprisonment or execution following. The Party Central Committee would later state that the careless methodology used resulted in serious errors and perversions which hindered the work of cleansing the party from its real enemies.

=== Great Purge ===
The most prolific period of executions occurred during the Great Purge, from 1936 to 1938.

The Central Committee Plenum passed a resolution in 1935 declaring an end to the purges of 1933. Sergey Kirov, leader of the Leningrad section of the Communist party, was murdered in 1934. In response, Stalin's Great Purge saw one third of the Communist party executed or sentenced to work in labor camps. Stalin induced terror among his own party and justified it with Marxist principles. Victims of the Great Purge were placed in a losing scenario regardless of what view they took. They were required to confess their transgressions towards the party and name accomplices. Although most were innocent, many chose to name accomplices either in hopes of gaining freedom or just to stop their torture by interrogators, which was ubiquitous at the time. The prisoner most often was still punished the same whether they denied their crimes, admitted them and provided no accomplices, or admitted them and provided accomplices. It made little difference as to their fate. This can be described as a one-shot, n-person prisoner's dilemma.

The Great Purge was no less perilous for those few foreigners who attempted to assimilate into Soviet culture. In one piece of literature, the author recalls a Soviet general describing the Great Purges as "difficult years to understand" for citizens and foreigners alike. These foreigners were treated much the same as Soviet ethnic minorities, and they were thought to be potential threats in the impending war. Germans, Poles, Finns, and other westerners were shown the same fate the bourgeoisie had been dealt following the end of New Economic Policy. Punishments ranged from eviction and relocation to summary execution.

=== 1950s ===
Following Stalin's death in 1953, purges as systematic campaigns of expulsion from the party ended; thereafter, the center's political control was exerted instead mainly through loss of party membership and its attendant nomenklatura privileges, which effectively downgraded one's opportunities in society – see Trade unions in the Soviet Union § Role in the Soviet class system, chekism, and party rule. Recalcitrant cases could be reduced to nonpersons via involuntary commitment to a psychiatric institution.

== Motivations ==
Conquest and Pipes emphasized the importance of Stalin's personality. Robert Conquest suggested that Stalin deliberately orchestrated mass repression to eliminate real and imaginary enemies to secure its regime. Pipes claimed that violence is rooted in the Bolshevik ideology - the effort to enforce ideology and economic system in which prices are set by the government is doomed to create a ruthless dictatorship.

Authors like Getty and Fitzpatrick emphasized the escalating role of the bureaucracy. Getty asserted that local officials, not just Stalin, drove much of the escalation. Fitzpatrick asserted that ordinary people and bureaucrats used denunciations to amplify the repression.

Authors like Khlevniuk and Kotkin presented a hybrid approach - the integration of Stalin's personality and the role of the bureaucracy. They claimed that Stalin was the engine, but he operated through institutions that amplified repression due to state fears from war, sabotage, and instability.

== See also ==
- Bibliography of Stalinism and the Soviet Union
- Case of Trotskyist Anti-Soviet Military Organization
- Moscow Trials
- Political repression in the Soviet Union
- Purge of the Red Army in 1941
- Racism in the Soviet Union

== Literature ==
- Arzyutov, Dmitry. "Early Years of Visual Anthropology in the Soviet Arctic". tandfonline.
- Ganin A. V. "Everyday life of the General Staffists under Lenin and Trotsky". M., 2016.
- Ganin A. V. "In the Shadow of 'Spring'. Former officers under repression of the early 1930s", Homeland. 2014. No. 6. pp. 95–101.
- Ganin A. V. "Gambit Monighetti. The incredible adventures of the 'Italian' in Russia", Homeland. 2011. No. 10. pp. 122–125.
- Ganin A. V. "Archive and investigation of the military scientist A. A. Svechin, 1931–1932", Part 2. Bulletin of the Archivist. 2014. No. 126. pp. 260–272
- Ganin A. V. "Archive and investigation of the military scientist A. A. Svechin, 1931–1932", Part 3. Bulletin of the Archivist. 2014. No. 127. pp. 261–291.
- Bliznichenko S. S., Lazarev S. E. "'Anti-Soviet conspiracy' at the Naval Academy (1930–1932)" Bulletin of the Ural Branch of the Russian Academy of Sciences. 2012. Vol. 3 (41). pp. 118–124.
- Lazarev S. E. "Military-political academy in the 1930s" Scientific reports of Belgorod State University, Part 8. 2013. Vol. 26, No. 151. pp. 140–149.
- Bliznichenko S. S., Lazarev S. E. "Repression at the F. E. Dzerzhinsky Naval Engineering School in the 1930s". Recent History of Russia. 2014. Vol. 1 (9). pp. 124–139.
