= Deadlock =

Deadlock commonly refers to:

- Deadlock (computer science), a situation where two or more processes are each waiting for the other to take action
- Deadlock (locksmithing) or deadbolt, a physical door locking mechanism
- Political deadlock or gridlock, a situation of difficulty passing laws that satisfy the needs of the people
- Negotiation deadlock or an impasse, a situation where two sides bargaining cannot reach an agreement
- Tie (draw), in competitive sports, identical or inconclusive results

Deadlock or deadlocked may also refer to:

== Media ==
=== Literature ===
- Deadlock (novel), a detective novel by Sara Paretsky
- Deadlocked (novel), a Sookie Stackhouse novel by Charlaine Harris
- Deadlock, a character in ABC Warriors

=== Film ===
- Deadlock (1931 film), a British crime film featuring Stewart Rome, Marjorie Hume and Warwick Ward
- Deadlock (1943 film), a British crime film starring John Slater
- Deadlock (1970 film), a West German Western starring Mario Adorf
- Deadlock (2021 film), an American action thriller starring Bruce Willis

=== Television ===
- The Bold Ones: The Protectors, also known as Deadlock, a 1969–1970 American crime drama television series
- Deadlock (TV series), a 2018 Australian TV series starring Thomas Weatherall
- "Deadlock" (Battlestar Galactica), a 2009 episode
- "Deadlock" (The Chelsea Detective), a 2025 episode
- "Deadlock" (Star Trek: Voyager), a 1996 episode
- "Deadlock" (VisionQuest), an episode of the television miniseries VisionQuest

=== Music ===
- Deadlock (band), a German melodic death metal band
- Deadlock (EP), by Xdinary Heroes, 2023
- "Deadlock", a song by Can from Soundtracks, 1970

=== Video games ===
- Battlestar Galactica Deadlock, a 2017 turn-based strategy game
- Deadlock, a playable character in Valorant
- Deadlock (video game), an upcoming game by Valve
- Deadlock: Planetary Conquest, a computer game by Accolade
- Ratchet: Deadlocked, a game in the Ratchet & Clank series by Insomniac Games
- Deadlocked, the 20th main level in Geometry Dash

== Other uses ==
- Deadlocked jury or hung jury, one that cannot agree upon a verdict
- Deadlock (game theory), a type of game in game theory, where the action that is mutually most beneficial is also dominant
- Deadlock Pro-Wrestling, a wrestling company founded in 2021

== See also ==
- Deadloch, an Australian comedy television series premiered 2023
- Deathlock (disambiguation)
- Dreadlock
- Impasse
- Gridlock
