= Paranoid algorithm =

Algorithm in game theory

In combinatorial game theory, the paranoid algorithm is a game tree search algorithm designed to analyze multi-player games using a two-player adversarial framework. The algorithm assumes all opponents form a coalition to minimize the focal player’s payoff, transforming an n-player non-zero-sum game into a zero-sum game between the focal player and the coalition.

The paranoid algorithm significantly improves upon the max^{n} algorithm by enabling the use of alpha-beta pruning and other minimax-based optimization techniques that are less effective in standard multi-player game analysis. By treating opponents as a unified adversary whose payoff is the opposite of the focal player’s payoff, the algorithm can apply branch and bound techniques and achieve substantial performance improvements over traditional multi-player algorithms.

While the paranoid assumption may not accurately reflect the true strategic interactions in all multi-player scenarios—where players typically optimize their own payoffs—the algorithm has proven effective in practice for artificial intelligence applications in board games and other combinatorial multi-player games. The algorithm is particularly valuable in computer game AI where computational efficiency is crucial and the simplified opponent model provides adequate performance for real-time applications.

== See also ==
- Maxn algorithm
- Minimax algorithm
