= List of characters in the Jean le Flambeur series =

This is a list of characters in the Jean le Flambeur series. The science fiction series by Hannu Rajaniemi currently consists of the novels The Quantum Thief, The Fractal Prince, and The Causal Angel.

== Jean le Flambeur ==
Jean le Flambeur (flambeur, French, "big-time gambler") is the protagonist of The Quantum Thief and The Fractal Prince. Events narrated from his point of view as Jean le Flambeur are in the first person, while all other points of view in the novels are narrated in the third person, including those in which Jean assumes another name, identity or disguise. In his identity as Jean le Flambeur, he prefers to wear a white shirt and velvet jacket, and sometimes sports blue shades.

At the start of The Quantum Thief, he is imprisoned in the Dilemma Prison, a Sobornost prison located in the Neptunian Trojan belt, but is rescued by Mieli at the behest of Josephine Pellegrini, and tasked to undertake another heist. Clues from his memories lead them to Oubliette, a Moving City of Mars.

=== Paul Sernine ===
As Paul Sernine (a pseudonym and an anagram of Arsene Lupin, assumed in the Maurice Leblanc novel 813), Jean assumed the identity of an architect in order to hide his loot in the Oubliette. Jean had hoped that he could cast off his prior life as a thief and settle down in the Oubliette with Raymonde, his Oubliette lover. The Interlude chapters in The Quantum Thief with names taken from the nine Dignities are flashbacks to the events of the Paul Sernine era, and each of the main Oubliette characters in those Interlude chapters has a customized Watch carved with the corresponding Dignity. These chapters describe Jean's hope to cast off his past as Paul Sernine, his plan to do so and his subsequent departure from Mars, but in Xuexue's chapter, some backstory for how the solar system became post-human is introduced.

=== Jean le Roi ===
The events in The Quantum Thief are partly due to Jean's quest to retrieve his memories, and partly due to the manipulations, via gevulot, of Jean le Roi, who is stated by Jean to bear a very close resemblance to himself. In fact, it is stated outright in The Fractal Prince that Jean le Roi is actually another version of Jean le Flambeur.

It appears that Jean le Roi was another version of Jean that was shipped out to the Oubliette as one of the initial prisoners, and that he had later risen after the prisoners' rebellion to become King of the Oubliette and, after the Revolution, the Cryptarch of the Oubliette. Jean le Roi claimed that he and Jean le Flambeur were cellmates at Sante Prison on Earth, but this is doubted by the latter, and le Roi then claimed that they were cellmates "after a fashion."

After Paul Sernine decided to leave Mars, Jean le Roi hooked up with Raymonde and fathered Isidore Beautrelet, while somehow convincing everyone that the child was Sernine's. At the end of The Quantum Thief, Jean le Roi is imprisoned in a Dilemma Prison brought about by the release of an Archon by Jean le Flambeur, but not before passing on the keys of the Cryptarch to Isidore, who used it to calm the splintered Oubliette population via the Voice.

=== The Flower Thief ===
Jean is sometimes described as the flower thief. This may be an allusion to his charisma, but he is also known to sometimes wear a flower on the lapel of his jacket.

== Mieli ==
Mieli (Finnish, "mind") is an Oortian warrior—"so battle-ready she has a fusion reactor embedded in her thigh"—and the daughter of Karhu ("bear; ursa") of the Hiljainen Koto ("quiet home"). She is bonded to serve the Sobornost Founder, Josephine Pellegrini, after losing her lover in Venus during the creation of a singularity and believing that Pellegrini will restore her lover back to her.

In The Quantum Thief, Mieli is tasked to rescue Jean le Flambeur from the Dilemma Prison. She is ambivalent about her task, as she despises thieves but is ordered to help one. Her honor leads to occasional conflicts with Jean, but helped her to secure the tzadikkim's assistance when Jean's persuasion failed to work on the latter. She proves to be a skilled warrior and is crucial in extricating Jean from several dangerous situations. A bond between her and Jean soon develops, to the extent that she gives Pellegrini the right to make gogols of her (i.e. clone her, thus sacrificing her uniqueness) in exchange for permission to rescue Jean le Flambeur and the Oubliette from certain doom.

In The Fractal Prince, Mieli has become more ambivalent about her task. Her loyalty to Pellegrini is tested when Jean's actions repeatedly endanger both her and her ship. More of her backstory is revealed through flashbacks, including the story of how she came to lose her lover, Sydän ("heart").

=== Oortians ===
The Oortians are a humanoid race from the Oort cloud. Their culture, as revealed by Mieli, is based on Finnish culture, as the Oortian colonies were presumably seeded by Finnish refugees from Earth. Mieli's name is Finnish, as is that of her lost lover, Sydän. Also, Jean makes references to the Oortian deities Kuutar and Ilmatar: both appear in the Kalevala, the former being the Moon spirit, the latter the air spirit. Oortians appear to have functional wings, as Mieli and Sydän are portrayed to have them.

=== Perhonen ===
Perhonen (Finnish, "butterfly") is a sentient Oortian spidership. She has a flirtatious personality and often fills the inside of the ship with butterfly avatars. She was sung from the alinen by Mieli.

=== Sydän ===
Sydän (Finnish, "heart") is an Oortian woman and the lost lover of Mieli. Mieli treasures a jewel of Sydän's that she managed to hold on to before Sydän was lost, and is very protective of it.

In The Quantum Thief, it is implied that she is under the influence of the Sobornost, and that Mieli is bound to serve Pellegrini in the hope of being reunited with her. She appears to Mieli in the Dilemma Prison as a dream memory, which was supplied by Pellegrini to alleviate Mieli's ordeal.

In The Fractal Prince, the story of how Mieli and Sydän became lovers and were then separated in Venus is revealed. Sydän was driven by a desire to visit the Inner System and later revealed that she desired immortality, instead of going into the alinen like the other Oortians.

In The Causal Angel, its revealed/implied that Sydän was actually a creation of Josephine Pelligrini's, designed to entice and seduce Mieli to help bring her closer to Josephine so she could use her to access the Kaminari Jewel.

== The Sobornost ==
The Sobornost (etymology) are a collective of entities who command millions, if not billions, of gogols and thereby have god-like powers over them and their environments. The arc of the Jean le Flambeur series appears to revolve around an emerging conflict amongst certain high-ranking members of the Sobornost, known as the Founders.

The Founders were humans that gained power after the massive mind uploadings and thereby acquired individual command of a large number of gogols. The faces of seven Founders are carved into the Sobornost ships that carry the guberniyas and raions. Known Founders include Matjek Chen, Josephine Pellegrini, the Engineer-of-Souls (a.k.a. "Sasha"), the twins Hsien-ku, Vasilev, Sumanguru and Chitragupta.

A copyclan is the collection of gogols commanded by a Sobornost entity that are its clones. Note that the entity need not be a Founder. A gogol that is in a copyclan of a Founder is referred to by the uncapitalized name of the Founder, so that a "pellegrini" is a copy of Josephine Pellegrini, and so on.

The Sobornost were, and possibly still are, at war with the Zoku. The most recent war was the Protocol War, in which Jupiter was destroyed in the event known as the Spike.

=== All-Defector ===
The All-Defector is a purported glitch in the Dilemma Prison that appears to prisoners as themselves. This gogol always defects, hence the name. In the epilogue of The Quantum Thief, it is revealed that three gogols escaped from the Dilemma Prison: Jean le Flambeur, Mieli and the All-Defector, which Sasha states to be a creation of the Archons. This fact plays an important role in the events of The Fractal Prince.

=== Archons ===
The Archons (etymology) are the builders and wardens of Dilemma Prisons. They were created by the Engineer-of-Souls to provide prisons for the Sobornost. They are nanomachines motivated to create Dilemma Prisons to override the "old ugly physics" of the real world with the physics in the Dilemma Prison. Hence, they will convert any structure that is not a Dilemma Prison into one.

But they are also entities that provide computational analysis. They are mentioned as providing a list of possible battle outcomes for the Sumanguru gogol during the Battle of the String.

They are not Dragons, so therefore are based on edited human gogols (as all other Sobornost tech).

=== Matjek Chen ===
Matjek Chen is a Sobornost Founder and considered to be the Lord of the Inner System, if not the whole solar system. He made his first appearance in the series in the epilogue, The Hunter, of The Quantum Thief. Jean mentions in The Quantum Thief that when they were humans, he used to go drinking with Chen.

In The Fractal Prince, Chen's role in the story is heightened, as the backstory of his past interactions with Josephine Pellegrini and Jean le Flambeur is explored in greater detail in the many flashbacks, presented in the novel as stories within stories. It is revealed that the Great Common Task originated from him as a goal for the Sobornost. He is also portrayed in the flashbacks as a precocious boy with great technical prowess.

=== Engineer-of-Souls ===
The Engineer-of-Souls, called Sasha by Josephine Pellegrini, is a Sobornost Founder who specializes in cultivating new types of minds inside his Guberniya in his "garden of souls", hence the title.

His creations include the Archons, which are used to take care of criminals in the Dilemma Prison, the Dragons (although this has also been attributed to Chen) and the Hunter, which was created in the events of the eponymous chapter of The Quantum Thief at the behest of Pellegrini, presumably to hunt down Jean le Flambeur.

In his prior life as a human, he studied at the University of Minsk and had romantic feelings for Pellegrini.

=== Chitragupta ===
Chitragupta is a Sobornost Founder. Not much known about him, likely is mystic and mathematician.

=== Hsien-ku ===
Hsien-ku are twins who are also Sobornost Founders. They are involved in a project on Earth that has a historical objective. Thus, they run a lot of ancestor virs.

In The Fractal Prince, they sent a sumanguru to investigate the murder of Councilwoman Alile Soarez in Sirr.

=== Joséphine Pellegrini ===
Joséphine Pellegrini (namesake of the Countess of Cagliostro in the Arsene Lupin stories) is a Sobornost Founder and the employer of Mieli. She instigated the release of Jean from prison in The Quantum Thief, for reasons initially unknown, but it is revealed in the epilogue of the same novel that she is under threat from the other Founders and sees in Jean a potential weapon against her peers. It is hinted in The Quantum Thief that she and Jean shared a complicated past relationship, one that has both professional and romantic components, and this is revealed in greater detail in The Fractal Prince.

In The Quantum Thief, the "pellegrini" is initially portrayed as a mysterious entity of the Sobornost, who wields god-like powers over Jean and Mieli. She has employed Mieli to free Jean from his prison for some unknown purpose. This apparently entails recovering Jean's lost memories, some of which are hidden in the Martian Moving City of Oubliette. As the story progresses, the "pellegrini" reveals, using Mieli's body as a mouthpiece, that she had an elaborate history with Jean, having possibly been both a mentor and a lover. At the end of the novel, the character of Joséphine Pellegrini is introduced as a Sobornost Founder.

In The Fractal Prince, Jean has also realized the identity of the "pellegrini," including the fact that she was his employer before he was caught and sent to the Dilemma Prison. Several flashbacks establish the circumstances of Jean's capture and the nature of his relation with Pellegrini. Mieli's story, particularly how she came to be under the employ of Pellegrini, is also detailed in The Fractal Prince.

In Mieli's zoku Realm, in "The Causal Angel," the witch Yuki-Onna, a creature from Japanese myth, represents the pellegrini.

=== Sumanguru ===
Sumanguru (etymology) is a Sobornost Founder and a warmind. As a human, he is said to have escaped a black box upload camp (perhaps similar to the one in the Ordos Desert, where Xuexue was stationed) when he was eleven, became a Fedorovist leader in Central Africa and single-handedly wiped out gogol trade there.

In The Fractal Prince, it is revealed that he is the Sobornost warmind trapped inside the Schrödinger's Box that Jean le Flambeur has stolen from the Zoku, after Jean used a Realmgate in a Zoku router to enter the Realm in the Box. Both Sumanguru and Jean appear to remember that it was Matjek Chen who betrayed Sumanguru, and Jean attempted to use this memory to lure Sumanguru out of the zoku Realm with the promise of revenge on Chen. Nevertheless, Sumanguru had become angry with Jean for letting him be trapped in the Box and decided not to cooperate. Unfortunately, Jean had a firmament vir running on Oortian hardware (the ship Perhonen) and Sobornost software, and so was able to trap Sumanguru's Founder Code.

=== Vasilev ===
Anton Vasilev is a Sobornost Founder. His physical appearance is described as that of a teenager who is "blond and remarkably handsome, with regular Slavic features," around 15 years old.

His copyclan is apparently behind the gogol piracy operation on the Oubliette, as Jean and Mieli had to negotiate with Vasilevs to gain the technology needed to hack the Oubliette gevulot. Vasilevs engaged in gogol piracy are known to be very vicious when they attack their victims, and will self-destruct when apprehended by the authorities.

In "The Causal Angel", Josephine Pellegrini reveals that Anton Vasilev was recruited into the Founders to serve as their public face and endorser. She describes him as "a virtual popstar, a media cyborg, worshipped by millions." It is also revealed that Pellegrini regretted the method by which she recruited Vasilev, claiming she "left him with a wound that never healed," and it is implied that this is the source of his animosity towards her.

== The Oubliette ==
=== Isidore Beautrelet ===
Isidore Beautrelet (the namesake of the boy detective in Maurice Leblanc's Arsène Lupin novel, The Hollow Needle) is a student of architecture and an amateur detective. He is only ten Martian years old when he attracts unwelcome fame after solving a gogol piracy case that was brought to his attention by The Gentleman. This fame brings him to the attention of the millenniaire, Christian Unruh, who summons him to solve the mystery of the impossible appearance of a note at his residence.

His investigations eventually lead to astonishing revelations, not just about his past, but the Oubliette's as well. Specifically, he learns that the Oubliette is a panopticon and that the Revolution was a lie, perpetuated by the zoku colony to sugar-coat the Oubliette's history as the posthuman version of Australia. (The latter was also discovered by Unruh, a fact that shocked him greatly and led to his choice of an early Quiet.) He also realizes that gevulot is not as secure as people thought, but that a master key exists. It turns out that Jean le Roi holds the master key, being the Cryptarch and former King of the Oubliette, and that he is also the father of Isidore, something confirmed by Jean le Flambeur after Isidore's initial misapprehension that Jean le Flambeur was his actual father.

At the end of The Quantum Thief, Isidore is the de facto Cryptarch of the Oubliette, having received the master key to gevulot from Jean le Roi. However, it is also hinted that he takes after Jean le Flambeur, not only in his choice of studying architecture at university (Jean, as Paul Sernine, was apparently an accomplished architect), but also in his successful theft of Jean's Watch during their farewell.

=== Dignities of God ===
The nine Dignities of God are nine Watches, custom-made by Paul Sernine (a.k.a. Jean le Flambeur) and given to nine Oubliette citizens whom he considered to be his friends. They form the price if ever Jean le Flambeur were to claim the loot he locked in the memory palace: to claim it, he must fire a revolver nine times, each time draining one Watch of its Time and sending one of his friends to an irreversible Quiet.

The known Dignities (chapter names) and their owners are:

- Goodness: Xuexue in the robot garden, a former uploader at the Iridescent Gateway of Heaven, an upload camp in the Ordos desert.
- Will: Isaac the rabbi and drinking buddy, who gave Paul Sernine the idea to lock up his toys.
- Wisdom: Bathilde, the patron of Sernine's work, Hallway of Birth and Death.
- Truth: Marcel the artist, and the story of how his partner, Owl Boy, was hurt in the Spike.
- Virtue: Gilbertine Shalbatana, who carries the Box in her exomemory.

=== Isaac ===
Isaac is a rabbi and a drinking buddy of Paul Sernine. He gave Sernine the idea to lock up his loot, which Sernine did by building the nine buildings in the Maze and fashioning the nine Dignities. When Raymonde shows Jean the revolver, she also tells him that Sernine had said to pass on the message that he should see Isaac, which Jean does.

=== Odette ===
Odette (etymology) is an assistant of Christian Unruh, the millenniaire. She approached Isidore to investigate a mystery for Unruh, the millenniaire, after Isidore made it into the newspapers upon solving a gogol piracy case.

=== Quiets ===
The Quiets are machines operated by the downloaded consciousnesses of Oubliette citizens who have entered the Quiet. They can be best described as servants who perform the menial and administrative tasks that keep the Oubliette society running. Examples include: Atlas Quiets who support the Moving City; Quiets defending Oubliette from the constant attacks of the phoboi plague; security and civil service Quiets, who are sometimes in humanoid form; and Quiets who assist the Resurrection Men.

=== Raymonde ===
Raymonde is a musician who was the lover of Paul Sernine (the pseudonym assumed by Jean le Flambeur when he was a citizen of the Oubliette). When Jean comes to look for her in the events of The Quantum Thief, she is composing an opera about the Revolution.

Raymonde believed that she was with Jean le Flambeur's child, not knowing that it was le Roi who fathered Isidore. In the 20 years (10 Martian years) after Paul Sernine left, she decided to take an early Quiet. After coming back from the Quiet, she disguises herself as the mysterious tzadik The Gentleman and mentors Isidore in his detective work, drawing his attention to a gogol piracy case at the start of The Quantum Thief.

=== Resurrection Men ===
The Resurrection Men are charged with implementing the resurrection laws in the Oubliette. As citizens of the Oubliette transit to the Quiet, their Noble bodies are collected by the Resurrection Men and stored until their time in the Quiet is complete, after which their consciousness is downloaded back into their bodies.

=== Tzadikkim ===
The tzadikkim (plural; singular tzadik, see Hebrew meaning) are a vigilante group formed by Oubliette citizens, out of concern for the gogol piracy that is plaguing the Oubliette. This may also be a reference to The Tsaddik of the Seven Wonders (1971), a Jewish-themed comic fantasy novel by Isidore Haiblum.

After their botched negotiations with the vasilevs in the Museum of Contemporary Art on the Oubliette, Mieli obtained some information about the identities of the tzadikkim from the vasilev mind she captured. This led her to barge in on the altercation between Jean le Flambeur and Raymonde in Raymonde's apartment.

When Jean and Mieli meet the tzadikkim in the Silence's kitchen in Montgolfiersville, there are six of them: The Silence (faceless dark blue mask, tall male), the Futurist (Mme Diaz, as Jean revealed; dresses in red, moves very quickly), the Rat King (male with a young high-pitched voice and a thick body), Cockatrice (blonde female in a red leotard and a Venetian-style mask, whom Jean would flirt with under normal circumstances), the Bishop (skull-faced tall male with bony knees) and the Gentleman (Raymonde).

=== Christian Unruh ===
Christian Unruh (possibly named after physicist W. G. Unruh, literally "restless" or "unquiet" in German, Unruh is also a technical term for a central part of mechanical watches) is a millenniaire, a person who is very rich in Time. When he first meets Isidore, he is about to organize a farewell party for himself, as he has elected to enter Quiet early. A mysterious note has appeared under impossible circumstances in his residence, announcing a gate-crasher to his party. After learning of Isidore's exploits, Unruh summons him to solve the mystery.

=== Xuexue ===
Xuexue is a citizen of the Oubliette. Her story gives an infodump of how mind uploading was carried out prior to events in The Quantum Thief.

In the Goodness chapter, she recalled to Paul Sernine how she would persuade parents in situations of distress (e.g. after suffering a natural disaster) into letting their children be uploaded. The children would then be led to an upload camp in the Ordos desert, called the Iridiscent Gateway of Heaven. There, they would be subjected to harsh training before being uploaded. Later, the Ordos desert operation was raided by drones, possibly on the orders of Matjek Chen, as revealed in The Fractal Prince. Fearing for her life, Xuexue uploaded herself.

Eventually, she ended up as a prisoner gogol of the Oubliette and, later, a citizen. When Paul Sernine found her, she loved to smile at the red robot in the garden.

== Sirr ==
Sirr is a city on Earth, which is now ravaged by rogue nanites or "wildcode." Wildcode is apparently nanotechnology that has somehow hybridized with the biosphere and poses a mortal danger to baseline humans and Sobornost bodies alike.

Most of the remnants of humanity on Earth live in Sirr and depend on the Seals, which are apparently produced by the Gomelez family, to protect themselves from the wildcode.

=== Abu Nuwas ===
Abu Nuwas (namesake) is a wealthy gogol merchant on Sirr. The thought-form of the jinn entwined to him is a serpent of fire. Cassar Gomelez sought his support in the vote on amending the Cry of Wrath Accords, in exchange for which Abu Nuwas asked for the chance to woo his daughter, Tawaddud Gomelez.

=== Alile Soarez ===
The death of Councilwoman Alile Soarez is the trigger for many events in The Fractal Prince. It threatens to weaken the Gomelez family's push for renegotiating the Cry of Wrath Accords with the Sobornost, and leads to the invitation of a sumanguru to investigate the death. In the course of the investigation, Tawaddud is led to realize some frightening truths.

=== The Aun ===
In The Fractal Prince, the Aun are strange entities of Sirr who hold god-like powers over the wildcode and demanded true stories from those who seek boons from them.

As Cassar Gomelez recalls, the Aun were four: The Chimney Princess, The Green Soldier, The Lightkraken and The Flower Prince. They use to live as ghosts and shadows in the minds of humans, painfully copied from one host to another, and using promises of immortality to ensure that they would be remembered. But when immortality became more real, they were in danger of dying out, until someone came to set them free: the Prince of Stories.

When Sirr fell, they appeared to Zoto Gomelez, the grandfather of Cassar, and asked if he and his people would like to be turned into stories. Zoto had a wife and children, however, so he chose to ask the Aun to protect them from the wildcode, in return for letting the Aun see the world through human eyes and offering them worship. This they did, by teaching Zoto how to use Secret Names to make Seals to be used as armour against the wildcode.

However, throughout The Fractal Prince, only three of the four are regularly seen. The Flower Prince is missing and the Aun do not seem to know why.

=== The Axolotl ===
The Axolotl was a lover of Tawaddud Gomelez and is reputed to be the father of the body thieves.

As a human, his original name was Zaybak. He remembers his days as a human: taking the train, which smelled of people, fast food and coffee. After the Collapse, he learned to adjust to his bodiless life and make himself a dream-train. One day, in that train, he met the Flower Prince, who offered to tell him the secret of stealing a human body. Zaybak accepted and caused a wave of body thefts and debauchery in Sirr, an event known to Tawaddud as the "night of the ghuls."

The name, "axolotl," may be a reference to a Julio Cortázar short story entitled "Axolotl" in his 1956 collection Final del juego, about a man who trades minds with an axolotl in an aquarium.

=== Cassar Gomelez ===
Cassar Gomelez (the namesake of a character in The Manuscript Found in Saragossa by Jan Potocki) is the father of Dunyazad and Tawaddud and a member of the Sirr Council.

=== Dunyazad Gomelez ===
Dunyazad Gomelez (being the namesake of the sister of Scheherazade) is a daughter of Cassar Gomelez and the sister of Tawaddud. There is a rivalry between her and her sister, as she is a respected muhtasib trusted by her father, while Tawaddud is the black sheep of the family.

=== Emina ===
Emina (possibly in reference to one of the two Moorish princesses in The Manuscript Found in Saragossa) is an acquaintance of Tawaddud Gomelez who works in the Palace of Dreams. When Tawaddud arrives at the Palace with the sumanguru, Emina initially reprimands Tawaddud for having the nerve to return after causing trouble at the Palace, due to the Repentants coming for Tawaddud, but later relents and agrees to take Tawaddud to see Kafur to find the Axolotl.

=== Kafur ===
Kafur taught Tawaddud Gomelez how to entwine with jinni, during the period when Tawaddud ran away from her family.

=== Masrurs ===
The masrurs are a jinni guerilla movement who have been attacking soul trains in protest against the modification of the Cry of Wrath Accords, proposed by Councilman Gomelez. This would enable Sobornost machines to harvest gogols from the wildcode desert, something which the Cry of Wrath had previously stopped the Sobornost from doing.

=== Mr Sen ===
Mr Sen is a jinn and a member of the Council.

=== Tawaddud Gomelez ===
Tawaddud Gomelez (being the namesake of the knowledgeable Tawaddud in the story "Abu al-Husn and His Slave-Girl Tawaddud") is a daughter of Cassar Gomelez. She is considered to be the black sheep of her family, having abandoned her mutalibun husband, Veyraz, for the City of the Dead and consorted with the father of body thieves, the Axolotl, for which she was branded the "lover of monsters" by her father and gained a reputation as the "Axolotl's whore."

=== Veyraz ===
Veyraz ibn' Ad, of House Uzeda, was the husband of Tawaddud Gomelez, and substantially older than Tawaddud. Cassar Gomelez gave Tawaddud to be his wife when she was very young. Tawaddud was his second wife, the first having become possessed and gone to the City of the Dead to live as a ghul.

=== Zoto Gomelez ===
Zoto Gomelez ("Zoto" being the name of another character from The Manuscript Found in Saragossa) is the great-grandfather of Tawaddud and Dunyazad Gomelez. He made a pact with the Aun so that the remaining humans on Earth could be protected from the wildcode.

== The Zoku ==
The Zoku (Japanese, "clan") are a transhuman faction who have a colony on the Oubliette and a city on Saturn. Jupiter used to be a home for them before the Spike happened, in which Jupiter was destroyed. The Oubliette colony was founded by the Jovian Zoku refugees.

Their origins can be traced back to gamer communities from before the beginning of the massive mind uploading, and they hold Tangleparties, which can be thought of as a quantum version of LAN parties, to remember who they were.

Unlike the Sobornost, whose Great Common Task demanded the rewriting of the laws of the universe to eliminate death (epitomized, according to the in-universe exposition, by the no-cloning theorem), the Zoku embraces quantum reality, which makes them "quantum filth" in the eyes of some Sobornost entities. The Protocol War was a conflict between the Sobornost and the Zoku over precisely this difference.

=== Pixil ===
Pixil (possibly a corruption of the word "pixel") is the zoku girlfriend of Isidore. She lives in the zoku colony on the Oubliette. She reveals the identity of the Gentleman to Isidore, which leads him to confront Raymonde and thereby piece together what Jean, as Paul Sernine, had done in the past and is about to do soon. She decides to help Isidore save the Oubliette, against the wishes of the zoku colony, which prompted the zoku colony to come out in full force against the phoboi tide that threatened the Oubliette.

=== Barbicane ===
Barbicane is Elder of the Gun Club Zoku, which oversees the creation and preservation of weapons and ships. Barbicane made the spaceship Leblanc for Jean le Flambeur and has kept it secured in the Gun Club since le Flambeur's imprisonment in the Dilema Prison. This character shares a name Impey Barbicane who is president of the Baltimore Gun Club in Jules Verne's From the Earth to the Moon.
