= Deathlock =

Deathlock may refer to:

- Deathlok, several fictional characters from Marvel Comics works
- Dethklok, a fictional heavy metal band
- Deadlock (disambiguation)
