= Summerland (Rajaniemi novel) =

2018 novel by Hannu Rajaniemi

- Author: Hannu Rajaniemi
- Audio read by: Antonia Beamish
- Cover artist: Jeffrey Alan Love
- Language: English
- Genre: Alternate history speculative fiction
- Publisher: Tor Books
- Publication date: June 26, 2018
- Pages: 304
- ISBN: 1250178924

Summerland is a 2018 speculative fiction novel by Hannu Rajaniemi published by Tor Books. Rajamiemi's first novel since his acclaimed Jean Le Flambeur series, Summerland is an espionage procedural involving the spies of the British Empire and Soviet Union contending in an alternate history with fantastical elements of the afterlife. It received mixed reviews, with critics praising its premise but finding the characters underwritten and the plot unfulfilling.

== Plot ==
Set in an alternate history 1938 at the outbreak of the Spanish Civil War, Summerland is a standalone espionage procedural, pitting the Fascist-supporting British Empire against the republic-supporting Soviet Union. The plot follows a British spy network's efforts against their Soviet counterparts, interacting with a supernatural plane of existence containing an exclusive afterlife, "Summerland", and a Soviet hive mind of the dead controlled by the spirit of Lenin.

== Release ==
Summerland was Rajaniemi's first novel since his highly regarded Jean Le Flambeur science fiction series, and so was hotly anticipated. Its release was announced in 2013 as part of a slate of upcoming books Gollancz had secured for a six-figure fee. The delay of its release to 2018 was speculated by Reactor Magazine to have been tied to the departure from Gollancz of Simon Spanton, who had been an advocate of Rajaniemi's work. An audiobook version, narrated by Antonia Beamish, was released simultaneously with the hardback.

== Reception ==
Ahead of its release, The Verge listed it as one of 13 essential reads in science fiction and fantasy books. It was also included in the POLITICO 50 Reading List, compiled from 50 people the digital newspaper deemed to be "the smartest people in politics", as the nomination of conservative commentator Ben Shapiro.

In Locus, Gary K. Wolfe called it "as persuasive an example of Rajaniemi’s disciplined inventiveness as his better-known hard SF". In The Guardian, science fiction novelist Eric Brown compared it to le Carré, finding it impressively plotted. Reviewing the audiobook version for the Locus, Amy Goldschlager also made the spy connection, calling it "John Le Carré with dead people". Goldschlager contrasted the legibility of Summerland to Rajaniemi's comparatively convoluted science fiction novels, and complimented the "intriguing" premise, but found it unconvincing and ultimately unrewarding. Kirkus Reviews also found the novel less than the sum of its parts, deeming the living characters less substantial than the dead, and concluding that "the impressive and apposite details...often seem designed to obscure intractable flaws in the framework".
