= Steve Kuhn (disambiguation) =

Steve Kuhn or Steven Kuhn may refer to:

- Steve Kuhn, an American Jazz musician
- Steve Kuhn, founder of Major League Pickleball and DUPR
- Steven Kuhn, American logician and professor

== See also ==
- Steve Cohn, American lawyer
