= Steven Kuhn =

American logician

Steven Kuhn is an American philosophy professor at Georgetown University whose research focuses on logic, ethics and the philosophy of language.

== Career ==
Kuhn earned his undergraduate degree in mathematics from Johns Hopkins University and his Ph.D. from Stanford University. Prior to his position at Georgetown, he taught at the University of Michigan, UCLA and the University of Pennsylvania.

Kuhn is the author of the two-volume Many-sorted Modal Logics (1977) and contributed the article on the prisoner's dilemma to the Stanford Encyclopedia of Philosophy.

=== Moral philosophy and game theory ===
Kuhn has written extensively on the prisoner's dilemma. In his article 'Pure and Utilitarian Prisoner's dilemmas', he distinguishes between a 'pure' prisoner's dilemma and an impure prisoner's dilemma. A "pure dilemma" is defined when no mixed strategies improve outcomes over mutual cooperation; it's an "impure dilemma" when such strategies exist. This distinction is interesting since in the case of an "impure dilemma", individuals who do not consistently follow moral rules can gain an advantage over individuals who do. Therefore, the possibility that moral behaviour requires randomization of one's actions arises.

In his subsequent paper "The Impure Game: Feasible Payoffs and Possible Generalizations", Kuhn attempts to extend the concept of impurity to other games, such as the Chicken Game and the Battle of the Sexes.

Kuhn has pointed out two obstacles towards the synthesis between game theory and ethics first suggested by R. B. Braithwaite. Firstly, he argues that there is a lack of careful consideration in choosing the most suitable game theoretic framework and in interpreting the technical tools used in these discussions. Second, he cites some challenging examples from game theory.

Kuhn then points out that even in a pure dilemma, if utilities are transferable (i.e., one can compensate the other), universal cooperation might not be the optimal collective strategy. The scenario with possible utility transfers that benefit both players is termed a "nonutilitarian dilemma," and "utilitarian dilemma" otherwise. These distinctions in the prisoner's dilemma have practical implications, such as in the formulation of moral rules or the structuring of legal contracts, where the type of dilemma can influence recommended or optimal behaviors.

In "The Pragmatics of Tense", Kuhn argues applies a framework inspired by Montague's to analyze the English tense system, suggesting that shared knowledge impacts the use of tenses, hence the use of the word pragmatics. This principle, Kuhn argues, could also apply to other linguistic elements such as pronouns and ambiguity.

He has 1084 citations and an h-index of 13 on Google Scholar.
