= Deadlock (game theory) =

Game with a dominant mutually most beneficial action

In game theory, Deadlock is a game where the action that is mutually most beneficial is also dominant. This provides a contrast to the Prisoner's Dilemma where the mutually most beneficial action is dominated. This makes Deadlock of rather less interest, since there is no conflict between self-interest and mutual benefit. On the other hand, deadlock game can also impact the economic behaviour and changes to equilibrium outcome in society.

== General definition ==
	C	D
c	a, b	c, d
d	e, f	g, h

Any game that satisfies the following two conditions constitutes a Deadlock game: (1) e>g>a>c and (2) d>h>b>f. These conditions require that d and D be dominant. (d, D) be of mutual benefit, and that one prefer one's opponent play c rather than d.

Like the Prisoner's Dilemma, this game has one unique Nash equilibrium: (d, D).

== Example ==
	C	D
c	1, 1	0, 3
d	3, 0	2, 2

In this deadlock game, if Player C and Player D cooperate, they will get a payoff of 1 for both of them. If they both defect, they will get a payoff of 2 for each. However, if Player C cooperates and Player D defects, then C gets a payoff of 0 and D gets a payoff of 3.

== Deadlock and social cooperation ==
Even though deadlock game can satisfy group and individual benefit at mean time, but it can be influenced by dynamic one-side-offer bargaining deadlock model. As a result, deadlock negotiation may happen for buyers. To deal with deadlock negotiation, three types of strategies are founded to break through deadlock and buyer's negotiation. Firstly, using power move to put a price on the status quo to create a win-win situation. Secondly, process move is used for overpowering the deadlock negotiation. Lastly, appreciative moves can help buyer to satisfy their own perspectives and lead to successful cooperation.

== External links and offline sources ==
- GameTheory.net
- C. Hauert: "Effects of space in 2 x 2 games". International Journal of Bifurcation and Chaos in Applied Sciences and Engineering 12 (2002) 1531–1548.
- Hans‐Ulrich Stark (August 3, 2010). "Dilemmas of partial cooperation". Evolution. 64 (8): 2458–2465. doi:10.1111/j.1558-5646.2010.00986.x. PMID 20199562. S2CID 205782687.
- Ilwoo Hwang (May 2018). "A Theory of Bargaining Deadlock". Games and Economic Behavior. 109: 501–522. doi:10.1016/j.geb.2018.02.002.
- Ayça Kaya; Kyungmin Kim (October 2018). "Trading Dynamics with Private Buyer Signals in the Market for Lemons". The Review of Economic Studies. 85 (4): 2318–2352. doi:10.1093/restud/rdy007.
