= Steve Cohen (author) =

American writer

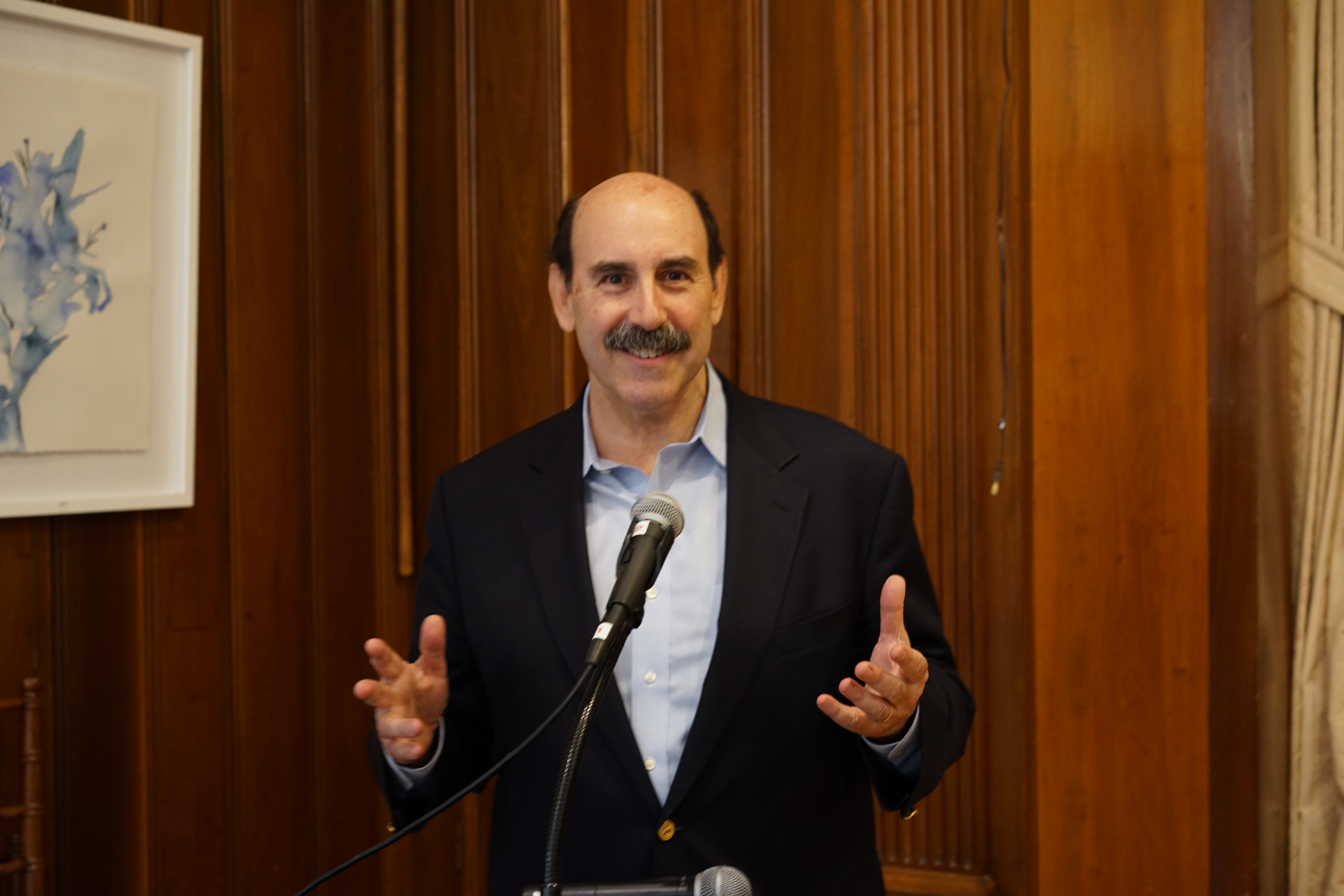
Steve Cohen, Guest Speaker at Princeton University

Steve Cohen is an American author and attorney. He is a founding partner of Pollock Cohen LLP.

His articles, mostly opinion pieces, have appeared in The New York Times, The Wall Street Journal, City Journal Time, and others. He is the author or co-author of six books. His early career included stints at Time and Scholastic. He co-chaired the Clinton White House literacy task force "Prescription for Reading Partnership," and was on the board the United States Naval Institute. At age 58 he went to law school, and is currently an attorney in New York City.

== Early life and education ==
Cohen grew up in Lynbrook, New York and was appointed to the United States Naval Academy in Annapolis by Congressman Allard Lowenstein. Cohen attended the academy for nearly three years, then transferred to Brown University under the G.I. Bill. He graduated in 1975, with a concentration in Public Policy. In 2013, he graduated from New York Law School, and is admitted to practice in New York.

== Career ==
Early in his career, Cohen worked for the Governor of Rhode Island, for the New York State Senate, and for several advertising agencies. He was also on Ronald Reagan's national campaign staff in the 1980 Presidential race, where he wrote and produced television commercials and print ads "Podium" and "No More".

For nearly seven years Cohen worked for Time Inc. where he held marketing positions.

Cohen spent two years as a vice president with Playboy, and won two Clio Awards for best radio and television advertising campaigns.

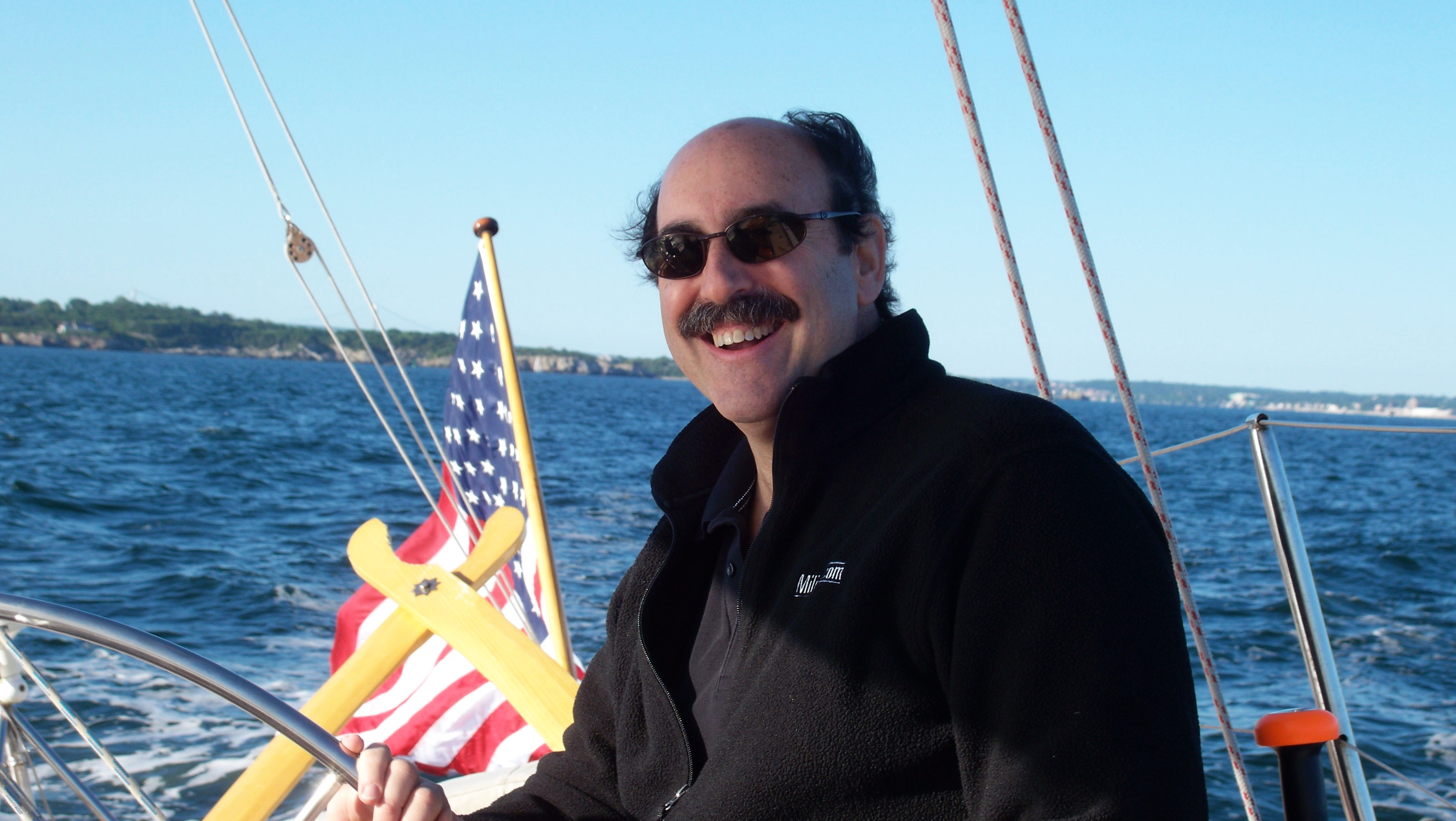
Steve Cohen's most used biography photo

For nine years Cohen was then a managing director at Scholastic, the children's publishing company. He was responsible for creating and managing several businesses including Parent & Child Magazine, the Parent Bookshelf, and the Everything You Always Wanted to Know About....(Kindergarten, First Grade, Second Grade) book series.

Cohen left Scholastic to become CEO of several internet start-ups including 4-to-14/Brainquest.com; Living Independently/Quietcare (sold to General Electric;) and MultiMedicus/The Child Health Guide – developed in cooperation with Harvard and Dartmouth Medical Schools.

Since 1983, Cohen has been an adjunct professor and NYU and Fordham.

== As a Contributing Author ==
Beginning in 1976, Steve began writing articles for magazines and newspapers. He has written – most on issues of public policy – for The New York Times, The Wall Street Journal, The New York Sun, The New York Observer, Bloomberg View, The Daily Beast, and others.

== Books ==
He has written or co-authored six books:

- Getting In!—with Paulo DeOliveira (Workman 1983)
- Getting to the Right Job – with Paulo DeOliveira (Workman 1987)
- Learn to Read Treasure Hunts – (Workman 1997)
- Parents Guide to the Best Family Videos – with Patty McCormick (St. Martins 1999)
- Next Stop Hollywood – (St. Martins 2007)
- Getting In – the Zinch Guide to Admissions and Financial Aid in the Digital Age – with Michael Muska, Paulo DeOliveira, and Anne Dwane (Wiley 2011)
