= Unscrupulous diner's dilemma =

Game theory dilemma

In game theory, the unscrupulous diner's dilemma (or just diner's dilemma) is an n-player prisoner's dilemma. The situation imagined is that several people go out to eat, and before ordering, they agree to split the cost equally between them. Each diner must now choose whether to order the costly or cheap dish. It is presupposed that the costlier dish is better than the cheaper, but not by enough to warrant paying the difference when eating alone. Each diner reasons that, by ordering the costlier dish, the extra cost to their own bill will be small, and thus the better dinner is worth the money. However, all diners having reasoned thus, they each end up paying for the costlier dish, which by assumption, is worse than had they each ordered the cheaper.

== Formal definition and equilibrium analysis ==
Let a represent the joy of eating the expensive meal, b the joy of eating the cheap meal, k is the cost of the expensive meal, l the cost of the cheap meal, and n the number of players. From the description above we have the following ordering $k-l>a-b$. Also, in order to make the game sufficiently similar to the Prisoner's dilemma we presume that one would prefer to order the expensive meal given others will help defray the cost, $a - \frac{1}{n}k > b - \frac{1}{n}l$

Consider an arbitrary set of strategies by a player's opponent. Let the total cost of the other players' meals be x. The cost of ordering the cheap meal is $\frac{1}{n}x + \frac{1}{n}l$ and the cost of ordering the expensive meal is $\frac{1}{n}x + \frac{1}{n}k$. So the utilities for each meal are $a - \frac{1}{n}x - \frac{1}{n}k$ for the expensive meal and $b - \frac{1}{n}x - \frac{1}{n}l$ for the cheaper meal. By assumption, the utility of ordering the expensive meal is higher. Remember that the choice of opponents' strategies was arbitrary and that the situation is symmetric. This proves that the expensive meal is strictly dominant and thus the unique Nash equilibrium.

If everyone orders the expensive meal all of the diners pay k and the utility of every player is $a-k$. On the other hand, if all the individuals had ordered the cheap meal, the utility of every player would have been $b-l$. Since by assumption $b-l>a-k$, everyone would be better off. This demonstrates the similarity between the diner's dilemma and the prisoner's dilemma. Like the prisoner's dilemma, everyone is worse off by playing the unique equilibrium than they would have been if they collectively pursued another strategy.

== Experimental evidence ==
Uri Gneezy, Ernan Haruvy, and Hadas Yafe (2004) tested these results in a field experiment. Groups of six diners faced different billing arrangements. In one arrangement the diners pay individually, in the second they split the bill evenly between themselves and in the third the meal is paid entirely by the experimenter. As predicted, the consumption is the smallest when the payment is individually made, the largest when the meal is free and in-between for the even split. In a fourth arrangement, each participant pays only one sixth of their individual meal and the experimenter pay the rest, to account for possible unselfishness and social considerations. There was no difference between the amount consumed by these groups and those splitting the total cost of the meal equally. As the private cost of increased consumption is the same for both treatments but splitting the cost imposes a burden on other group members, this indicates that participants did not take the welfare of others into account when making their choices. This contrasts to a large number of laboratory experiments where subjects face analytically similar choices but the context is more abstract.

== See also ==
- Tragedy of the commons
- Free-rider problem
- Abilene paradox
