= Optional prisoner's dilemma =

Extension of the prisoner's dilemma

The optional prisoner's dilemma (OPD) game models a situation of conflict involving two players in game theory. It can be seen as an extension of the standard prisoner's dilemma game, where players have the option to "reject the deal", that is, to abstain from playing the game. This type of game can be used as a model for a number of real world situations in which agents are afforded the third option of abstaining from a game interaction such as an election.

== Payoff matrix ==
The structure of the optional prisoner's dilemma can be generalized from the standard prisoner's dilemma game setting. In this way, suppose that the two players are represented by the colors, red and blue, and that each player chooses to "Cooperate", "Defect" or "Abstain".

The payoff matrix for the game is shown below:

Canonical OPD payoff matrix
	Cooperate	Defect	Abstain
Cooperate	R, R	S, T	L, L
Defect	T, S	P, P	L, L
Abstain	L, L	L, L	L, L

- If both players cooperate, they both receive the reward R for mutual cooperation.
- If both players defect, they both receive the punishment payoff P.
- If Blue defects while Red cooperates, then Blue receives the temptation payoff T, while Red receives the "sucker's" payoff, S.
- Similarly, if Blue cooperates while Red defects, then Blue receives the sucker's payoff S, while Red receives the temptation payoff T.
- If one or both players abstain, both receive the loner's payoff L.

The following condition must hold for the payoffs:

T > R > L > P > S
