= Minimum effort game =

In game theory, the minimum effort game or weakest link game is a game in which each person decides how much effort to put in and is rewarded based on the least amount of effort anyone puts in. It is assumed that the reward per unit of effort is greater than the cost per unit effort, otherwise there would be no reason to put in effort.

== Examples ==
- On an island, each person tries to build barriers to protect an island from flooding. Because even a single failed barriers causes the whole island to flood, the flood protection is determined by the weakest barrier.
- An airport ground crew must complete all their tasks before an airplane can take off. As a result, the time spent is based on the slowest member of the ground crew.

== Nash equilibria ==
If there are $n$ players, the set of effort levels is $A=\{1,...,K\}$, it costs each player $c$ dollars to put in one unit of effort, and each player is rewarded $b$ dollars for each unit of effort the laziest person puts in, then there are $K$ pure-strategy Nash equilibria, one for each $k\in A$, with each player putting in the same amount of effort $k$, because putting more effort costs more money without extra reward, and because putting less effort reduces the reward earned.

There are $\frac{K(K-1)}{2}$ non pure Nash equilibria, given as follows: each player chooses two effort levels $k < l$ and puts in $k$ units of effort with probability $\left (\frac{c}{b}\right )^{\frac{1}{n-1}}$ and $l$ units of effort with probability $1-\left (\frac{c}{b}\right )^{\frac{1}{n-1}}$.

== In practice ==
The amount of effort players put in depends on the amount of effort they think other players will put in. In addition, some players will put more effort than expected in an attempt to get others to put in more effort.
