= The Quantum Thief =

2010 novel by Hannu Rajeniemi

- First edition
- Author: Hannu Rajaniemi
- Cover artist: Chris Moore
- Language: English
- Genre: Science fiction
- Publisher: UK: Gollancz; US: Tor Books
- Publication date: 2010
- Publication place: United Kingdom
- Pages: 336
- ISBN: 0-575-08887-7 (hard) 0-575-08888-5 (paper)
- OCLC: 636911772
- Followed by: The Fractal Prince

The Quantum Thief is the debut science fiction novel by Finnish writer Hannu Rajaniemi and the first novel in a trilogy featuring the character of Jean le Flambeur; the sequels are The Fractal Prince (2012) and The Causal Angel (2014). The novel was published in Britain by Gollancz in 2010, and by Tor in 2011 in the US. It is a heist story, set in a futuristic Solar System, that features a protagonist modeled on Arsène Lupin, the gentleman thief of Maurice Leblanc.

The novel was nominated for the 2011 Locus Award for Best First Novel, and was second runner-up for the 2011 Campbell Memorial Award.

== Setting ==
Several centuries after the technological singularity largely destroyed Earth, various posthuman factions compete for dominance in the Solar System. Though sentient superintelligent AGI has never been successfully developed, civilization has been greatly transformed by the proliferation of Hansonian brain emulations (termed "gogols" in reference to Nikolai Gogol, and in particular his novel Dead Souls). An alliance of powerful gogol copies rule the inner system from computronium megastructures housing trillions of virtual minds, laboring to resurrect the dead in religious devotion to the philosophy of Nikolai Fedorov. This alliance, the Sobornost, has been in conflict with a community of quantum entangled minds who adhere to the "no-cloning" principle of quantum information theory, and so do not see the Sobornost's ultimate goal as resurrection, but death. Most of this community, the Zoku, was devastated when Jupiter was destroyed with a weaponized gravitational singularity.

Among the last remnants of near-baseline humanity exist on the mobile cities of Mars, where advanced cryptography and an obsessive privacy culture ensure that the Sobornost cannot upload their citizens' minds. The most notable of these cities is the Oubliette, where time is used as a currency. When a citizen's balance reaches zero their mind is transferred to a robotic body to serve the needs of the city for a set period, before being returned to their original body with a restored balance of time.

== Plot summary ==
Countless gogols of the legendary gentleman thief Jean Le Flambeur are trapped in a virtual Sobornost prison in orbit around Neptune, playing an iterated prisoner's dilemma until his mind learns to cooperate. A warrior from the Oort Cloud, which has been settled by Finnish colonists, successfully retrieves one of the Le Flambeur gogols and uploads it into a real-space body. Acting on behalf of a competing Sobornost authority, this Oortian, Mieli, ferries the thief to the Martian city known as The Oubliette, where he has stored his memories for later recovery. The two intend to recover his memories so that he may return to an operating capacity sufficient to serve his Sobornost benefactor in a theft and repay his liberation.

On the Oubliette, the young detective Isidore Beautrelet helps vigilantes catch Sobornost agents illicitly uploading human minds. These vigilantes are revealed to be in the service of a local colony of Zoku. Beautrelet is employed to investigate the arrival of Le Flambeur, and in the process becomes aware that the Oubliette's cryptographic security was always compromised. The memories of its citizens are fabrications, and the "King of Mars" long believed ousted in a revolution, still reigns behind the scenes. This King, who is another copy of Jean Le Flambeur, is defeated in the ensuing conflict. Le Flambeur fails to recover all of his memories, which he had locked with a quantum entangled revolver that required him to kill several of his old friends to open his stored memory. He and Mieli escape a liberated Mars having recovered only a mysterious "Schrödinger’s Box" from the Memory Palace.

== Themes ==
Themes central to The Quantum Thief are the unreliability and malleability of memory and the effects of extreme longevity on an individual's perspective and personality. Prisons, surveillance and control in society are also major themes.

In the book, the people living in the Oubliette society on Mars have two types of memory; in addition to a traditional, personal memory, there is the exomemory, which can be accessed by other people, from anywhere in the city. Memories about personal experiences can be stored in the exomemory and partitioned, with different levels of access granted to different people. These memories can be used, among other things, as an expedient form of communication.

The Oubliette society has an economy where time is used as currency. When an individual's time is expended, their consciousness is uploaded into a "Quiet". The Quiet are mute machine servants who maintain and protect the city. Although the quiet seem to have little interest in the world outside their occupations, they do seem to retain some traces of their former personalities and memories.

The conspiracy central to the plot involves the hidden rulers, called the "cryptarchs", manipulating and abusing the exomemory and through the citizens' transformations to quiet and back, the traditional memory as well. In the book, the Oubliette society is compared to a panopticon; a prison, where every action of the dwellers can be scrutinized.

== History and influences ==
The first chapter of The Quantum Thief was presented by Rajaniemi's literary agent, John Jarrold, to Gollancz as the basis for the three-book deal that was eventually secured. Rajaniemi has stated that he had "come up with an outline that had every single idea I could cram into it, because I wanted to be worthy of what had happened." The outline eventually expanded into three parts, and the first part became The Quantum Thief.

The novel's plot was inspired by one of Rajaniemi's favorite characters in fiction, Maurice Leblanc's gentleman thief Arsène Lupin, who operates on both sides of the law. What intrigued Rajaniemi were the cycles of redemption and relapse Lupin goes through as he tries to go straight, always falling short. Besides LeBlanc, Rajaniemi mentioned Roger Zelazny as a strong influence. Ian McDonald was the other science fiction author he mentioned as influential, plus Frances A.Yates's book The Art of Memory, for memory palaces.

In an interview, Rajaniemi said he wasn't trying to write the novel as hard science fiction: "For me, the more important consequence of having a scientific background is a degree of speculative rigour: trying hard to work out the consequences of the assumptions one begins with."

== Reception ==
The novel has received generally positive reviews. Gary K. Wolfe writes in his Locus review that Rajaniemi has "spectacularly delivered on the promise that this is likely the most important debut SF novel we'll see this year". James Lovegrove, reviewing the book in his Financial Times column, notes that "many an anglophone author would kill to turn out prose half as good as this, especially on their maiden effort." Eric Brown, reviewing for The Guardian, finds the novel to be "a brilliant debut", while alluding to the "apocryphal" (and incorrect) myth that "this novel sold on the strength of its first line." Sam Bandah, at SciFiNow, praises the novel for "its engaging narrative and characters backed by often almost intimidatingly good sci-fi concepts."

Criticism for the novel has generally centred on Rajaniemi's sparse "show, don't tell" writing style. Brown notes that "the author makes no concessions to the lazy reader with info-dumps or convenient explanations." Niall Alexander, of the Speculative Scotsman, states that "had there been some sort of index, [he] would have gladly (and repeatedly) referred to it during the mind-boggling first third of The Quantum Thief", while proclaiming the novel to be "the sci-fi debut of 2010."

== Awards ==
- Nominee for the 2011 Locus Award for Best First Novel.
- Third place for the 2011 John W. Campbell Memorial Award for Best Science Fiction Novel

== Bibliography ==
- The Quantum Thief, Hannu Rajaniemi: Gollancz, 2010, ISBN 0-575-08887-7 (paperback ISBN 0-575-08888-5)
- The Fractal Prince, Hannu Rajaniemi: Gollancz, 2012, ISBN 0-575-08891-5 (paperback ISBN 0-575-08893-1)
- The Causal Angel, Hannu Rajaniemi: Gollancz, 2014, ISBN 0-575-08896-6

== See also ==
- List of characters in the Jean le Flambeur series
