= The Causal Angel =

2014 novel by Hannu Rajaniemi

- First edition
- Author: Hannu Rajaniemi
- Cover artist: Kekai Kotaki
- Language: English
- Series: Jean le Flambeur
- Genre: Science fiction novel
- Publisher: UK: Gollancz; US: Tor Books
- Publication date: July 2014
- Publication place: United Kingdom
- Media type: Print (hardcover, paperback & ebook)
- Pages: 304
- ISBN: 9780765329516
- OCLC: 876900939
- Preceded by: The Fractal Prince

The Causal Angel is the third science fiction novel by Hannu Rajaniemi featuring the protagonist Jean le Flambeur. It was published in July 2014 by Gollancz in the UK and by Tor in the US. The novel is the finale of a trilogy. The previous novels in the series are The Quantum Thief (2010) and The Fractal Prince (2012).

== Synopsis ==
After the events of The Fractal Prince, Jean le Flambeur and Mieli are separated and their sentient spacecraft Perhonen is destroyed. The two protagonists, each in their own way, struggle to decide where their loyalties lie and how to proceed in the catastrophically altered situation. Meanwhile, the Solar System is plummeting into an all-out war of unprecedented scale and consequence. The most powerful factions, the Sobornost and the Zoku, are gathering their forces and making their plays, while simultaneously being torn apart by internal strifes.

== See also ==
- List of characters in the Jean le Flambeur series
