= The Fractal Prince =

2012 novel by Hannu Rajaniemi

- First edition
- Author: Hannu Rajaniemi
- Cover artist: Chris Moore
- Language: English
- Genre: Science fiction novel
- Publisher: UK: Gollancz; US: Tor Books
- Publication date: 2012
- Publication place: United Kingdom
- Media type: Print (hardcover & paperback)
- Pages: 448
- ISBN: 0-575-08891-5 (hardcover); ISBN 0-575-08892-3 (paperback)
- Preceded by: The Quantum Thief
- Followed by: The Causal Angel

The Fractal Prince is the second science fiction novel by Hannu Rajaniemi and the second novel to feature the post-human gentleman thief Jean le Flambeur. It was published in Britain by Gollancz in September 2012, and by Tor in the same year in the US. The novel is the second in the trilogy, following The Quantum Thief (2010) and preceding The Causal Angel (2014).

== Plot summary ==
After the events of The Quantum Thief, Jean le Flambeur and Mieli are on their way to Earth. Jean is trying to open the Schrödinger's Box he retrieved from the memory palace on the Oubliette. After making little progress, he is prodded by the ship Perhonen to talk to Mieli, who turns out to be possessed by the pellegrini again. This time, Jean identifies Mieli's employer as a Sobornost Founder, Joséphine Pellegrini, and gets her to reveal how he got captured, thereby picking up the clues to make plans for his next heist. No sooner is that done than an attack comes from the Hunter. The ship and crew barely survived that, and Jean realizes that he has to find a better way to open the Box - fast.

Mieli has been very quiet after they left Mars. She has given up almost everything to the pellegrini, even her identity, as she has promised to let the pellegrini make gogols of her in exchange for rescuing the thief. Yet, having to work with the thief is testing her, especially when the thief eventually does something even more unforgivable than stealing Sydän's jewel from her.

In the city of Sirr, on an Earth ravaged by wildcode, Tawaddud and Dunyazad are sisters and members of the powerful Gomelez family. Tawaddud is the black sheep of the family, having run away from her husband and consorted with a notorious jinn, a disembodied intelligence from the wildcode desert. Now Cassar Gomelez, her father, hopes to get her to curry favor with a gogol merchant, Abu Nuwas, so that he has enough votes in the Council for the upcoming decision to renegotiate the Cry of Wrath Accords with the Sobornost. Soon, Tawaddud is embroiled in an investigation with a Sobornost envoy into the murder that triggered the need for her father to forge a new alliance in the first place, and forced to confront old secrets that will change Sirr forever.

Somewhere else, in a bookshop and on a beach, a young boy is at play. His mother has told him not to talk to strangers, but there has never been anyone here before. Until now. Should he talk to them?

== Influences ==
In the acknowledgments, Rajaniemi cites the influence of "Andy Clark, Douglas Hofstadter, Maurice Leblanc, Jan Potocki and [...] The Arabian Nights."

=== Self-loops ===
In the novel, the idea that the mind is a self-loop may have been influenced by the theories of the Professor of Philosophy, Andy Clark, and the book I Am a Strange Loop by Douglas Hofstadter.

=== Frame stories ===
The novel uses frame stories rather extensively, a feature also of The Arabian Nights and Jan Potocki's The Manuscript Found in Saragossa. Several characters in Sirr are the namesakes of characters in these two earlier works as well. The events in The Quantum Thief are also retold at least once by Jean le Flambeur in the course of the events in this novel.

== Reception ==
The novel has received generally positive reviews.

However, criticisms of the novel still revolve around Rajaniemi's uncompromising "show, don't tell" style. For example, Amy Goldschlager, writing for the Los Angeles Review of Books, suggested that "[a] bit more explication of the physics involved (“surfing the deficit angle”?) would really be helpful, more helpful than the description of the Schrödinger’s Cat problem given earlier in the book".

== Bibliography ==
- The Fractal Prince, Hannu Rajaniemi: Gollancz, 2012, ISBN 978-0-575-08891-7 (paperback ISBN 978-0-575-08892-4)

== See also ==
- List of characters in the Jean le Flambeur series
