= N-player game =

Game which can have any number of players

In game theory, an n-player game is a game which is well defined for any number of players. This is usually used in contrast to standard 2-player games that are only specified for two players. In defining n-player games, game theorists usually provide a definition that allow for any (finite) number of players. The limiting case of $n \to \infty$ is the subject of mean field game theory.

Changing games from 2-player games to n-player games entails some concerns. For instance, the Prisoner's dilemma is a 2-player game. One might define an n-player Prisoner's Dilemma where a single defection results everyone else getting the sucker's payoff. Alternatively, it might take certain amount of defection before the cooperators receive the sucker's payoff. (One example of an n-player Prisoner's Dilemma is the Diner's dilemma.)

== Analysis ==
n-player games can not be solved using minimax, the theorem that is the basis of tree searching for 2-player games. Other algorithms, like max^{n}, are required for traversing the game tree to optimize the score for a specific player.
