= Hannu Rajaniemi =

Finnish businessman and writer (born 1978)

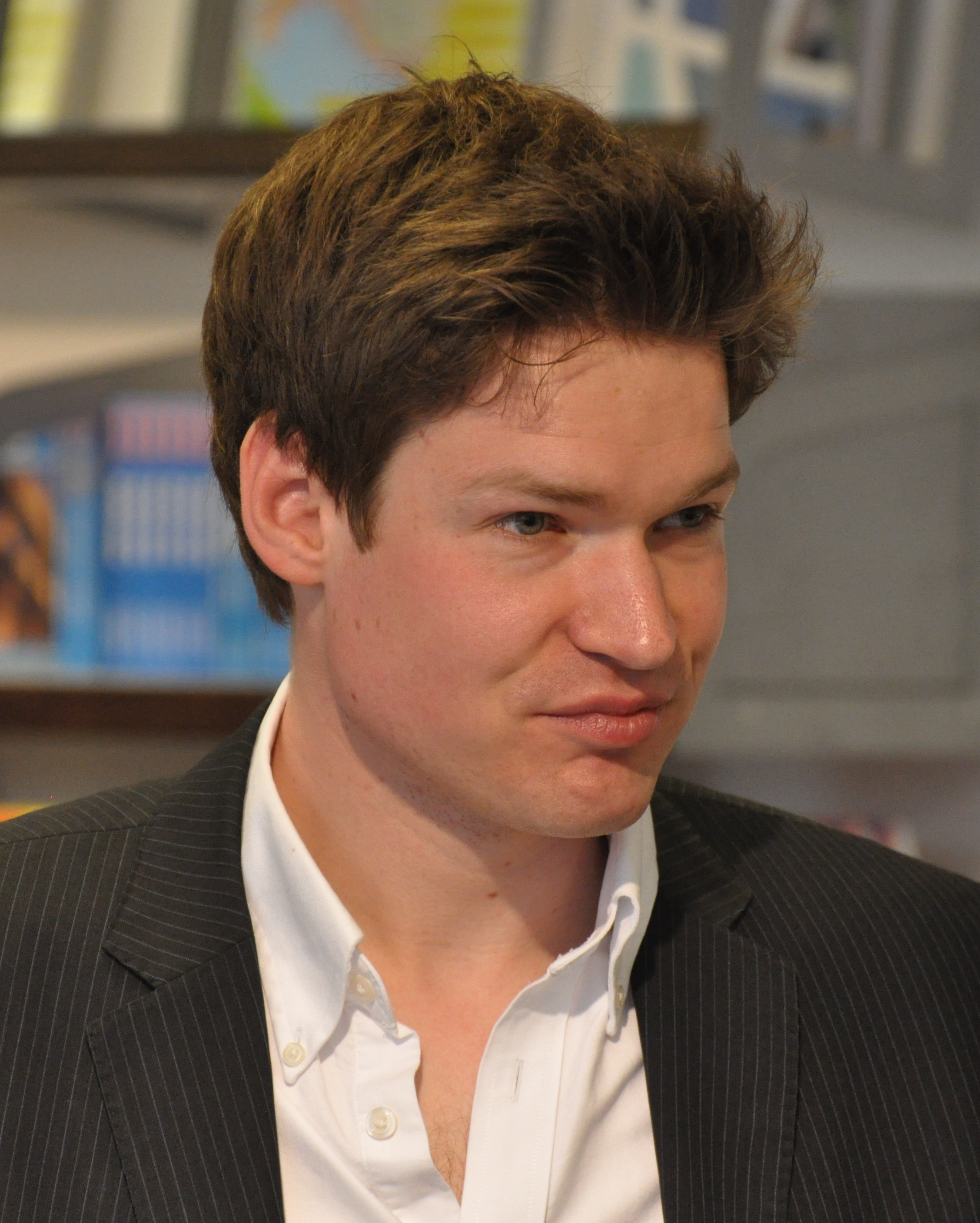
- Rajaniemi in 2011
- Born: 9 March 1978 (age 48); Ylivieska, Finland
- Occupations: Writer, entrepreneur
- Writing career
- Language: English, Finnish
- Period: 2003–present
- Genres: Fantasy, science fiction

Hannu Rajaniemi (born 9 March 1978) is a Finnish-born writer and biotechnology entrepreneur. He has published literary works in fantasy and science fiction, and writes in both English and Finnish.

== Early life and education ==
Rajaniemi was born in Ylivieska, Finland, in 1978.

He holds a BSc in mathematics from the University of Oulu, a Certificate of Advanced Study in Mathematics from the University of Cambridge and a PhD in mathematical physics from the University of Edinburgh. Prior to starting his PhD candidature, he completed his national service as a research scientist for the Finnish Defence Forces.

While pursuing his PhD in Edinburgh, Rajaniemi joined Writers' Bloc, a writers' group in Edinburgh that organizes semi-regular spoken-word performances and counts Charles Stross amongst its members.

== Literary career ==
Early works include his first published short story, "Shibuya No Love", in 2003 and his short story "Deus Ex Homine" in Nova Scotia, a 2005 anthology of Scottish science fiction and fantasy, which caught the attention of his current literary agent, John Jarrold.

Rajaniemi gained attention in October 2008 when Jarrold secured a three-book deal for him with Gollancz, on the basis of only twenty-four double-spaced pages. His debut novel, The Quantum Thief, was published in September 2010 by Gollancz in Britain and was published in May 2011 by Tor Books in the U.S. The novel was nominated for the 2011 Locus Award for Best First Novel. A sequel, The Fractal Prince, was published in September 2012 by Gollancz in Britain, and in October 2012 by Tor in the U.S. The third book in the series, The Causal Angel, was published in July 2014 by Gollancz in the U.K. and by Tor in the U.S. A standalone espionage procedural, Summerland was published in 2018 to a mixed reception.

Rajaniemi took inspiration from the literary works of Jules Verne in both his career in science and his science-fiction writing. Other influences include Maurice Leblanc, Arthur Conan Doyle and architecture blogger Geoff Manaugh.

== Business career ==
Rajaniemi co-founded Helix nanotechnologies.

He is the founding director of a commercial research organisation ThinkTank Maths. He cofounded the biotechnology company Helix Nano with Nikolai Eroshenko in 2013. Rajaniemi is the co-founder of Red Queen Bio, a startup aimed at countering the threat of AI bioweapons that spun out of Helix Nano and which attracted investment from OpenAI in a $15 million seed round in 2025.

== Awards and honors ==
- 2012 Tähtivaeltaja Award, winner (best science-fiction book published in Finnish language) for The Quantum Thief.
- 2011 Science Fiction & Fantasy Translation Awards, winner, Short Form category, translation of Hannu Rajaniemi's "Elegy for a Young Elk".
- 2011 Locus Award for Best First Novel, nominee, The Quantum Thief
- 2011 John W. Campbell Memorial Award, third place, The Quantum Thief
- 2013 John W. Campbell Memorial Award, nominee, The Fractal Prince

== Personal life ==
As of 2014, Rajaniemi lived in San Francisco, California, with his wife. Before moving to the U.S., he lived in the United Kingdom for over ten years.

== Works ==
=== Novels ===
- Summerland (2018, ISBN 978-1473203273)
- Darkome (2024, ISBN 9781473203327)

==== The Jean le Flambeur series ====
- The Quantum Thief (2010, ISBN 978-0-575-08888-7)
  - Third place, John W. Campbell Memorial Award for Best Science Fiction Novel
- The Fractal Prince (2012, ISBN 978-0-575-08891-7)
- The Causal Angel (2014, ISBN 978-0-575-08896-2)

=== Collections ===
- Words of Birth and Death (2006, Bloc Press), as a limited-edition chapbook.
  - "The Viper Blanket"
  - "Barley Child"
  - "Fisher of Men"
- Hannu Rajaniemi: Collected Fiction (2015) ISBN 978-1-61696-192-3

=== Short fiction ===
A partial list includes:

- "Shibuya No Love"
  - Published in futurismic.com, 2003
  - Available online
- "Deus Ex Homine"
  - First anthologized in Nova Scotia: New Scottish Speculative Fiction, 2005, ISBN 978-1-84183-086-5
  - The Year's Best Science Fiction 23, 2006, edited by Gardner Dozois, ISBN 0-312-35334-0
  - Year's Best SF 11, 2006, edited by David Hartwell and Kathryn Cramer, ISBN 0-06-087341-8
- "His Master's Voice"
  - Published in Interzone 218, October 2008
  - Available online in English and Finnish
  - Audio version available online as a podcast on the Escape Pod (episode #227) and Starship Sofa (Aural Delights No. 98)
- "Elegy for a Young Elk"
  - Published in Subterranean, Spring 2010
  - Won the award for short from in the 2011 Science Fiction & Fantasy Translation Awards.
- "The Server and the Dragon"
  - Published in Engineering Infinity, edited by Jonathan Strahan, December 2010
- "Invisible Planets"
  - Published in Reach for Infinity, edited by Jonathan Strahan, May 2014
- "Unchained: A story of love, loss, and blockchain"
  - Published in MIT Technology Review, 25 April 2018.

== See also ==
- List of University of Cambridge people
- List of University of Edinburgh people
- List of fantasy authors
- List of Finnish writers
- List of novelists
- List of people from California
- List of science-fiction authors
- List of short-story authors
