= James W. Friedman =

American economist (1936–2016)

James W. Friedman (September 25, 1936 – February 17, 2016) was an American economist.

A native of Cleveland, Ohio, born to parents Theodore and Gertrude, Friedman grew up in Bay City, Michigan. He graduated from the University of Michigan, and completed a doctorate at Yale University in 1963. Friedman began teaching at Yale, and later joined the faculties of the University of Rochester, and Virginia Tech. In 1977, he was elected a fellow of the Econometric Society. Friedman moved to the University of North Carolina at Chapel Hill in 1985, and was named Kenan Professor of Economics. He held the professorship until retirement in 2001.

The famed game theorist Robert Axelrod in his book The Evolution of Cooperation, named the unforgiving strategy for repeated prisoner's dilemma known as Grim trigger calling it "Friedman" following an article by Friedman about this strategy. According to the Grim trigger strategy, once the other side defected the player responds with continued defecting forever, "in retaliation", thus "pulling the trigger" of this trigger strategy.

== Scientific Books and papers ==
- A Non-cooperative Equilibrium for Supergames - Friedman's article about Grim trigger on JSTOR published in The Review of Economic Studies Vol. 38, No. 1 (Jan., 1971), pp. 1–12 (12 pages), Oxford University Press
- James W Friedman's books on the WorldCat world library catalog
- An Experiment in Noncooperative Oligopoly, JAI Press, Greenwich, Connecticut, 1980, reprinted 5 times. (on WorldCat)
- Oligopoly Theory, Cambridge University Press, 1983. Reprinted 7 times with 3 editions. (On WorldCat)
- Game Theory with Applications to Economics, Oxford University Press, 1986. Textbook reprinted in 5 editions and 4 Spanish translation editions. (On WorldCat)
- Infinite Horizon Spatial Duopoly with Collusive Pricing and Noncollusive Location Choice, Jacques-François Thisse, Université catholique, Louvain-la-Neuve, 1991 (On WorldCat)
- Problems Of Coordination in Economic Activity Kluwer Academic Publishers, Boston, 1994, reprinted 10 times. (On WorldCat)
- Problems of Coordination in Economic Activity Springer Publishing, Dordecht Netherlands 1994, reprinted twice. (On WorldCat)
