= NZGS =

NZGS may refer to:

- New Zealand Gallantry Star, military decoration of the New Zealand armed forces
- New Zealand Geographical Society, part of the Royal Society of New Zealand
- New Zealand Geological Survey, government science agency
- New Zealand Go Society, national governing body for the board game
- Gisborne Airport (ICAO code), North Island of New Zealand
- New Zealand Geotechnical Society, a technical society affiliated to Engineering New Zealand
