= Live and let live (World War I) =

Spontaneous nonaggressive co-operative behaviour during the First World War

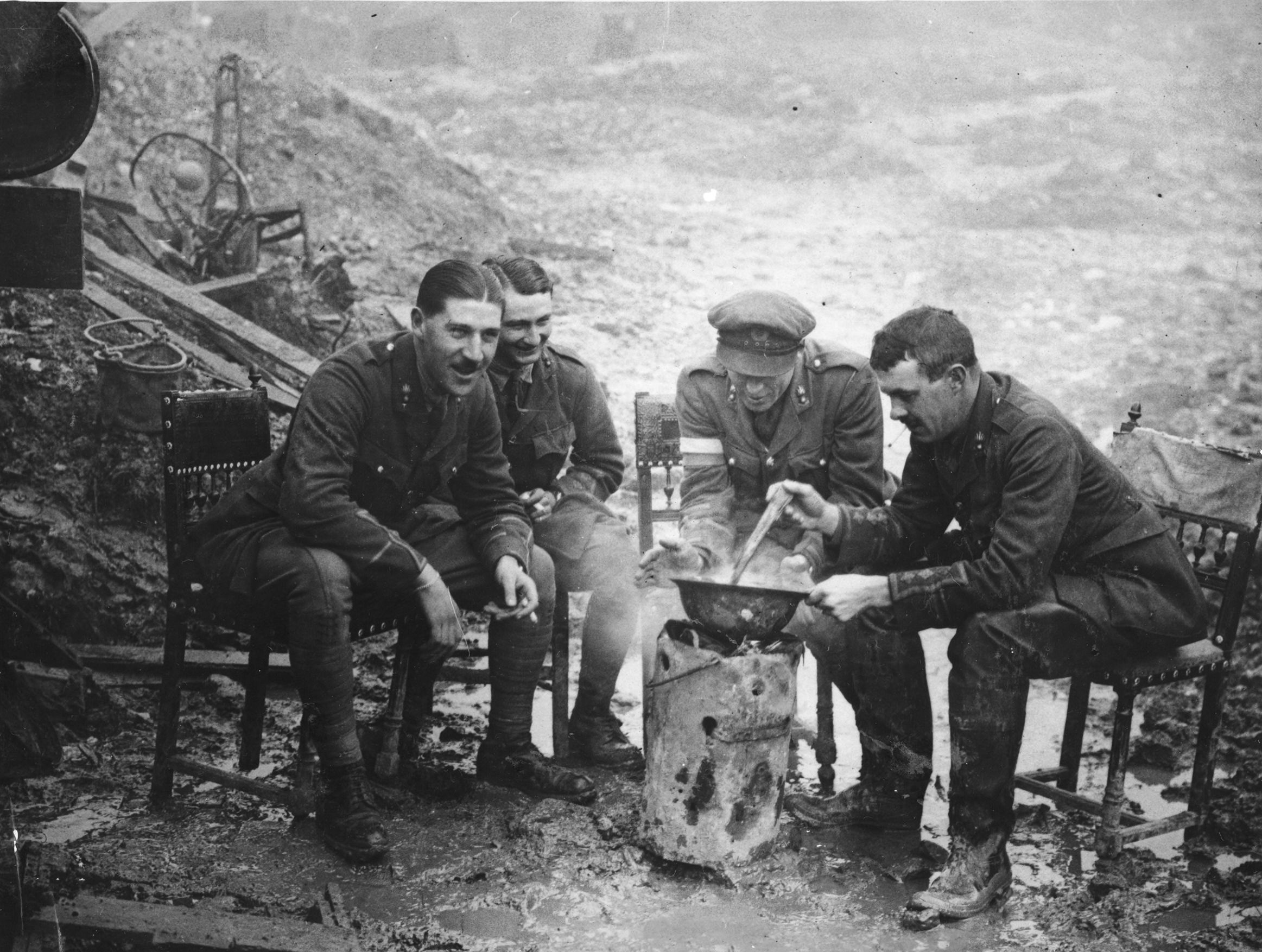
Four Royal Fusiliers officers cooking near the Western Front during World War I

Live and let live is the non-aggressive co-operative behavior that developed spontaneously during the First World War, particularly during prolonged periods of trench warfare on the Western Front. Perhaps one of the most famous examples of this is the Christmas truce of 1914. It was a process that can be characterised as the deliberate abstaining from the use of violence during war. Sometimes it can take the form of overt truces or pacts negotiated locally by soldiers. At other times it can be a tacit behaviour—sometimes characterised as "letting sleeping dogs lie"—whereby both sides refrain from firing or using their weapons, or deliberately discharge them in a ritualistic or routine way that signals their non-lethal intent.

== Examples ==
This behaviour was found at the small-unit level, sections, platoons or companies, usually observed by the "other ranks", e.g., privates and non-commissioned officers. Examples were found from the lone soldier standing sentry duty, refusing to fire on exposed enemy soldiers, up to snipers, machine-guns teams and even field-artillery batteries.

Upper echelon commanders—those of divisions, corps and armies—and their staffs were aware of this tendency towards non-aggression, and would sometimes analyse casualty statistics to detect it. Raids or patrols were often ordered to foster the correct "offensive spirit" in the troops.

The Live and Let Live system was fragile at best and was easily broken by occurrences of lethal force, becoming even more tenuous as the war dragged on.

== Research ==
Tony Ashworth researched this topic based upon diaries, letters, and testimonies of veterans from the war. He discovered that 'live and let live' was widely known about at the time and was most common at specific times and places. It was often to be found when a unit had been withdrawn from battle and was sent to a rest sector.

== Game theory ==
Some scholars of game theory, like Robert Axelrod, have characterised Live and Let Live as an iterated variant of the prisoner's dilemma. Axelrod linked Live and Let Live to the co-operative strategy referred to as Tit for Tat.

Axelrod's interpretation of "Live and Let Live" as a prisoner's dilemma has been disputed by political scientists Joanne Gowa and Andrew Gelman, who (separately) argue that the assumptions underlying the prisoner's dilemma do not hold in this example.

== See also ==
- Fraternization
