= The Complexity of Cooperation =

2011 book by Robert Axelrod

- First edition
- Author: Robert Axelrod
- Language: English
- Publisher: Princeton University Press
- Publication date: 2011
- Pages: xiv, 232 pp.
- ISBN: 0691015678
- OCLC: 36327288
- Preceded by: The Evolution of Cooperation

The Complexity of Cooperation, by Robert Axelrod, is the sequel to The Evolution of Cooperation. It is a compendium of seven articles that previously appeared in journals on a variety of subjects. The book extends Axelrod's method of applying the results of game theory, in particular that derived from analysis of the Prisoner's Dilemma (IPD) problem, to real world situations.

== Prisoner's Dilemma findings ==
Axelrod explains the Tit for tat (TFT or T4T) strategy emerged as the most robust option in early IPD tournaments on computer. This strategy combines a willingness to cooperate with a determination to punish non-cooperation. In these articles, however, he shows, that under more complex circumstances, such as the possibility of error, strategies that are a little more cooperative or a little less punitive do even better than TFT. Generous TFT, or GTFT, cooperates a bit more often than TFT, while Contrite TFT or CTFT defects less frequently.

== Applications ==
Axelrod applies various models related to IPD to a variety of situations, drawing conclusions from these simulations about the ways in which groups form, adhere, oppose or join other groups, and other topics in the fields of genetic evolution, business, political science, military alliances, wars, and more. He has added introductions to these articles explaining what real-world issues drove his research.

== Critical response ==
Philosopher and political economist Francis Fukuyama, writing for Foreign Affairs, praises the book for showing that realist models, which assume that in situations lacking a single sovereign actor anarchy will necessarily result, are too simplistic. Fukuyuma expresses concern, however, that the game theory approaches aren't sufficiently complex to model real international relations, because they assume a world with large numbers of simple actors. Fukuyama holds that, instead, the real world consists of a small number of highly complex actors, thus potentially limiting the applicability of Axelrod's analysis.
