= Robert Axelrod =

Robert Axelrod may refer to:

- Robert Axelrod (political scientist) (born 1943), American political scientist
- Robert Axelrod (actor) (1949–2019), American voice actor
- Bobby Axelrod, the lead character in the American television series Billions, played by Damian Lewis
