= Peace war game =

Iterated game for peace and conflict studies

Peace war game is an iterated game originally played in academic groups and by computer simulation for years to study possible strategies of cooperation and aggression. As peace makers became richer over time it became clear that making war had greater costs than initially anticipated. The only strategy that acquired wealth more rapidly was a constant aggressor making war continually to gain resources. This led to the development of the "provokable nice guy" strategy, a peace-maker until attacked. Multiple players continue to gain wealth cooperating with each other while bleeding the constant aggressor.

The peace war game is a variation of the iterated prisoner's dilemma in which the decisions (Cooperate, Defect) are replaced by (Peace, War). Strategies remain the same with reciprocal altruism, also known as "Tit for Tat" or "provokable nice guy", as the best deterministic one. This strategy is simply to make peace on the first iteration of the game; after that, the player does what his opponent did on the previous move. A slightly better strategy is "Tit for Tat with forgiveness". When the opponent makes war, on the next move, the player sometimes makes peace anyway, with a small probability. This allows an escape from wasting cycles of retribution, a motivation similar to the Rule of Ko in the game of Go. "Tit for Tat with forgiveness" is best when miscommunication is introduced, when one's move is incorrectly reported to the opponent. A typical payoff matrix for two players (A, B) of one iteration of this game is:

A.. B:	Peace	War
Peace	(2, 2)	(0, 3)
War	(3, 0)	(1, 1)

Here a player's resources have a value of 2, half of which must be spent to wage war. In this case, there exists a Nash equilibrium, a mutually best response for a single iteration, here (War, War), by definition heedless of consequences in later iterations. "Provokable nice guy's" optimality depends on iterations. How many are necessary is likely tied to the payoff matrix and probabilities of choosing. A subgame perfect version of this strategy is "Contrite Tit-for-Tat" which is to make peace unless one is in "good standing" and one's opponent is not. Good ("standing" assumed) means to make peace with good opponents, make peace when bad, or make war when good and opponent is not.

== See also ==
- Iterated prisoner's dilemma
- Just war theory
- Paradox of tolerance
- Tit for Tat
- WarGames
