= Handicapping in Go =

In the game of Go, a handicap can be given when two players of different strengths play each other to offset the difference and make a close, exciting game more likely. Handicapping is much more common in Go than in other board games, as the system adapts comparatively well to handicaps; perhaps half of all Go games are played with handicaps. Handicaps are given by means of stones and compensation points (komi). A small handicap is the weaker player plays as Black and gets the first move, but offers no komi for the advantage. This might be given with a difference of one rank between players. Larger handicaps give free stones placed at the start of the game for the Black player.

== Handicap stones ==
The rank difference within a given amateur ranking system is one guide to how many handicap stones should be given to make the game a more equal contest. As a general rule, each rank represents the value of one stone. For example, a 3 kyu player gives a 7 kyu player four handicap stones to allow for an interesting game with roughly equal challenge for both players. If traditional fixed placement of the handicap stones is used, nine stones is normally the maximum handicap. Larger handicaps are possible, but generally result in a strange game, as this means one player is comparatively very weak and may not be understanding White's moves well.

The above rank relationship applies for kyu and amateur dan (1-7d) ranks. Professional dan ranks are not as comparable. They are awarded by professional Go players' organizations, and unlike amateur ranks are more an indication of achievements in tournament play. They can still be used as a rough guess, but the skill difference in professional dan ranks can be less than a third of a stone per rank.

== Handicap placement ==
=== Fixed placement ===
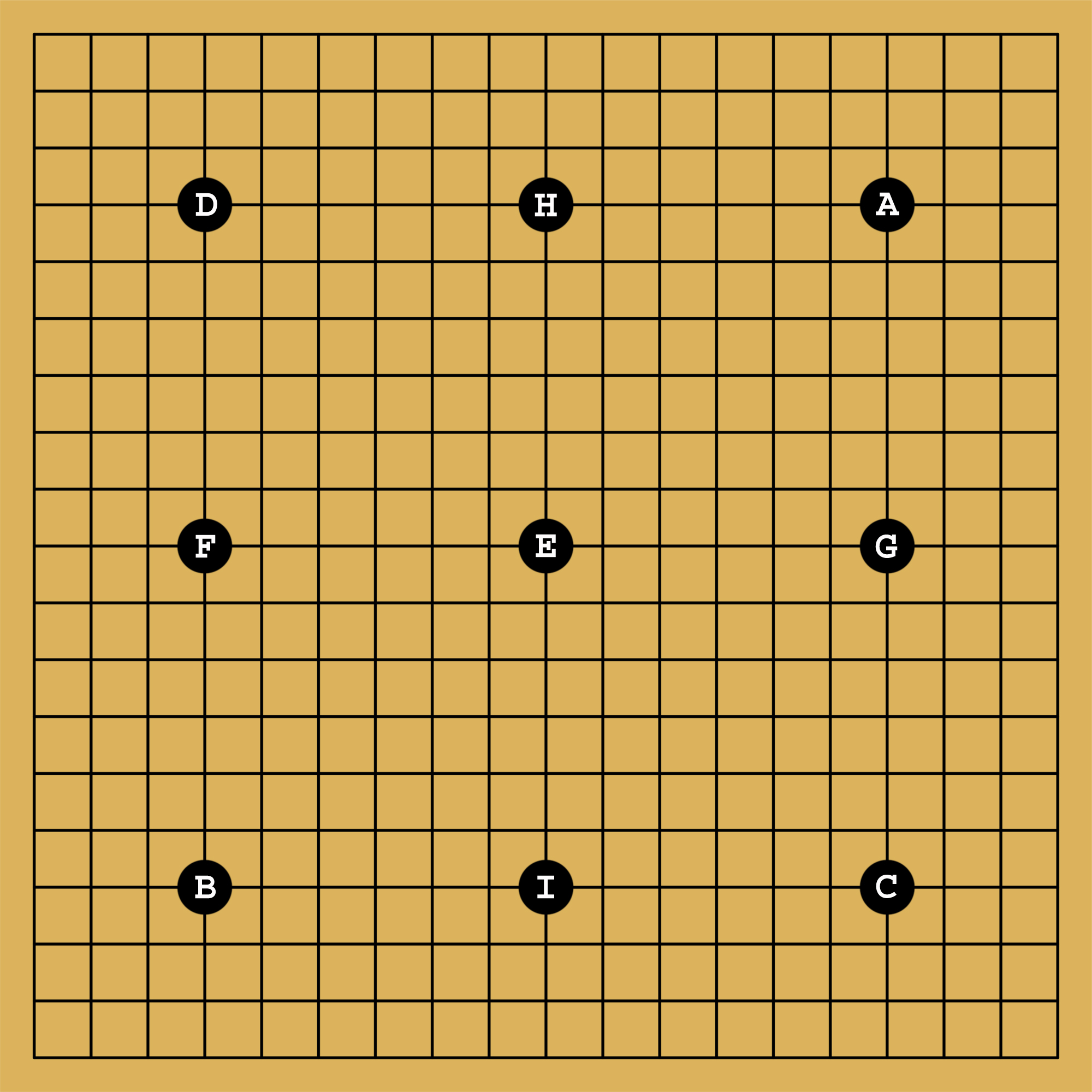
The traditional placement of handicap stones

There are 9 star points marked on a 19 x 19 board – in each corner on the (4,4) point, in the middle of each side on the fourth line, (4,10); and the very center of the board, (10,10). Traditionally handicaps are always placed on the star points, as follows:

Handicap locations
Stones	Placement	Locations
1	Black plays their first stone as they wish, and give no komi	None
2	Black plays the star points to their upper right and lower left	A,B
3	Black adds the star point to their lower right (In Classical Chinese rules the third handicap stone is placed on tengen)	A,B,C (or E)
4	Black takes all four corner star points	A,B,C,D
5	Black adds the center star point	A,B,C,D,E
6	Black takes all three star points at left and right	A,B,C,D,F,G
7	Black adds the center star point	A,B,C,D,E,F,G
8	Black takes all star points except the center	A,B,C,D,F,G,H,I
9	Black takes all nine star points	A,B,C,D,E,F,G,H,I

=== Free placement ===
Some rulesets allow for free placement of handicap stones, rather than the fixed star point locations. In free placement, one can place handicap stones anywhere on the board without restriction, as black receives a number of unanswered moves at the start of the game. For example, Ing rules allow free placement. The fixed locations are at the (4,4) points in the corners, so if Black wishes to gain experience playing (3,4) corner openings, or others such as (3,3), (5,4), (5,3), etc., free placement can allow this.

== Small board handicaps ==
Small Go boards are often used for novice players (double-digit kyu players) just learning to play Go, or for quick games (most commonly 13×13 and 9×9). As the fewer moves made when playing on smaller boards gives White fewer chances to overcome the advantage conferred by the handicap, each free stone is worth more. Accordingly, smaller handicaps are used for the same difference in rank than would be given on a 19x19 board.

The per-rank handicap is reduced, by a scaling factor. Various estimates have been given for the factor that applies to 13×13, in the range 2.5 up to 4; and on grounds both theoretical and experimental (small-board tournament play). The evidence is that 2.5 is more realistic than 4, for clock games. The corresponding factor for a 9×9 board is not easy to understand, and the change for each stone added is very large.

One theoretical approach is according to the distribution of the number of moves made in a game on a board of a given size relative to the number made on a 19×19 board. Using estimates that a 19×19 game will last about 250-300 moves, a 13×13 game about 95-120 moves, and a 9×9 game about 40-50 moves, a quadratic formula for the ratio of the mean number of plays may apply. Another way to view the matter is that barring blunders, White catches up by means of Black's 'small errors', so that White's deficit dwindles at a roughly constant rate, and thus the game length makes sense as scaling factor.

Each full stone of handicap on a 13×13 board is in any case probably equivalent to about 2.5 to 3 ranks, and each full stone on a 9×9 board is equivalent to about 6 ranks. For example, if the appropriate handicap is 9 (i.e., 8.5) stones on a 19×19 board, the handicap between those two players is reduced to 4 (because 3.5 × 2.5 = 8.75) stones on a 13x13 board and 2 (1.5 × 6 = 9) stones on a 9×9 board. A 5 (i.e., 4.5) stone handicap on a 9×9 board is accordingly equivalent to a handicap of 27 or 28 stones on a 19×19 board.

Traditional handicap locations on a 9x9 board, in order of placement

== Compensation points ==
In games between players of equal rank, the Black player compensates for the advantage of playing first by offering compensation points (komi) to the White player. When the difference in strength is one rank, no handicap stone is given. Instead the stronger player takes White but without compensation points.

An alternative type of handicap for differences of rank greater than one is that rather than Black gaining starting stones, there is reverse komi. In it, the weaker player takes black, and is given both the first move and compensation points too. Compensation points are sometimes preferred to stones because the players would like to play or practice as if it is an even game, with opening joseki strategy unchanged.

== Historical handicaps ==
An early precedent for match-based handicap conventions appears in the Dunhuang Go Manual (c. 550 CE), which discusses handicap terminology and records what is believed to be the earliest mention of deciding a handicapped match on a best-of-three basis.

Before the 20th century, other systems of handicaps were used. For example, two players might agree to a multi-game match (jubango) where the games were played without komi, but the weaker player would be granted the black stones in two games out of every three in the match, giving them an edge in the overall match standings.

== See also ==
- Handicap (chess)
- Handicap (shogi)
