= Komi (Go) =

Points given to compensate for the disadvantage of playing second

Komi (込み, コミ) in the game of Go are points added to the score of the player with the white stones as compensation for playing second. The value of Black's first-move advantage is generally considered to be between 5 and 7 points by the end of the game.

Standard komi is 6.5 points under the Japanese and Korean rules; under Chinese, Ing and AGA rules standard komi is 7.5 points; under New Zealand rules standard komi is 7 points. Komi typically applies only to games where both players are evenly ranked. In the case of a one-rank difference, the stronger player will typically play with the white stones and players often agree on a simple 0.5-point komi to break a tie (jigo) in favour of white, or no komi at all. Komidashi (コミ出し) is the more complete Japanese language term. The Chinese term is tiē mù (simplified Chinese: 贴目; traditional Chinese: 貼目) and the Korean term is deom (덤).

Efforts have been made to determine the value of komi for boards much smaller than the standard 19x19 grid for go, such as 7x7. When introducing Environmental Go, Elwyn Berlekamp made a broad generalisation of komi to illustrate the practical value of the temperature concept from combinatorial game theory.

== Whole number and halves ==
Conventional komi in most competitions is a half-integer such as 6.5 points. This is convenient and the prevailing usage for knock-out tournaments, since it makes a tied game (jigo in Japanese) and rematches less likely (a drawn game is still possible under Japanese rules since the Japanese rule prohibiting repeated positions applies only to the simplest possibility, called 'ko'). In a club or friendly game this is not a problem, so a value such as 6 points is just as practical. Within a Swiss system draw, tied games are not convenient and tiebreakers are used.

Some argue there is nothing wrong in having a tie. Forbidding a draw may misrepresent one player as superior when there is no difference in skill.

== History ==
White is at a disadvantage because Black gets to move first, giving that player sente ("initiative"). Records show that the winning percentage of Black is higher. The importance of playing first was, however, not dealt with by the rules until the 1920s, and then only tentatively.

The compensation (komi) system was introduced into professional Go in Japan as a gradual process of innovation, beginning in the 1920s. The Hisekai, a Go organization established in 1922 and dissolved with the formation of the Nihon Ki-in in 1924, used a 4.5 point komi among its many rule innovations. The correct value of komi has been re-evaluated over the years, as professional opening strategy has evolved.

At first, komi could be as low as 2.5 points or 3 points. It was later increased to 4.5, and then 5.5 points. A komi of 5.5 points was used for a long time, but research found that 5.5 points was insufficient to compensate for White's disadvantage. Statistical analyses of the year's games would sometimes appear in the Igo Nenkan (Kido Yearbook), backing up the intuition of many top players. The use of databases confirmed figures such as 53% victories for Black, not just at the highest level.

Komi was then raised to 6.5. Some events use as high as 7.5 points. Under the Chinese method of counting, the difference between 5.5 and 6.5 points is of minimal effect. Chinese sources usually in fact quote figures that are halved, such as 2.75 for 5.5, at least for Chinese domestic competitions, as one stone (the scoring increment typically used in China) is equivalent to two points.

Handicap games are almost universally played with a komi of 0.5 points. The advantage of playing one or more black stones (the number usually calculated as the difference in player's rank) before the white player's first move constitutes the remainder of the handicap, with the 0.5 komi determining white as winner in games that would otherwise be a draw.

John Fairbairn, a Go historian, has written on the history of komi. In his 1977 Introduction to Go he stated that the value was about 5.

== Effects on strategy ==
Since very minor mistakes can cost one point, discussion of the 'true' value for komi makes little sense, except at the level of the top-ranked players in the world. These are (in most cases) also the opening-theory experts, and evaluate opening strategies in practical play against their peers.

The introduction and then increase of komi has led to ever more ambitious or aggressive strategies for Black, the first player. In the days before komi, White as second player had to disrupt the smooth working of Black's classical strategies, described sometimes as aiming for a sure win by 3 points. From the introduction of komi in most pro events, around 1950, Black's older methods had to be reconsidered, since White suddenly needed appreciably less (in pro terms) in secure area. The 3-3 point became an interesting play for White, where previously it appeared experimental, and was developed in particular by Go Seigen and Sakata Eio.

In the following decades a mixture of classical and shinfuseki techniques became normal. The most obvious effect was the replacement of the 4-3 point by the 4-4 point as the most common way to first occupy a corner.

== Perfect Komi ==
In theory a perfect value of Komi would make each game result in Jigo (draw) given perfect play by both sides. Since in practice no human or computer can play perfect Go, this value is not known with certainty. However under area scoring rules and in the absence of Seki the perfect Komi can be shown to be an odd integer and statistics from professional and computer play suggest that 7 is the correct value.

== Local variations ==
Although 6.5 points is a common komi as of 2007, each country, association, and tournament may set its own specific komi:

- In Japan, the usual komi was once about 2.5 points. Some time later, it was raised to 4.5 points. In 1955 the Oza became the first tournament to adopt 5.5. The value of 5.5 became standard over some decades. The Nihon Ki-in increased the komi to 6.5 in 2002, citing Black's 51.855% win rate under the old rule.
- In Korea, it used to be 5.5, but is now 6.5.
- In China, 5.5 points was common, but 7.5 is now standard. A value of 6.5 would seldom give a different result from 5.5 due to Chinese scoring rules.
- In America, American Go association (AGA) official rules used to specify 5.5 points, however they later suggested also experimenting with values up to 8.5 points in both informal games and tournaments in order to gather data to determine the effects of increasing U.S. komi officially. The American Go Association changed komi from 5.5 to 7.5 in August 2004, effective 2005.
- The New Zealand rules specify a komi of 7.
- For the Ing Foundation (Ing rules) komi is specified as 8 points. Due to the different counting method used by the Ing system, this komi is equivalent to 7.5 points under the Japanese rules.

== Types ==
=== Fixed compensation point system ===
By far the most common type of komi is a fixed compensation point system. A fixed number of points, determined by the Go organization or the tournament director, is given to the second player (White) in an even game (without handicaps) to make up for first-player (Black) advantage.

=== Auction komi ===
As no one can be absolutely sure of the ideal value for komi, systems without fixed komi are used in some amateur matches and tournaments. This is called auction komi.

Examples of auction komi systems:

- the players do an "auction" by saying: "I am willing to play black against XXX komi" and the player who wins the auction (offers the highest komi) plays black.
- one player chooses the size of the komi, and the other player then chooses to play black or white. This version of auction komi becomes equivalent to the pie rule to Go, if choosing the size of the komi is considered to be a move that white player makes before the game would normally start.

=== Pie rule ===
- One player chooses komi, and the other player chooses whether to play black or white.

OR

- Black places their first stone, and after that white decides whether they want to play black or white.

== See also ==
- Pie rule
