= Rules of Go =

Details of the rules for the abstract strategy board game for two players

The rules of Go govern the play of the game of Go, a two-player board game. The rules have seen some variation over time and from place to place. This article discusses those sets of rules broadly similar to the ones currently in use in East Asia. Even among these, there is a degree of variation.

Notably, Chinese and Japanese rules differ in a number of aspects. The most significant of these are the scoring method, together with attendant differences in the manner of ending the game.

While differences between sets of rules may have moderate strategic consequences on occasion, they do not change the character of the game. The different sets of rules usually lead to the same game result, so long as the players make minor adjustments near the end of the game. Differences in the rules are said to cause problems in perhaps one in every 10,000 games in competition.

This article first presents a simple set of rules which are, except for wording, identical to those usually referred to as the Tromp–Taylor Rules, themselves close in most essential respects to the Chinese rules. These rules are then discussed at length, in a way that does not assume prior knowledge of Go on the part of the reader. The discussion is for the most part applicable to all sets of rules, with exceptions noted. Later sections of the article address major areas of variation in the rules of Go, and individual sets of rules.

== Basic rules ==
A set of rules suitable for beginners is presented here. The rules are studied more fully in § Explanation of the basic rules below.

Two statements of the same basic rules, differing only in wording, are given here. The first is a concise one due to James Davies. The second is a formulation of the basic rules used for expository purposes in this article.

Except for terminology, the basic rules are identical to the Logical Rules first proposed in their current form in September 1996 by John Tromp and Bill Taylor. They are also quite close to the Simplified Ing Rules of the European Go Federation, the only exception being the method of ending the game.

=== Concise statement ===
These rules appear in "The Rules and Elements of Go" by James Davies. They assume familiarity with the equipment used to play Go, for which one may refer to § Elements of the game below.

Notes: The words move and territory are used differently here than elsewhere in this article; play and area, respectively, are used instead. A clarification to rule 5 is added in parentheses.

1. The board is empty at the onset of the game (unless players agree to place a handicap).
2. Black makes the first move, after which White and Black alternate.
3. A move consists of placing one stone of one's own color on an empty intersection on the board.
4. A player may pass their turn at any time.
5. A stone or solidly connected group of stones of one color is captured and removed from the board when all the intersections directly adjacent to it are occupied by the enemy. (Capture of the enemy takes precedence over self-capture.)
6. If a stone or solidly connected group of stones of one color is enclosed and will eventually be captured, they are removed as captured at the end of the game.
7. No stone may be played so as to recreate a former board position.
8. Two consecutive passes end the game.
9. A player's area consists of all the points the player has either occupied or surrounded.
10. The player with more area wins.

These rules rely on common sense to make notions such as "connected group" and "surround" precise. What is here called a "solidly connected group of stones" is also called a chain.

=== Reference statement ===
The basic rules are formulated here in a more detailed way to ease their presentation in § Explanation of the basic rules below. (Each rule and definition links to a detailed explanation in that section.)

An optional rule prohibiting suicide is included as Rule 7A.

==== Players and equipment ====
- Rule 1. Players: Go is a game between two players, called Black and White.
- Rule 2. Board: Go is played on a plain grid of 19 horizontal and 19 vertical lines, called a board.
  - Definition. ("Intersection") A point on the board where a horizontal line meets a vertical line is called an intersection.
- Rule 3. Stones: Go is played with playing tokens known as stones. Each player has at their disposal an adequate supply (usually 180) of stones of the same color.

==== Positions ====
- Rule 4. Positions: At any time in the game, each intersection on the board is in one and only one of the following three states: 1) empty; 2) occupied by a black stone; or 3) occupied by a white stone. A position consists of an indication of the state of each intersection.
  - Definition. ("Adjacent") Two intersections are said to be adjacent if they are connected by a horizontal or vertical line with no other intersections between them. Note that intersections which are one away from each other diagonally, i.e., intersections that are connected by one horizontal and one vertical line, are not considered adjacent.
  - Definition. ("Connected") In a given position, two placed stones of the same color (or two empty intersections) are said to be connected if it is possible to draw a path from one intersection to the other by passing through only adjacent intersections of the same state (empty, occupied by white, or occupied by black).
  - Definition. ("Liberty") In a given position, a liberty of a placed stone is an empty intersection adjacent to that stone or adjacent to a stone which is connected to that stone.

==== Play ====
- Rule 5. Initial position: At the beginning of the game, the board is empty.
- Rule 6. Turns: Black moves first. The players alternate thereafter.
- Rule 7. Moving: When it is their turn, a player may either pass (by announcing "pass" and performing no action) or play. A play consists of the following steps (performed in the prescribed order):
  - Step 1. (Playing a stone) Placing a stone of their color on an empty intersection (chosen subject to Rule 8 and, if it is in effect, to Optional Rule 7A). It can never be moved to another intersection after being played.
  - Step 2. (Capture) Removing from the board any stones of their opponent's color that have no liberties.
  - Step 3. (Self-capture) Removing from the board any stones of their own color that have no liberties.
- Optional Rule 7A. Prohibition of suicide: A play is illegal if one or more stones of that player's color would be removed in Step 3 of that play.
- Rule 8. Prohibition of repetition: A play is illegal if it would have the effect (after all steps of the play have been completed) of creating a position that has occurred previously in the game.

==== End ====
- Rule 9. End: The game ends when both players have passed consecutively. The final position is the position on the board at the time the players pass consecutively.
  - Definition. ("Territory") In the final position, an empty intersection is said to belong to a player's territory if all stones adjacent to it and to all empty intersections connected to it are of that player's color.
  - Definition. ("Area") In the final position, an intersection is said to belong to a player's area if either: 1) it belongs to that player's territory; or 2) it is occupied by a stone of that player's color.
  - Definition. ("Score") A player's score is the number of intersections in their area in the final position.
- Rule 10. Winner: If one player has a higher score than the other, then that player wins. Otherwise, the game is a draw.

=== Comparative features of the basic rules ===
The essential features of these basic rules relative to other rulesets are summarized here. Each of the differences is discussed in greater detail in a later section of the article.

What variation exists among rulesets concerns primarily Rules 7A, 8, 9 and 10.

- The basic rules use area scoring, as in China and Taiwan, and as in the official rules of many Western countries. The main alternative is territory scoring. Though territory scoring is the system used in Japan and Korea, and is customarily used in the West, it is not possible to use territory scoring unless Rule 9 is replaced by a much more complex end-of-game rule. The goal of these basic rules is to present a simple system first. See § Scoring systems below.
- The basic rules require the players to "play the game out" entirely. Virtually all rulesets used in practice provide some mechanism that allows players to begin scoring the game before the final position (the one used to score the game) has been reached. In some cases, this is merely a convenience intended to save time. In others, it may be an essential feature of the game. In any case, explaining these rules might obscure the nature of the game somewhat for a person unfamiliar with it. See § Counting phase below.
- The basic rules allow suicide (or self-capture). This is unusual outside of Taiwan and New Zealand. Inclusion of Optional Rule 7A is in line with practice elsewhere. See § Suicide below.
- The basic rules apply the rule of positional superko. This, or a similar rule, is common in official Western rulesets, but not in East Asia. See § Repetition below.
- The basic rules do not contain any special exceptions for territory in a seki. This agrees with most practice outside Japan and Korea. See § Seki below.
- The basic rules do not have a komi. This is now unusual in even-strength games, but was common practice until the mid-twentieth century. A komi is a number of points, usually five to eight, awarded to White in compensation for moving second. See § Komi below.
- The basic rules make no provision for the use of handicap stones. See § Handicap below.
- The basic rules do not specify a counting system. A counting system is a conventional method for calculating the difference in score between the players (hence determining the winner). It may incorporate various devices, such as filling in one's territory after the game, or shifting stones on the board into patterns, which allow quicker calculation of the difference in scores.

== Explanation of the basic rules ==
The object of the game of go is, in rough terms, to control more territory at the end of the game than one's opponent does.

=== Elements of the game ===
==== Players ====
Rule 1. Go is a game between two players, called Black and White.

The choice of black or white is traditionally done by chance between players of even strength. The method of selection is called nigiri. One player (A) takes a handful of white stones; the other player (B) then places either one or two black stones on the board, indicating "even" or "odd". Player A counts the number stones in their hand to determine whether there is an odd or even number. If the number of stones matches the other player's selection of "even" or "odd", Player B will play the black stones; if not, they will take the white stones.

When players are of different strengths, the weaker player takes black. Black may also pre-place several handicap stones before play begins, to compensate for the difference in strength—see below.

==== Board ====
The board, or "goban"

Rule 2. Go is played on a plane grid of 19 horizontal and 19 vertical lines, called a board.

Definition: A point on the board where a horizontal line meets a vertical line is called an intersection. Two intersections are said to be adjacent if they are distinct and connected by a horizontal or vertical line with no other intersections between them.

The condition that the intersections be "distinct" is included to ensure that an intersection is not considered to be adjacent to itself.

Intersections are also called points.

There are 361 points on a regular 19 × 19 board.

For simplicity, the rules will be illustrated mostly using 5 × 5 boards.

Each of the following diagrams shows two points on a 5 × 5 board:

Go board, 5 by 5. Marks: circle at B2; circle at C2.	Go board, 5 by 5. Marks: circle at A2; circle at A1.	Go board, 5 by 5. Marks: circle at A2; circle at C2.	Go board, 5 by 5. Marks: circle at D4; circle at C3.
Adjacent points	Adjacent points	Non-adjacent points	Non-adjacent points

In the first two diagrams, the points are adjacent; in the third and fourth, they are not.

Though 19 × 19 boards are standard, go can be played on another size board. Particularly common sizes for quick games are 9 × 9 and 13 × 13. (See also "Board size" below.)

Beginners might prefer to play on a 9 × 9 board to start. The nature of the game remains similar enough to make this worthwhile, yet the games are shorter. For beginners, playing longer games is less important than playing a greater number of games.

==== Stones ====
Rule 3. Go is played with playing tokens known as stones. Each player has at their disposal an adequate supply of stones of their color.

Traditionally, Black is given 181 stones, and White, 180, to start the game. This is almost always sufficient, but if it turns out to be insufficient, extra stones will be used.

=== Positions ===
Rule 4. At any time in the game, each intersection on the board is in one and only one of the following three states: 1) empty; 2) occupied by a black stone; or 3) occupied by a white stone. A position consists of an indication of the state of each intersection.

Specifying a position involves only the current state of the board. It requires no indication of whose turn it is, nor any information relating to previous moves or states of the board. This definition of "position" is used in Rule 8 ("positional superko").

The diagram shows a possible position:

Go board, 5 by 5. Black stones: B5, E5, A4, B4, E4, D2, B1. White stones: D4, C3, A2, C2, E2, C1, D1.

Naturally, two stones are said to be adjacent if they occupy adjacent intersections. Similarly, a stone and an intersection are adjacent if the stone occupies an intersection adjacent to that intersection.

==== Connected stones and points ====
Definition. Two intersections of the same state are said to be connected if there exists a path from one intersection to the other intersection, passing only through adjacent intersections of that same state (e.g., The path is one of: entirely empty, entirely occupied by white, or entirely occupied by black). Two stones are said to be connected if the two intersections occupied by those stones are connected.

The concept of connected stones is used to describe (via the concept of liberties, defined below) the conditions in which stones are captured by a move. The concept of connected empty points is used only at the end of the game, to define a player's score.

In the following position, the stones 1 and 7 are connected by the sequence of black stones 1, 2, ..., 7, in which each stone (other than 1) is adjacent to the stone before it. The empty points a and k are connected by the sequence of empty points a, b, ..., k, in which each point (other than a) is adjacent to the one before it. In fact, it is easy to see in this position that all the black stones are connected to each other and that all the empty points are connected to each other.

Go board, 5 by 5. Moves: 1 black A1; 2 black B1; 3 black B2; 4 black B3; 5 black C3; 6 black D3; 7 black D2. Marks: lK tile at A4; letter J at B4; letter I at C4; letter H at D4; rG tile at E4; rF tile at E3; letter A at C2; rE tile at E2; dB tile at C1; dC tile at D1; drD tile at E1.lKJIHrG456rF3A7rE12dBdCdrD

The following position can be used as an example for when stones and empty points are connected.

Go board, 5 by 5. Moves: 1 black B5; 1 black B4; 1 black A4; 2 black B1; 3 black D2; 4 black E4; 4 black E5; 5 white A2; 6 white C2; 6 white C3; 6 white D1; 6 white C1; 7 white E2; 8 white D4. Marks: ulA tile at A5; uF tile at C5; uF tile at D5; letter F at C4; lB tile at A3; letter B at B3; letter E at D3; rE tile at E3; letter B at B2; dlC tile at A1; drD tile at E1.ulA1uFuF411F84lBB6ErE5B637dlC266drD

In the diagram, stones and empty points are marked with the same number or letter, respectively, whenever they are connected to each other.

A chain is a set of one or more stones (necessarily of the same color) that are all connected to each other and that are not connected to any other stones. Although it is not necessary to define the word chain in order to state the rules, the concept is important for an understanding of the game.

For example, Black and White each have four chains in the diagram above. Black has one three-stone chain, one two-stone chain, and two one-stone chains. White has one four-stone chain and three one-stone chains.

It follows from the definitions that any stone on the board belongs to exactly one chain. Furthermore, saying that two distinct stones of the same color are connected is equivalent to saying that they belong to the same chain.

==== Liberties ====
In a given position, a liberty of a stone is an empty intersection adjacent to that stone or adjacent to a stone which is connected to that stone.

For example:

Go board, 5 by 5. Black stones: D4, C3. White stones: D5, A3, A2, B2, D2, B1. Moves: 1 black C2; 2 black D3; 3 black E4; 4 black C4; 5 black B3. Marks: uD tile at C5; urC tile at E5; letter E at B4; rB tile at E3; dA tile at C1.uDurCE4352rB1dA

In the above position, the points a, b, c, d, e, are the liberties of the black stone at 1.

- a is a liberty of Black 1 because it is adjacent to Black 1 itself.
- b is a liberty of Black 1 because it is adjacent to Black 2, which is connected to Black 1. Alternatively, b is adjacent to Black 3.
- c is a liberty of Black 1 because it is adjacent to Black 3, which is connected to Black 1.
- d is a liberty of Black 1 because it is adjacent to Black 4, which is connected to Black 1.
- e is a liberty of Black 1 because it is adjacent to Black 5, which is connected to Black 1. Alternatively, e is adjacent to Black 4.

The results are the same when determining the liberties of Black 2, or of any other stone belonging to the black chain.

Go board, 5 by 5. Moves: 1 black E1; 1 black E2; 1 black D2; 1 black C2; 2 black D4; 2 black E4; 2 black C4; 3 black B3; 4 white B1; 4 white A2; 4 white A3; 4 white B2; 5 white D1; 6 white D3; 7 white D5. Marks: uF tile at C5; urE tile at E5; lA tile at A4; letter G at B4; letter H at C3; rD tile at E3; dlB tile at A1; dC tile at C1.uF7urElAG22243H6rD44111dlB4dC51

In this position:

- The black stones marked 1 have the liberties c, d and h.
- The black stones marked 2 have the liberties d, e, f, g and h.
- The black stone marked 3 has the liberties g and h.
- The white stones marked 4 have the liberties a, b and c.
- The white stone marked 5 has the single liberty c.
- The white stone marked 6 has the liberties d and h.
- The white stone marked 7 has the liberties e and f.

Since the liberties of any two stones belonging to the same chain are identical, they are often called the liberties of that chain. For example, in the first diagram, the points a, b, c, d and e are the liberties of the lone black chain. In the second diagram, the liberties of the black chain in the lower right are c, d and h.

=== Play ===
==== Initial position ====
Rule 5. At the beginning of the game, the board is empty.

==== Alternation of turns ====
Rule 6. Black moves first. The players alternate thereafter.

What players may do when they move is the object of Rules 7 and 8.

==== Moving ====
Rule 7. On their turn, a player may either pass (by announcing "pass" and performing no action) or play. A play consists of the following steps (performed in the prescribed order):

- Step 1. Placing a stone of their color on an empty intersection (chosen subject to Rule 8 and, if it is in effect, to Optional Rule 7A).
- Step 2. Removing from the board any stones of their opponent's color that have no liberties.
- Step 3. Removing from the board any stones of their own color that have no liberties.

A move is defined as a play or a pass. Thus, on each turn a player moves once.

A player may pass on any move. Usually, passing is beneficial only at the end of the game, when all territory has been claimed and further moves would be useless, or even harmful to a player's position.

The following three sections discuss the successive steps of a play in greater detail, bearing in mind that, in view of Steps 2 and 3, all stones remaining on the board after any move must have at least one liberty.

==== Placing a stone on the board ====
Step 1 of a play. The player places a stone of their color on an empty intersection (chosen subject to Rule 8 and, if it is in effect, to Optional Rule 7A).

As indicated by the reference to Rules 8 and 7A (respectively the superko rule and prohibition of suicide, to be discussed later), there are some restrictions on the choice of point at which to play.

The following diagrams show a possible sequence of moves at the beginning of the game:

Go board, 5 by 5, empty.	Go board, 5 by 5. Moves: 1 black D4.1	Go board, 5 by 5. Black stones: D4. Moves: 2 white C3.2
Start	Black plays	White plays

The following diagrams show how Black might play later in the same game:

Go board, 5 by 5. Black stones: B4, D4, D1. White stones: D5, C3, A2.	Go board, 5 by 5. Black stones: B4, D4, D1. White stones: D5, C3, A2. Moves: 1 black C4.1
Before	After

Numbers are often used, as here, to indicate new moves in printed diagrams.

Once a stone has been played, it remains on the board in the same location, until the end of the game or until it is captured (removed from the board as part of Step 2 or Step 3 of a play).

==== Capture ====
Step 2 of a play. (After playing their stone) a player removes from the board any stones of their opponent's color that have no liberties.

The stones removed from the board are said to have been captured by the player moving.

The diagrams below show the capture of a white stone by Black. To begin with, the white stone has a single liberty at a. By playing a stone at a, Black removes the last remaining liberty of the white stone. It is subsequently removed from the board.

Go board, 5 by 5. Black stones: C4, B3, C2. White stones: C3. Marks: letter A at D3.A	Go board, 5 by 5. Black stones: C4, B3, C2. White stones: C3. Moves: 1 black D3.1	Go board, 5 by 5. Black stones: C4, B3, D3, C2.
Before	Black plays	After removal

At the edge of the board and especially in the corners, stones have fewer liberties to start with and are more easily captured.

Go board, 5 by 5. Black stones: A4, B3. White stones: A3. Marks: lA tile at A2.lA	Go board, 5 by 5. Black stones: A4, B3. White stones: A3. Moves: 1 black A2.1	Go board, 5 by 5. Black stones: A4, B3, A2.
Before	Black plays	After removal

Next, White captures a chain of four black stones by playing at a.

Go board, 5 by 5. Black stones: B4, B3, C3, C2. White stones: B5, A4, A3, D3, B2, D2, C1. Marks: letter A at C4.A	Go board, 5 by 5. Black stones: B4, B3, C3, C2. White stones: B5, A4, A3, D3, B2, D2, C1. Moves: 1 white C4.1	Go board, 5 by 5. White stones: B5, A4, C4, A3, D3, B2, D2, C1.
Before	White plays	After removal

Black captures the white chain by playing at a. The black stone is not captured, because the white stones are removed first, providing it with two liberties.

Go board, 5 by 5. Black stones: D3, E3, C2, C1. White stones: D2, E2, D1. Marks: drA tile at E1.drA	Go board, 5 by 5. Black stones: D3, E3, C2, C1. White stones: D2, E2, D1. Moves: 1 black E1.1	Go board, 5 by 5. Black stones: D3, E3, C2, C1. Moves: 1 black E1.1
Before	Black plays	After removal

Black captures the marked white chain at the edge of the board by playing at a. Then White captures the black stone in the corner by playing at b.

Go board, 5 by 5. Black stones: C4, C2, D2, B1. White stones: B3, C3, D3, E2, C1, D1. Marks: triangle on white stone at C1; triangle on white stone at D1; drA tile at E1.△△drA	Go board, 5 by 5. Black stones: C4, C2, D2, B1. White stones: B3, C3, D3, E2, C1, D1. Moves: 1 black E1. Marks: triangle on white stone at C1; triangle on white stone at D1.△△1	Go board, 5 by 5. Black stones: C4, C2, D2, B1. White stones: B3, C3, D3, E2. Moves: 1 black E1. Marks: dB tile at D1.dB1	Go board, 5 by 5. Black stones: C4, C2, D2, B1. White stones: B3, C3, D3, E2. Moves: 1 black E1; 2 white D1.21	Go board, 5 by 5. Black stones: C4, C2, D2, B1. White stones: B3, C3, D3, E2. Moves: 2 white D1.2
Before	Black plays	After capture	White plays	After capture

Here, White captures the three marked black chains by playing at a.

Go board, 5 by 5. Black stones: C5, D5, B3, D3, A2, C2, D2, A1, B1. White stones: A4, B4, D4, A3, C3, E3, E2, C1, D1. Marks: triangle on black stone at B3; triangle on black stone at D3; triangle on black stone at A2; letter A at B2; triangle on black stone at C2; triangle on black stone at D2; triangle on black stone at A1; triangle on black stone at B1.△△△A△△△△	Go board, 5 by 5. Black stones: C5, D5, B3, D3, A2, C2, D2, A1, B1. White stones: A4, B4, D4, A3, C3, E3, E2, C1, D1. Moves: 1 white B2. Marks: triangle on black stone at B3; triangle on black stone at D3; triangle on black stone at A2; triangle on black stone at C2; triangle on black stone at D2; triangle on black stone at A1; triangle on black stone at B1.△△△1△△△△	Go board, 5 by 5. Black stones: C5, D5. White stones: A4, B4, D4, A3, C3, E3, E2, C1, D1. Moves: 1 white B2.1
Before	White plays	After capture

==== Self-capture ====
Step 3 of a play. (After playing their stone and capturing any opposing stones) a player removes from the board any stones of their own color that have no liberties.

Optional Rule 7A. A play is illegal if one or more stones would be removed in Step 3 of that play.

The removal of one or more stones in Step 3 is called self-capture, or suicide. Most rulesets give effect to Optional Rule 7A, which prohibits it. This means that, in those rulesets, any play which under the basic rules would require a self-capture to be performed is illegal. For further information, see § Suicide below.

First an example which, it is emphasized, does not involve self-capture. When Black plays at a, the capture of the marked white stones results in the black chain at the bottom right acquiring liberties. This move is legal (with the same result) whatever the rules.

Go board, 5 by 5. Black stones: A3, B3, C3, D3, E3, A2, A1, D1, E1. White stones: B2, C2, D2, E2, B1. Marks: triangle on white stone at B2; triangle on white stone at C2; triangle on white stone at D2; triangle on white stone at E2; triangle on white stone at B1; dA tile at C1.△△△△△dA	Go board, 5 by 5. Black stones: A3, B3, C3, D3, E3, A2, A1, D1, E1. White stones: B2, C2, D2, E2, B1. Moves: 1 black C1. Marks: triangle on white stone at B2; triangle on white stone at C2; triangle on white stone at D2; triangle on white stone at E2; triangle on white stone at B1.△△△△△1	Go board, 5 by 5. Black stones: A3, B3, C3, D3, E3, A2, A1, D1, E1. Moves: 1 black C1.1
Before	Black plays	After capture

The previous example shows that it is important that Step 2 of a play (capture) precedes Step 3 (self-capture). If the order were reversed, then self-capture would occur here.

Self capture will never occur following a play that caused the capture of opposing stones, because the removal of opposing stone ensures that the newly placed stone has a liberty; any same-color chains that lost a liberty when it was placed include the new stone, and so also have the new liberty.

Now some examples of plays in which self-capture occurs. These moves would be illegal under the optional rule prohibiting suicide.

In this example, if Black plays at a, then the stone played by them is removed immediately. This move has the same effect on the position as a pass, though it would not allow White to end the game by passing next (Rule 9). The move is in any event illegal by Rule 8. (This is the positional superko rule. This move might be legal under other versions of the superko rule. See § Repetition below.)

Go board, 5 by 5. Black stones: C4, A3, C3. White stones: A2, B2, B1. Marks: dlA tile at A1.dlA	Go board, 5 by 5. Black stones: C4, A3, C3. White stones: A2, B2, B1. Moves: 1 black A1.1	Go board, 5 by 5. Black stones: C4, A3, C3. White stones: A2, B2, B1. Marks: dlA tile at A1.dlA
Before	Black plays	After self-capture; violates Rule 8

In the next example, Black plays at a, resulting in the self-capture of the marked black stones.

Go board, 5 by 5. Black stones: C4, B3, C2, A1, D1, E1. White stones: C5, C3, D3, E3, B2, E2, C1. Marks: triangle on black stone at C2; letter A at D2; triangle on black stone at D1; triangle on black stone at E1.△A△△	Go board, 5 by 5. Black stones: C4, B3, C2, A1, D1, E1. White stones: C5, C3, D3, E3, B2, E2, C1. Moves: 1 black D2. Marks: triangle on black stone at C2; triangle on black stone at D1; triangle on black stone at E1.△1△△	Go board, 5 by 5. Black stones: C4, B3, A1. White stones: C5, C3, D3, E3, B2, E2, C1. Marks: letter A at D2.A
Before	Black plays	After self-capture

==== Ko and Superko ====
Rule 8. A play is illegal if it would have the effect (after all steps of the play have been completed) of creating a position that has occurred previously in the game.

Though a pass is a kind of "move", it is not a "play". Therefore, Rule 8 never bars a player from passing. One consequence of Rule 8 is the so-called ko rule:

Consequence (ko rule). One may not play in such a way as to recreate the board position following one's previous move.

Whereas Rule 8 prohibits repetition of any previous position, the ko rule prohibits only immediate repetition.

The word ko, pronounced with a long "o", is taken from Japanese (劫, kō; usually written with katakana: コウ) and can mean both "threat" and "aeon" (from the Buddhist kalpa).

Rule 8 is known as the positional superko rule. The word "positional" is used to distinguish it from slightly different superko rules that are sometimes used. While the ko rule is observed in all forms of go, not all rulesets have a superko rule. The practical effects of the ko rule and the superko rule are similar; situations governed by the superko rule but not by the ko rule arise relatively infrequently. For further information, see § Repetition below.

The superko rule is designed to ensure the game eventually comes to an end, by preventing indefinite repetition of the same positions. While its purpose is similar to that of the threefold repetition rule of Western chess, it differs from it significantly in nature; the superko rule bans moves that would cause repetition, whereas Western chess allows such moves as one method of forcing a draw. It is more similar to the prohibition of moves which would repeat the position in Chinese Chess (Xiangqi). The ko rule has important strategic consequences in go.

Some examples follow in which Rule 8 applies. These examples cover only the most important case, namely the ko rule.

The first diagram shows the board immediately after White has played at 1, and it is Black's turn. Black captures the marked white stone by playing at a. If White responds by capturing at b with 3, the board position is identical to that immediately following White 1. White 3 is therefore prohibited by the ko rule.

Go board, 5 by 5. Black stones: B5, A4, B3, C2. White stones: C5, B4, D4, C3. Moves: 1 white D2. Marks: triangle on white stone at B4; letter A at C4.△A1	Go board, 5 by 5. Black stones: B5, A4, B3, C2. White stones: C5, D4, C3. Moves: 1 white D2; 2 black C4. Marks: letter B at B4.B21	Go board, 5 by 5. Black stones: B5, A4, B3, C2. White stones: C5, D4, C3. Moves: 1 white D2; 3 white B4.31
Black to move	Black captures	Illegal recapture

Another example of ko follows. Here, Black 3 is illegal by the ko rule.

Go board, 5 by 5. Black stones: C4, E2, D1. White stones: C3, D2, C1. Moves: 1 black B4. Marks: triangle on black stone at D1.1△	Go board, 5 by 5. Black stones: C4, E2. White stones: C3, D2, C1. Moves: 1 black B4; 2 white E1.12	Go board, 5 by 5. Black stones: C4, E2. White stones: C3, D2, C1. Moves: 1 black B4; 3 black D1.13
White to move	White captures	Illegal recapture

As noted in the section "Self-capture", Rule 8 prohibits the suicide of a single stone. This is something of a triviality since such a move would not be strategically useful. Taking it for granted that no suicide of a single stone has occurred, the ko rule can be engaged in only one situation:

Restatement of the ko rule: One may not capture just one stone if that stone was played on the previous move and that move also captured just one stone.

Furthermore, this can occur only when one plays in the location at which one's stone was captured in the previous move. The two points where consecutive captures might occur, but for the ko rule, are said to be in ko. For example, in the first two diagrams above, the points a and b are in ko.

The next two examples involve capture and immediate recapture, but the ko rule is not engaged, because either the first or second capture takes more than one stone.

In the first diagram below, White must prevent Black from playing at a, and does this with 1 in the second diagram. Black can capture the three stones in White 1's group by playing at b. Black does this with Black 2 in the third diagram. White may recapture Black 2 by playing at a again, because the resulting position, shown in the fourth diagram, has not occurred previously. It differs from the position after White 1 by the absence of the two marked white stones.

Go board, 5 by 5. Black stones: D5, E5, E4, D3, E3, B2, C2, E2, C1, D1, E1. White stones: B5, C5, A4, C4, D4, B3, C3, A1, B1. Marks: lA tile at A2; triangle on white stone at A1; triangle on white stone at B1.lA△△	Go board, 5 by 5. Black stones: D5, E5, E4, D3, E3, B2, C2, E2, C1, D1, E1. White stones: B5, C5, A4, C4, D4, B3, C3, A1, B1. Moves: 1 white A2. Marks: lB tile at A3; triangle on white stone at A1; triangle on white stone at B1.lB1△△	Go board, 5 by 5. Black stones: D5, E5, E4, D3, E3, B2, C2, E2, C1, D1, E1. White stones: B5, C5, A4, C4, D4, B3, C3. Moves: 2 black A3. Marks: lA tile at A2.2lA	Go board, 5 by 5. Black stones: D5, E5, E4, D3, E3, B2, C2, E2, C1, D1, E1. White stones: B5, C5, A4, C4, D4, B3, C3. Moves: 3 white A2. Marks: lB tile at A3.lB3
White to move	White sacrifices	Black captures	Recapture legal

In the first diagram below, it is White's turn. White must prevent Black from connecting the marked stones to the others by playing at a. The second diagram shows White's move. White is threatening to capture the marked black stones by playing at b. In the third diagram, Black plays at b to prevent this, capturing White 1. However, by playing at a again, White can capture Black 2's group. This is not barred by the ko rule because the resulting position, shown in the fourth diagram, differs from the one after White 1 by the absence of the marked black stones. This kind of capture is called a snapback.

Go board, 5 by 5. Black stones: A4, B4, B3, D3, E3, C2, D2, C1, E1. White stones: A5, B5, C5, D4, E4, A3, A2, B2. Marks: triangle on black stone at A4; triangle on black stone at B4; triangle on black stone at B3; letter A at C3.△△△A	Go board, 5 by 5. Black stones: A4, B4, B3, D3, E3, C2, D2, C1, E1. White stones: A5, B5, C5, D4, E4, A3, A2, B2. Moves: 1 white C3. Marks: triangle on black stone at A4; triangle on black stone at B4; letter B at C4; triangle on black stone at B3.△△B△1	Go board, 5 by 5. Black stones: A4, B4, B3, D3, E3, C2, D2, C1, E1. White stones: A5, B5, C5, D4, E4, A3, A2, B2. Moves: 2 black C4. Marks: triangle on black stone at A4; triangle on black stone at B4; triangle on black stone at B3; letter A at C3.△△2△A	Go board, 5 by 5. Black stones: D3, E3, C2, D2, C1, E1. White stones: A5, B5, C5, D4, E4, A3, A2, B2. Moves: 3 white C3. Marks: letter B at C4.B3
White to move	White sacrifices	Black captures	White snaps back

===== Ko threats =====
The next example is typical of real games. It shows how the ko rule can sometimes be circumvented by first playing elsewhere on the board.

The first diagram below shows the position after Black 1. White can capture the marked black stone by playing at a. The second diagram shows the resulting position. Black cannot immediately recapture at b because of the ko rule. So Black instead plays 3 in the third diagram. For reasons that will become clear, Black 3 is called a "ko threat".

Go board, 5 by 5. Black stones: C5, B4, C4, A3, B3, A2, C2, A1, B1. White stones: D5, E5, D4, C3, D3, D2, C1, D1. Moves: 1 black A5. Marks: letter A at B2; triangle on black stone at C2.1A△	Go board, 5 by 5. Black stones: C5, B4, C4, A3, B3, A2, A1, B1. White stones: D5, E5, D4, C3, D3, D2, C1, D1. Moves: 1 black A5; 2 white B2. Marks: letter B at C2.12B	Go board, 5 by 5. Black stones: C5, B4, C4, A3, B3, A2, A1, B1. White stones: D5, E5, D4, C3, D3, D2, C1, D1. Moves: 1 black A5; 2 white B2; 3 black E3. Marks: letter B at C2.132B
White to move	White captures	Black plays away from the ko

At this point, White could choose to connect at b, as shown in the first diagram below. However, this would be strategically unsound, because Black 5 would guarantee that Black could eventually capture the white group altogether, no matter how White played.

Go board, 5 by 5. Black stones: C5, B4, C4, A3, B3, A2, A1, B1. White stones: D5, E5, D4, C3, D3, D2, C1, D1. Moves: 1 black A5; 2 white B2; 3 black E3; 4 white C2.1324	Go board, 5 by 5. Black stones: C5, B4, C4, A3, B3, A2, A1, B1. White stones: D5, E5, D4, C3, D3, D2, C1, D1. Moves: 1 black A5; 2 white B2; 3 black E3; 4 white C2; 5 black E2.13245
White 4 is an error	Black takes advantage

Instead, White responds correctly to Black 3 with 4 in the first diagram below. Now, contrary to the situation after White 2, Black can legally play at b, because the resulting position, shown in the second diagram, has not occurred previously. It differs from the position after Black 1 because of the presence of Black 3 and White 4 on the board. Now White is prohibited from recapturing at a by the ko rule. White has no moves elsewhere on the board requiring an immediate reply from Black (ko threats), so White plays the less urgent move 6, capturing the black stone at 3, which could not have evaded capture even if White had waited. In the next diagram, Black connects at a before White has a chance to recapture. Both players pass and the game ends in this position.

Go board, 5 by 5. Black stones: C5, B4, C4, A3, B3, A2, A1, B1. White stones: D5, E5, D4, C3, D3, D2, C1, D1. Moves: 1 black A5; 2 white B2; 3 black E3; 4 white E2. Marks: letter B at C2.132B4	Go board, 5 by 5. Black stones: C5, B4, C4, A3, B3, A2, A1, B1. White stones: D5, E5, D4, C3, D3, D2, C1, D1. Moves: 1 black A5; 3 black E3; 4 white E2; 5 black C2. Marks: letter A at B2.13A54	Go board, 5 by 5. Black stones: C5, B4, C4, A3, B3, A2, A1, B1. White stones: D5, E5, D4, C3, D3, D2, C1, D1. Moves: 1 black A5; 4 white E2; 5 black C2; 6 white E4. Marks: letter A at B2.16A54	Go board, 5 by 5. Black stones: C5, B4, C4, A3, B3, A2, A1, B1. White stones: D5, E5, D4, C3, D3, D2, C1, D1. Moves: 1 black A5; 4 white E2; 5 black C2; 6 white E4; 7 black B2.16754
White replies to threat	Black recaptures legally	Ko bars recapture at a	Black connects

=== End ===
Rule 9. The game ends when both players have passed consecutively. The final position (the position later used to score the game) is the position on the board at the time the players pass consecutively.

Since the position on the board at the time of the first two consecutive passes is the one used to score the game, Rule 9 can be said to require the players to "play the game out".

Under Rule 9, players must for example capture enemy stones even when it may be obvious to both players that they cannot evade capture. Otherwise the stones are not considered to have been captured. Because Rule 9 differs significantly from the various systems for ending the game used in practice, a word must be said about them.

These systems, which are discussed more fully in § Counting phase below, generally allow the game to end as soon as it is clear to the players which stones would remain on the board if the game continued. The precise means of achieving this varies widely by ruleset, and in some cases has strategic implications. These systems often use passing in a way that is incompatible with Rule 9. For players, knowing the conventions surrounding the manner of ending the game in a particular ruleset can therefore have practical importance.

Under Chinese rules, and more generally under any using the area scoring system, a player who played the game out as if Rule 9 were in effect would not be committing any strategic errors by doing so. They would, however, likely be viewed as unsportsmanlike for prolonging the game unnecessarily. On the other hand, under a territory scoring system like that of the Japanese rules, playing the game out in this way would in most cases be a strategic mistake.

==== Territory ====
Definition. In the final position, an empty intersection is said to belong to a player's territory if all stones adjacent to it or to an empty intersection connected to it are of that player's color.

Note: Unless the entire board is empty, the second condition – that there be at least one stone of the kind required – is always satisfied and can be ignored.

A point can never belong to both players' territories.

On the other hand, it may well happen that an empty intersection belongs to neither player's territory. In that case the point is said to be neutral territory. There are rarely any more than a handful of neutral points at the end of a game; in the majority of cases, there are none at all.

Japanese and Korean rules count some points as neutral where the basic rules, like Chinese rules, would not. For more on this, see § Seki.

In order to understand the definition of territory, it is instructive to apply it first to a position of a kind that might arise before the end of a game.

Go board, 9 by 9. Black stones: C9, E9, B8, D8, B7, C7, C6, D6, J6, C5, H5, J5, G4, J4, C3, F3, G3, H3, J3, C2, G2, D1, G1. White stones: E8, H8, D7, E7, J7, E6, G6, H6, D5, G5, E4, F4, E3, D2, E2, F2, J2, F1, H1. Marks: uI tile at D9; uE tile at F9; uD tile at H9; urC tile at J9; letter H at C8; X at B4; X at C4; letter B at D4; letter J at H4; X at B3; X at B2; letter F at H2; dX tile at B1; dA tile at C1; dG tile at E1; drK tile at J1.uIuEuDurCHXXBJXXFdXdAdGdrK

The point a is adjacent to a black stone. Therefore, a does not belong to White's territory. However, a is connected to b (by the path shown in the diagram, among others), which is adjacent to a white stone. Therefore, a does not belong to Black's territory either. In conclusion, a is neutral territory.

The point c is connected to d, which is adjacent to a white stone. But c is also connected to e, which is adjacent to a black stone. Therefore, c is neutral territory.

Similarly, the points f and g are neutral territory.

On the other hand, h is adjacent only to black stones and is not connected to any other points. Therefore, h is black territory. For the same reason, i and j are black territory, and k is white territory.

It is because there is so much territory left to be claimed that skilled players would not end the game in the previous position. The game might continue with White playing 1 in the next diagram. If the game ended in this new position, the marked intersections would become White's territory, since they would no longer be connected to an empty intersection adjacent to a black stone.

Go board, 9 by 9. Black stones: C9, E9, B8, D8, B7, C7, C6, D6, J6, C5, H5, J5, G4, J4, C3, F3, G3, H3, J3, C2, G2, D1, G1. White stones: E8, H8, D7, E7, J7, E6, G6, H6, D5, G5, E4, F4, E3, D2, E2, F2, J2, F1, H1. Moves: 1 white F9. Marks: uX tile at G9; uX tile at H9; urX tile at J9; X at F8; X at G8; rX tile at J8; X at F7; X at G7; X at H7; X at F6; X at E5; X at F5.1uXuXurXXXrXXXXXXX

The game might end with the moves shown below. In the final position, the points marked a are black territory and the points marked b are white territory. The point marked c is the only neutral territory left.

Go board, 9 by 9. Black stones: C9, E9, B8, D8, B7, C7, C6, D6, J6, C5, H5, J5, G4, J4, C3, F3, G3, H3, J3, C2, G2, D1, G1. White stones: F9, E8, H8, D7, E7, J7, E6, G6, H6, D5, G5, E4, F4, E3, D2, E2, F2, J2, F1, H1. Moves: 1 black D9; 2 white C4; 3 black B4; 4 white D4; 5 black C1; 6 white D3; 7 black E1. Marks: ulA tile at A9; uA tile at B9; uB tile at G9; uB tile at H9; urB tile at J9; lA tile at A8; letter A at C8; letter B at F8; letter B at G8; rB tile at J8; lA tile at A7; letter B at F7; letter B at G7; letter B at H7; lA tile at A6; letter A at B6; letter B at F6; lA tile at A5; letter A at B5; letter B at E5; letter B at F5; lA tile at A4; letter A at H4; lA tile at A3; letter A at B3; lA tile at A2; letter A at B2; letter C at H2; dlA tile at A1; dA tile at B1; drB tile at J1.ulAuA1uBuBurBlAABBrBlABBBlAABlAABBlA324AlAA6lAACdlAdA57drB

In Japanese and Korean rules, the point in the lower right corner and the point marked a on the right side of the board would fall under the seki exception, in which they would be considered neutral territory. (See § Seki below.)

==== Area ====
Definition. In the final position, an intersection is said to belong to a player's area if either: 1) it belongs to that player's territory; or 2) it is occupied by a stone of that player's color.

Consider once again the final position shown in the last diagram of the section "Territory". The following diagram illustrates the area of each player in that position. Points in a player's area are occupied by a stone of the corresponding color. The lone neutral point does not belong to either player's area.

Go board, 9 by 9. Black stones: A9, B9, C9, D9, E9, A8, B8, C8, D8, A7, B7, C7, A6, B6, C6, D6, J6, A5, B5, C5, H5, J5, A4, B4, G4, H4, J4, A3, B3, C3, F3, G3, H3, J3, A2, B2, C2, G2, A1, B1, C1, D1, E1, G1. White stones: F9, G9, H9, J9, E8, F8, G8, H8, J8, D7, E7, F7, G7, H7, J7, E6, F6, G6, H6, D5, E5, F5, G5, C4, D4, E4, F4, D3, E3, D2, E2, F2, J2, F1, H1, J1.

==== Score ====
Definition. A player's score is the number of intersections in their area in the final position.

For example, if a game ended as in the last diagram in the section "Territory", the score would be: Black 44, White 36. The players' scores add to 80. The difference between this and the 81 intersections on a 9 × 9 board is accounted for by the one point of neutral territory.

The scoring system described here is known as area scoring, and is the one used in the Chinese rules. Different scoring systems exist. These determine the same winner in most instances. See the Scoring systems section below.

==== Winner ====
Rule 10. If one player has a higher score than the other, then that player wins. Otherwise, the game is drawn.

In the previous example, Black wins by eight points.

Margin of victory does not matter; winning by one point is as good as winning by 100 points.

== Scoring systems ==
The most prominent difference between rulesets is the scoring method. There are two main scoring systems: territory scoring (the Japanese method) and area scoring (the Chinese method). A third system (stone scoring) is rarely used today but was used in the past and has historical and theoretical interest.

Care should be taken to distinguish between scoring systems and counting methods. Only two scoring systems are in wide use, but there are two ways of counting using "area" scoring.

=== Territory scoring ===
In territory scoring (including Japanese and Korean rules) a player's score is determined by the number of empty locations that player has surrounded minus the number of stones their opponent has captured.

Furthermore, Japanese and Korean rules have special provisions in cases of seki, though this is not a necessary part of a territory scoring system. (See "Seki" below.)

Typically, counting is done by having each player place the prisoners they have taken into the opponent's territory and rearranging the remaining territory into easy-to-count shapes.

Territory scoring was how very old Chinese Go games were scored; Chinese style gradually switched to area scoring during the Yuan dynasty and Ming dynasty of the 13th–16th centuries.

=== Area scoring ===
In area scoring (including Chinese rules), a player's score is determined by the number of stones that player has on the board plus the empty area surrounded by that player's stones.

There are several common ways in which to count the score (all these ways will always result in the same winner):

- The oldest counting method is as follows: At the end of the game, all white stones are removed from the board, and the players use black stones to fill the entirety of the black territory. Score is determined by counting the black stones. Since the board contains 361 intersections, black must have 181 or more stones to win. This method is still widely used in Mainland China.
- Around 1975, Taiwanese player and industrialist Ing Chang-ki invented a method of counting now known as Ing counting. Each player begins the game with exactly 180 stones (Ing also invented special stone containers that count each player's stones). At the end, all stones are placed on the board. One vacant intersection will remain, appearing in the winner's area; the number of stones of one color in the other color's area will indicate the margin of victory.

=== Stone scoring ===
In stone scoring, a player's score is the number of stones that player has on the board. Territory and prisoners are not counted. Play typically continues until both players have nearly filled their territories, leaving only the two eyes necessary to prevent capture.

Stone scoring was likely the original method of Go scoring. It was described in a manuscript from Dunhuang from the Northern Zhou Dynasty (557–581), which is the oldest known Go manual. When Go reached Japan about 700 AD, the scoring system had been already streamlined—stone scoring had been replaced by territory scoring using the so-called group tax. Stone scoring survived in some regions of China until the beginning of the 20th century.

=== Group tax ===
Group tax means deducting one point for every eye needed for a group to survive. It equals two points for living groups and one point for groups in seki with one eye.

Group tax was a relic of stone scoring. Stone scoring includes it automatically since every (living) group needs two eyes and hence they cannot all be filled. Group tax was used with territory scoring both in Japan and in China. In Japan it was abandoned because it made territory scoring convoluted. In China during the Ming Dynasty a new scoring system was devised: area scoring with group tax. The new system was equivalent to stone scoring. The group tax is likely the reason why eyes in seki aren't scored in the Japanese Rules.

=== Attempts at reconciling the scoring systems ===
If the game ends with both players having played the same number of stones, then the result will be identical in territory and area scoring: indeed, the difference of stones on the board will equal the difference of prisoners and hence the difference of score will be the same.

AGA rules call for a player to give the opponent a stone ("passing stone") when passing, and for White to play last (passing a third time if necessary). Because of passing stones, when one player passes and the second makes a move the difference of prisoners changes exactly the same way as the difference of stones on the board.

White's second pass is crucial when Black takes last dame. Since Black takes the last dame he made 1 move more than White. By taking the last dame Black gets 1 point under area scoring, but 0 points under territory scoring. To make territory and area scoring equal we need to give Black 1 additional point in territory scoring. Hence White's second pass. Thus, in AGA rules, the result using a territory system is always the same as it would be using an area scoring system.

The results for stone and area scoring are identical if both sides have the same number of groups. As mentioned above, the "group tax" used in some older rulesets of two points per group gave identical results to both territory and stone scoring.

=== Counting phase ===
Customarily, when players agree that there are no useful moves left (most often by passing in succession), they attempt to agree which groups are alive and which are dead. If disagreement arises, then under Chinese rules the players simply play on.

However, under Japanese rules, the game is already considered to have ended. The players attempt to ascertain which groups of stones would remain if both players played perfectly from that point on. (These groups are said to be alive.) In addition, this play is done under rules in which kos are treated differently from ordinary play. If the players reach an incorrect conclusion, then they both lose.

The Japanese rules are accompanied by a lengthy commentary with examples of when groups are considered alive and when they are dead. These examples do not cover every situation that may arise. Some difficult cases not entirely determined by the rules and existing precedent must be adjudicated by a go tribunal.

The need for the Japanese rules to address the definition of life and death follows from the fact that in the Japanese rules, scores are calculated by territory rather than by area. The rules cannot simply require a player to play on in order to prove that an opponent's group is dead, since playing in their own territory to do this would reduce their score. Therefore, the game is divided into a phase of ordinary play, and a phase of determination of life and death (which according to the Japanese rules is not technically part of the game).

== Optional rules ==
=== Compensation ===
To allow players of different skills to compete fairly, handicaps and komi are used. These are considered a part of the game and, unlike in many other games, they do not distort the nature of the game. Players at all levels employ handicaps to make the game more balanced.

==== Komi ====
In an "even", or non-handicap game, Black's initial advantage of moving first can be offset by komi (compensation points): a fixed number of points, agreed before the game, added to White's score at the end of the game. The correct value of komi (to properly compensate for Black's advantage) is controversial, but common values are 5.5, 6.5, or 7.5; the fractional value avoids a tied game. In a handicap game, komi is usually set to 0.5 (i.e., White wins if the game is tied). A handicap game with a handicap of 1 starts like an even game, but White receives only 0.5 komi (i.e., a White player who is stronger by one rank is handicapped only by Black's first-move advantage).

Before the 20th century, there was no komi system. When the great Shusaku was once asked how an important game came out, he said simply, "I had Black", implying that victory was inevitable. As more people became aware of the significance of Black having the first move, komi was introduced. The amount of komi has been increased periodically based on analysis of game results indicating >50% wins for Black; each time, after a period of adjustment Black has again begun winning >50% of games. When it was introduced in Japanese Professional games, it was 4.5 points. However, Black still had a better chance to win, so komi was increased to 5.5 points in 1974. In 2002, the Japanese Go Association again increased the komi value to 6.5.

==== Handicap ====
Handicaps are given by allowing the weaker player to take Black and declaring White's first few moves as mandatory "pass" moves. In practice, this means that Black's first move is to place a certain number of stones (usually the number is equal to the difference in the players' ranks) on the board before allowing White to play. Traditionally, the hoshi ("star points") – strategically important intersections marked with small dots—are used to place these handicap stones. On the 19 × 19 board, there are nine star points: at the four 4–4 points in the corners, at the four 4–10 points along the sides, and one at the 10–10 point (the centre of the board, or tengen in Japanese). Smaller boards such as the 13 × 13 and 9 × 9 also have star points. The 13 × 13 has 9 at the 4–4 points, 4–7 points, and the center. The 9 × 9 board has only 5 points: the 3–3 points and the center.

When Black is only one rank weaker (also known as one stone weaker, due to the close relationship between ranks and the handicap system), Black is given the advantage of playing Black, perhaps without komi, but without any mandatory White passes. For rank differences from two through nine stones, the appropriate number of handicap stones are used. Beyond nine stones, the difference in strength between the players is usually considered great enough that the game is more a lesson where White teaches Black than a competition. Thus, nine stones is the nominal upper limit on handicap stones regardless of the difference in rank (although higher numbers of stones, up to 41 stones in some cases, may be given if the teacher wants a greater challenge).

== Variations ==
Go was already an ancient game before its rules were codified, and therefore, although the basic rules and strategy are universal, there are regional variations in some aspects of the rules.

=== Seki ===
For defining this notion, it is useful to introduce some additional terminology:

Terminology

- An eye is a connected group of one (or more) empty intersections entirely surrounded by a chain or chains of stones of one color.
- A chain of one color is independently alive if it is (or can be made to be) adjacent to two eyes.

These definitions are given only loosely, since a number of complications arise when attempts are made to formalize the notion of life and death.

A group of stones of one color is said to be alive by seki (or in seki) if it is not independently alive, yet cannot be captured by the opponent.

Go board, 5 by 5. Black stones: C5, D5, E5, C4, D4, E4, D3, D2, E2, D1, E1. White stones: A5, B5, A4, B4, A3, C3, A2, B2, C2, A1, B1. Marks: circle at C1.

For example, in the diagram above, the black and white groups each have only one eye. Hence they are not independently alive. However, if either Black or White were to play at the circled point, the other side would then capture their group by playing in its eye. In this case both the black and white groups are alive by seki.

In the diagram above, the circled point is not surrounded by stones of a single color, and accordingly is not counted as territory for either side (irrespective of ruleset). In more complex cases, as here,

Go board, 5 by 5. Black stones: C5, E5, C4, D4, E4, A3, B3, B2, A1, B1. White stones: A5, B4, C3, D3, E3, C2, E2, C1, D1. Marks: circle at D5; circle at A2.

a vacant point may be surrounded by a group of a single color which is in seki. According to Japanese and Korean rules, such a point is nonetheless treated as neutral territory for scoring purposes. Generally, the Japanese and Korean rules only count a vacant point as territory for one color if it is surrounded by a group or groups of that color that are independently alive.

=== Repetition ===
The major division in rules to prevent repetition is between the simple ko rule and the super ko rule: the simple ko rule (typically part of the Japanese ruleset) prevents repetition of the last previous board position, while the superko rule (typically part of Chinese derived rulesets, including those of the AGA and the New Zealand Go Society) prevents repetition of any previous position. In both cases, the rule does not, however, prohibit passing.

The super ko rule is differentiated into situational super ko (SSK, in which the "position" that cannot be recreated includes knowledge of whose turn it is) and positional super ko (PSK, which ignores whose turn it is). Natural situational super ko (NSSK) is a variant in which what matters is not whose turn it is, but who created the position (i. e., who made the last move other than a pass.)

The Ing rules feature a complicated distinction between "fighting" and "disturbing" ko.

Situations other than ko which could lead to an endlessly repeating position are rare enough that many frequent players never encounter them; their treatment depends on what ruleset is being used. The simple ko rule generally requires the inclusion of additional rules to handle other undesirable repetitions (e.g. long cycles which can lead to no result where the game must be replayed).

The first position below is an example of a triple ko, taken, with minor changes, from Ikeda Toshio's On the Rules of Go.

Go board, 9 by 9. Black stones: A8, B8, C8, D8, E8, F8, G8, G7, E6, G6, H6, B5, D5, F5, H5, A4, B4, C4, D4, E4, F4, H4, J4. White stones: A7, B7, C7, D7, E7, F7, B6, D6, F6, A5, C5, G5, G4, B3, C3, D3, E3, F3, G3, H3, J3, A2, B2, D2, H2, D1, H1.	Go board, 9 by 9. Black stones: A8, B8, C8, D8, E8, F8, G8, G7, E6, G6, H6, B5, D5, F5, H5, A4, B4, C4, D4, E4, F4, H4, J4, C2, E2, F2, G2, A1, B1, E1, G1, J1. White stones: A7, B7, C7, D7, E7, F7, B6, D6, F6, A5, C5, G5, G4, B3, C3, D3, E3, F3, G3, H3, J3, A2, B2, D2, H2, D1, H1.	Go board, 9 by 9. Black stones: A8, B8, C8, D8, E8, F8, G8, G7, E6, G6, H6, B5, D5, F5, H5, A4, B4, C4, D4, E4, F4, H4, J4. White stones: A7, B7, C7, D7, E7, F7, B6, D6, F6, A5, C5, G5, G4, B3, C3, D3, E3, F3, G3, H3, J3, A2, B2, D2, F2, H2, B1, C1, D1, E1, F1, G1, H1, J1.
Triple ko; Black kills group (PSK, SSK)	Result if White moves first (NSSK)	White wins here with first move. (NSSK)

Without a superko rule, this position would lead to an endless cycle, and hence "no result", a draw, or some other outcome determined by the rules.

For simplicity, when discussing this position using the superko rule, it is assumed that the last move placed a stone in a position unoccupied since the beginning of the game, and away from the ko. Under positional and situational super ko, Black captures the white group. This is also the case with natural situational super ko if it is Black's turn. If it is White's turn however, then NSSK exhibits odd behavior. White can get a seki by passing, but only at the cost of allowing Black unlimited moves away from the ko. If White insists on saving their group, the final position might look like the second diagram. On the other hand, with the first move (which should be a pass), White wins by two points in the third position using NSSK (assuming area scoring). Black's best response, in terms of maximizing their score, is a pass.

=== Suicide ===
Currently, most major rulesets forbid playing such that a play results in that player's own stones being removed from the board. Some rulesets (notably, New Zealand derived rules and Ing rules) allow suicide of more than one stone. Suicide of more than one stone rarely occurs in real games, but in certain circumstances, a suicidal move may threaten the opponent's eye shape, yielding a ko threat.

=== Compensation ===
The major rulesets differ in how handicap stones are placed on the board: free placement (Chinese), where stones can be placed anywhere (as if the player's turn repeated); and fixed placement (Japanese), where tradition dictates the stone placement (according to the handicap). Area scoring rules and territory scoring rules also differ in the compensation given for each handicap stone (since each handicap stone would count under area scoring). Komi (compensation for going second) also varies, ranging from several fixed values (commonly 5.5, 6.5, or 7.5) to various meta-games to determine a value (notably Auction Komi).

=== Board sizes ===
Most Go is played on a 19 × 19 board, but 13 × 13 and 9 × 9 are also popular sizes. Historically other board sizes were commonly used (notably 17 × 17, a predecessor of the 19 × 19 board in ancient China). Go is also sometimes played on various novelty sized boards as small as 5 × 5 and larger than 19 × 19. All board sizes have an odd number of lines to ensure that there is a center point, possibly to make mirror Go a less attractive strategy. Generally all rules apply to all board sizes, with the exception of handicaps and compensation (whose placement and values vary according to board size).

=== Scoring ===
Historically in China a scoring system was used that penalized the player who had the greatest number of unconnected live groups of stones. On the basis that every group needs two eyes to be alive, and that the two eyes could not be filled in, two points were deducted from the score for each live group at the end of the game. This was known as the "cutting penalty" in Chinese, and is sometimes referred to as the "group tax" in English. This rule is not applied in modern Chinese scoring.

=== Issues ===
In general, there are three closely related issues which have to be addressed by each variation of the rules.

First, how to ensure that the game comes to an end. Players must be able to settle unsettled situations rather than going around in circles. And neither player should be able to drag the game out indefinitely either to avoid losing or to irritate the other player. Possible methods include: the super-ko rule, time control, or placing an upper bound on the number of moves. This is also affected by the scoring method used since territory scoring penalizes extended play after the boundaries of the territories have been settled.

Second, how to decide which player won the game; and whether draws (jigo) should be allowed. Possible terms to include in the score are: komi, prisoners captured during the game, stones in dead groups on the board at the end of the game, points of territory controlled by a player but not occupied by their stones, their living stones, the number of passes, and the number of disjoint living groups on the board.

Third, how to determine whether a group of stones is alive or dead at the end of the game, and whether protective plays are necessary; e.g., connecting a group which could be captured if all neutral territory were filled. If the players are unable to agree, some rules provide for arbitration using virtual attempts to capture the group. Others allow play to resume until the group is captured or clearly immortal.

== Rulesets ==
There are many official rulesets for playing Go. These vary in significant ways, such as the method used to count the final score, and in very small ways, such as whether the two kinds of "bent four in the corner" positions result in removal of the dead stones automatically at the end of the game or whether the position must be played out, and whether the players must start the game with a fixed number of stones or with an unbounded number.

Rulesets include Japanese, Chinese, Korean, the American Go Association, Ing, and New Zealand.

=== Comparison table ===
	Japanese/Korean	AGA	Chinese	Ing	New Zealand
Scoring	Territory	Territory or Area (score is always equal with either method due to AGA provisions)	Area	Area (counting is done with a fill-in method using "Ing bowls")	Area
Komi	6.5	7.5	7.5	de facto 7.5 (komi is 8, but black wins in jigo)	7
Superko	No result unless one side breaks the loop	Repetitions are forbidden	Repetitions are forbidden in theory, but the referee may declare a draw	Repetitions are restricted by special ko rule	Repetitions are forbidden
Points in a seki	Not counted	Counted	Counted	Counted	Counted
Suicide	Illegal	Illegal	Illegal	Legal	Legal
Ending the game	2 passes	2 or 3 passes, with white being the last to pass. Opponent receives one prisoner for each pass.	2 passes	2 passes	2 passes
Resolution of disputes at end	Hypothetical play and then restoring the board to the end position	Game resumption	Over the board: tournament moderator; Online: game resumption	Game resumption	Game resumption
Placement of handicap stones	Fixed	Fixed	Free	Free	Free
Compensation for handicap stones	None	n − 1 points if counting by area	n points	n points	None

=== Japanese rules ===
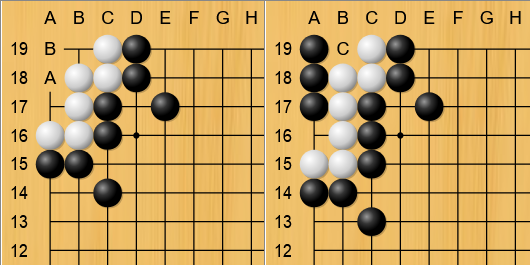
On the left: the so called bent four in the corner without outside liberties. If white plays first, he plays at A and lives unconditonally. If it's black's turn, he plays at A, white plays at B and there is a ko fight. If white doesn't have enough ko threats, loses the fight and dies. On the right: it may seem that the groups are in seki, but white cannot prevent black from forming a bent four in the corner by playing at C. If black removed all ko threats beforehand, the white dies.

These are rules used in Japan and, with some minor differences, in Korea. They are in wide use throughout the West, sometimes known as "territory" rules. The scoring is based on territory and captured stones. At the end of the game, prisoners are placed in the opponent's territory and players rearrange the board so that territories are easy to count, leaving a visual image resembling the game, which some players find aesthetically pleasing. There is no superko (the triple ko leads to an undecided game). Suicide is always forbidden. Komi is 6.5.

Disagreements about whether certain groups are alive or dead, and about the counting of territory, are resolved in a notoriously complex manner (see § Counting phase above).

Japanese rules count vacant points in a seki as neutral, even if they are entirely surrounded by stones of a single color.

==== World Amateur Go Championship rules ====
The rules of the World Amateur Go Championship are based on the Japanese rules, with some differences. These rules are sanctioned by the International Go Federation.

=== Chinese rules ===
This is the other major set of rules in widespread use, also known as "area" rules. At the end, one player (usually Black) fills in all of their captured territory, and the other (White) stones are removed from the board. Prisoners do not count. Black stones are then arranged in groups of ten—eighteen such groups, plus half the komi, plus at least one additional stone = victory for Black. So for example with a komi of 7.5 points, under Chinese rules Black needs at least 184.5 (but usually 185 since half points are not that common) stones on the board at the end to win. Komi is usually 7.5 points.

In the Chinese rules, there is no penalty for playing within one's territory at the end of the game, for example to kill and remove dead enemy groups. Thus passing to signal that one believes that there are no more useful moves may be conceived as simply being a convenient device to accelerate the end of the game – assuming one is not mistaken. The result will always be the same as if the game had been played out entirely.

The fact that disagreements can be resolved by playing on means that Chinese-style rules can be implemented easily without the need for the rules to define what is meant by "living" and "dead" groups.

==== World Mind Sports Games rules ====
The rules of the First World Mind Sports Games, held in Beijing in October 2008, are based on the Chinese rules, but are simpler, and represent a compromise with the Japanese and Korean rules. These rules are sanctioned by the International Go Federation.

These rules use area scoring, and have a komi of 6.5. Black has one further point deducted in the event that White was the first player to pass in the game. This last feature is a compromise with Japanese and Korean rules in that it is similar, in terms of its strategic consequences, to territory scoring. Unlike the Chinese rules, this rule will generally impose a penalty for an additional move at the end of the game within one's territory. In particular, the result of the game may differ by up to a point from what it would have been had both players played it out.

The game normally ends after two consecutive passes, but in the event of disagreement about the score, play resumes in the original order. Once this resumption has occurred, then when two consecutive passes do eventually occur again, play stops and all stones left on the board are deemed alive. Thus after a single disagreement, the players are required to play the game out entirely. (By this point in the game, there is no longer any penalty for making "useless" plays within one's territory to kill dead enemy groups, since the one-point advantage for passing first has already been attributed to one player or the other by the first set of consecutive passes.)

Suicide is forbidden in these rules. Unlike the Japanese rules, the WMSG rules apply superko (specifically, positional superko).

=== AGA rules ===
These are used by the American Go Association. Some special rules (like giving the opponent a prisoner when passing) are added, which make the area scoring and territory scoring equal.

The Federation Française de Go also uses AGA rules. The British Go Association also adopted the AGA rules, with some minor departures, in April 2008.

=== Ing rules ===
Ing rules were developed by the Taiwanese industrialist Ing Chang-Ki and are currently supported by the Ing Foundation, which sponsors the prestigious Ing Cup, where it has used these rules since 1977. The current version of the rules dates from 1996.

The scoring is basically the same as area scoring, but is done with a special technique involving "Ing bowls". Both players must start with exactly 180 stones; the Ing Foundation makes special bowls that allow players to count their stones easily. Prisoners come back to the owner. After the game finishes, both players fill their empty territory with their stones. The one that gets rid of all of them is the winner. Black pays White eight points (komi) by allowing four white stones in Black's territory to be placed at the beginning of the counting phase. As Black wins ties it is 7.5 in effect. The ko rule makes a distinction between "fighting" and "disturbing" ko. Multi-stone suicide is allowed.

=== New Zealand rules ===
Area scoring is used. Multi-stone suicide is allowed. A stone may not be played such that the resulting board position repeats the whole board position as it was after any of that player's previous moves. (Some people call this a "superko" rule.) Komi is 7 points (so draws with equal scores are possible).

=== Differences ===
In most cases the differences between the rulesets are negligible. The choice of ruleset rarely results in a difference in score of more than one point, and the strategy and tactics of the game are mostly unaffected by the ruleset used. Differences come from passing moves (if white and black did not pass the same number of times) and from seki scoring.

== See also ==
- Go (board game)
- Go concepts
- Go strategy and tactics
- International Go Federation
