= Trigger strategy =

Class of strategies employed in a repeated non-cooperative game

In game theory, a trigger strategy is any of a class of strategies employed in a repeated non-cooperative game. A player using a trigger strategy initially cooperates but punishes the opponent if a certain level of defection (i.e., the trigger) is observed.

The level of punishment and the sensitivity of the trigger vary with different trigger strategies.

== Trigger strategies ==
- Grim trigger (the punishment continues indefinitely after the other player defects just once)
- Tit for tat (the punishment continues as long as the other player defects)
- Tit for two tats (a more forgiving variant of tit for tat)
