= New Zealand Go Society =

New Zealand national governing body for Go

New Zealand Go Society (NZGS) is the national governing body for the ancient oriental sport of Go in the country of New Zealand. It has been a member of the International Go Federation since 1982.

== Aims ==
The aims of the society are:

- to publish Go news to New Zealanders,
- to organise the annual New Zealand Go Congress tournament,
- to maintain a points system for members,
- to sends a New Zealand representative to the World Amateur Go Championship (WAGC) annually,
- to run a bookshop (selling books and Go equipment) with special deals for members.

== New Zealand rules ==
NZGS adopts the New Zealand Rules of Go, which is one of major rulesets of Go in the world, and the basis of the Tromp-Taylor Rules, proposed by John Tromp and Bill Taylor.
