= Robert Axelrod (political scientist) =

American political scientist

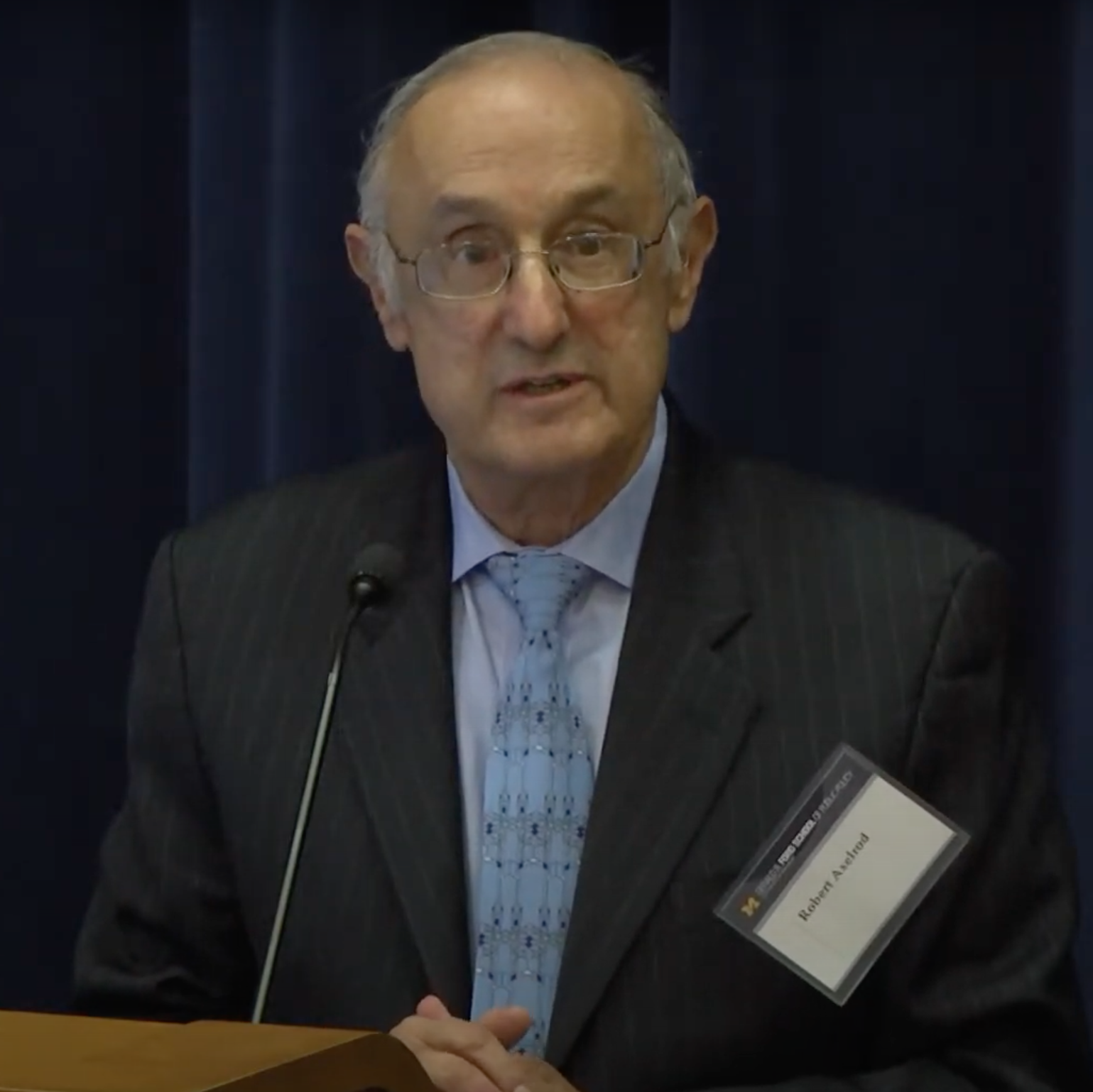
- Axelrod in 2019
- Born: Robert Marshall Axelrod; May 27, 1943 (age 83); Chicago, Illinois, U.S.
- Awards: Johan Skytte Prize (2013); National Medal of Science (2014)

Academic background
- Education: University of Chicago (BA); Yale University (MA, PhD)
- Thesis: Conflict of Interest: A Theory of Divergent Goals with Applications to Politics (1969)
- Doctoral advisor: Hayward Alker

Academic work
- Discipline: Political science
- Sub-discipline: Policy studies
- Institutions: University of California, Berkeley; University of Michigan

Robert Marshall Axelrod (born May 27, 1943) is an American political scientist. He is Professor of Political Science and Public Policy at the University of Michigan where he has been since 1974. He is best known for his interdisciplinary work on the evolution of cooperation. His current research interests include complexity theory (especially agent-based modeling), international security, and cyber security. His research includes innovative approaches to explaining conflict of interest, the emergence of norms, how game theory is used to study cooperation, and cross-disciplinary studies on evolutionary processes.

== Biography ==
Axelrod received his B.A. in mathematics from the University of Chicago in 1964. In 1969, he received his Ph.D. in political science from Yale University for a thesis entitled Conflict of interest: a theory of divergent goals with applications to politics. He taught at the University of California, Berkeley, from 1968 until 1974.

Among his honors and awards are membership in the National Academy of Sciences, a five-year MacArthur Prize Fellowship, the Newcomb Cleveland Prize of the American Association for the Advancement of Sciences for an outstanding contribution to science. He was elected a Fellow of the American Academy of Arts and Sciences in 1985. In 1990 Axelrod was awarded the inaugural NAS Award for Behavioral Research Relevant to the Prevention of Nuclear War from the National Academy of Sciences. He is also a faculty affiliate of the Science, Technology, and Public Policy (STPP) Program at the University of Michigan Gerald R. Ford School of Public Policy.

In the late 1970s and early 1980s, Axelrod gained international fame for his research into the Iterated Prisoner's Dilemma (IPD). Seeking to understand how cooperation could emerge among self-interested agents, he organized two computer tournaments where experts in game theory, economics, and mathematics submitted strategies to compete against one another. This work was detailed in his 1984 book, The Evolution of Cooperation.

Recently Axelrod has consulted and lectured on promoting cooperation and harnessing complexity for the United Nations, the World Bank, the U.S. Department of Defense, and various organizations serving health care professionals, business leaders, and K–12 educators.

Axelrod was the President of the American Political Science Association (APSA) for the 2006–2007 term. He focused his term on the theme of interdisciplinarity.

In May 2006, Axelrod was awarded an honorary degree by Georgetown University. In 2013, he was awarded the Johan Skytte Prize in Political Science. In 2014, President Barack Obama presented Axelrod with a National Medal of Science. On May 28, 2015, he was awarded an honorary doctorate by Harvard University.

== Bibliography ==
=== Books ===
- Axelrod, Robert (1970). Conflict of interest: a theory of divergent goals with applications to politics. Markham Pub. Co. ISBN 978-0-8410-3020-6.
- Axelrod, Robert (1976), Structure of Decision: The Cognitive Map of Political Elites, Princeton University Press, ISBN 978-0-691-10050-0
- Axelrod, Robert (1984), The Evolution of Cooperation, Basic Books, ISBN 978-0-465-02122-2
- Axelrod, Robert (1997), The Complexity of Cooperation: Agent-Based Models of Competition and Collaboration, Princeton University Press, ISBN 978-0-691-01567-5
- Axelrod, Robert (2006), The Evolution of Cooperation (Revised ed.), Perseus Books Group, ISBN 978-0-465-00564-2
- Axelrod, Robert; Cohen, Michael D. (2001-08-02). Harnessing Complexity. Basic Books. ISBN 978-0-465-00550-5.
- Axelrod, Robert (2023), Passion for Cooperation: Adventures of a Wide-Ranging Scientist, University of Michigan Press, ISBN 978-0-472-90394-8

=== Journal articles ===
- Axelrod, Robert; Hamilton, William D. (27 March 1981). "The evolution of cooperation". Science. 211 (4489): 1390–1396. Bibcode:1981Sci...211.1390A. doi:10.1126/science.7466396. PMID 7466396.
- Axelrod, Robert (April 1997). "The dissemination of culture: a model with local convergence and global polarization". Journal of Conflict Resolution. 41 (2): 203–226. doi:10.1177/0022002797041002001. hdl:2027.42/67489. S2CID 54639070.
- Axelrod, Robert; Atran, S, Davis, R (2007) Sacred Barriers to Conflict Resolution, Science (317)

== See also ==
- Cognitive map
- Evolutionarily stable strategy
- Prisoner's dilemma
