= Mathematics and artificial intelligence =

Mathematics and artificial intelligence (AI) have been interrelated since the initial development of AI. On one hand, mathematics plays a key role in artificial intelligence. For example, many AI algorithms use methods relying on optimization, statistics and linear algebra. On the other hand, researchers have for decades been trying to use AI and computers to help solve mathematics problems. The impact of AI has been pronounced in mathematics, where results are exactly verifiable.

== Background ==
=== Mathematics in AI ===
AI relies on mathematical techniques such as gradient descent

Many AI systems aim to approximate a set of data. This data, represented as numbers, is combined with weights using the techniques of linear algebra. The weighted data is typically non-linearized using for instance a sigmoid function, before defining a loss function to minimize. The loss function is then minimized using an optimization algorithm, for example gradient descent. This produces a set of weights which can be used to approximate the initial data.

=== AI in mathematics ===
In mathematics the goal is often to prove a statement or theorem. Large language models (LLMs) can assist mathematicians by writing proofs or helping find mistakes in written work. LLMs can also be used to disprove conjectures or proposed theorems by finding counterexamples. Mathematics is verifiable, because once a formal proof is written, it can be checked that every line of the proof follows from the assumptions or previous lines. Automation can be applied, by using a proof assistant such as Lean.

== History ==
After the introduction of the digital computer, computers made large numerical calculations useful in physics, engineering and military research. In 1956, a significant step was made when mathematicians built a program able to prove many of the theorems from Russell and Whitehead's Principia Mathematica. The Logic Theorist, as it became known, has been dubbed "the first artificial intelligence program".

During the 1960s, theoretical foundations for the field of artificial intelligence were laid. A decade later, computers began to be used in computer-assisted proofs.

In 2017, transformer architecture, a key component in modern LLMs, was developed using mathematics. In 2021, DeepMind's AI enabled researchers to identify patterns in mathematics which had remained elusive to humans. Google then launched AlphaGeometry in 2024, which was able to use artificial intelligence to solve advanced problems in Euclidean geometry.

Several frontier AI companies, notably OpenAI, train their upcoming models on advanced open research problems in mathematics. Following OpenAI's claim of a solution to the Navier-Stokes Millennium Prize problem, it partnered with the independent Advisory Group on Mathematics and Artificial Intelligence to "advise AI companies on their interactions with mathematical research and with the mathematical community, including the responsible presentation and release of mathematical results." The advisory group urged AI companies to stop testing their models on open mathematics problems.

== Present ==
Up until roughly 2024, large language models (LLMs) were poor at advanced mathematics. Since then, LLMs from major companies have made significant strides in mathematics, heralding an "AI Revolution in Math". Some of the most significant breakthroughs are summarized in the following table.

Selected Breakthroughs made with AI in mathematics
Date solved	Problem	Comments	Model
April 24, 2026	Erdös primitive sets #1196		Internal model, OpenAI
May 20, 2026	Erdös Unit distance conjecture	An internal model at OpenAI disproved Erdös' conjecture that $g(n) = O(n^{1+\epsilon}),$ where $g(n)$ is the number of pairs of points in a set of $n$ points which are a unit distance from each other.	Internal model, OpenAI
July 14, 2026	Cycle double cover	For any graph without bridges — edges whose removal would disconnect it — can you find a collection of cycles such that each edge is contained in exactly two of those cycles? 50 years open.	Internal model, OpenAI
July 20, 2026	Jacobian conjecture	Claude Fable 5 found a counterexample to the Jacobian conjecture for $n>2$. This conjecture had been open for more than 80 years. The result was published in a tweet on X.	Fable 5
August 1, 2026	Existence of non-sofic groups	OpenAI announced the construction of a non-sofic countable discrete group.	Internal version of Astra
September 8, 2026	Navier–Stokes existence and smoothness problem (unverified)	OpenAI announced an unbounded counterexample to the existence and smoothness of the Navier–Stokes equations. The claim has not currently been verified by external mathematicians.	Internal OpenAI frontier model
October 6, 2026	372 problems that OpenAI had tested its internal frontier model on, including a zero-free half-plane under the Riemann hypothesis (unverified)	OpenAI published 722 papers in a GitHub repository across a range of fields.	Internal OpenAI frontier model
November 20, 2026	Riemann hypothesis (unverified)	A researcher at Anthropic, Levent Alpöge, developed a proof of the Riemann hypothesis using Claude. Alpöge claims it generated a 250,000+ page informal proof, and a formal proof in Lean consisting of nearly 17.4 million lines of code. Only the formal proof has been released, which the Lean community considers verified.	Internal version of Claude

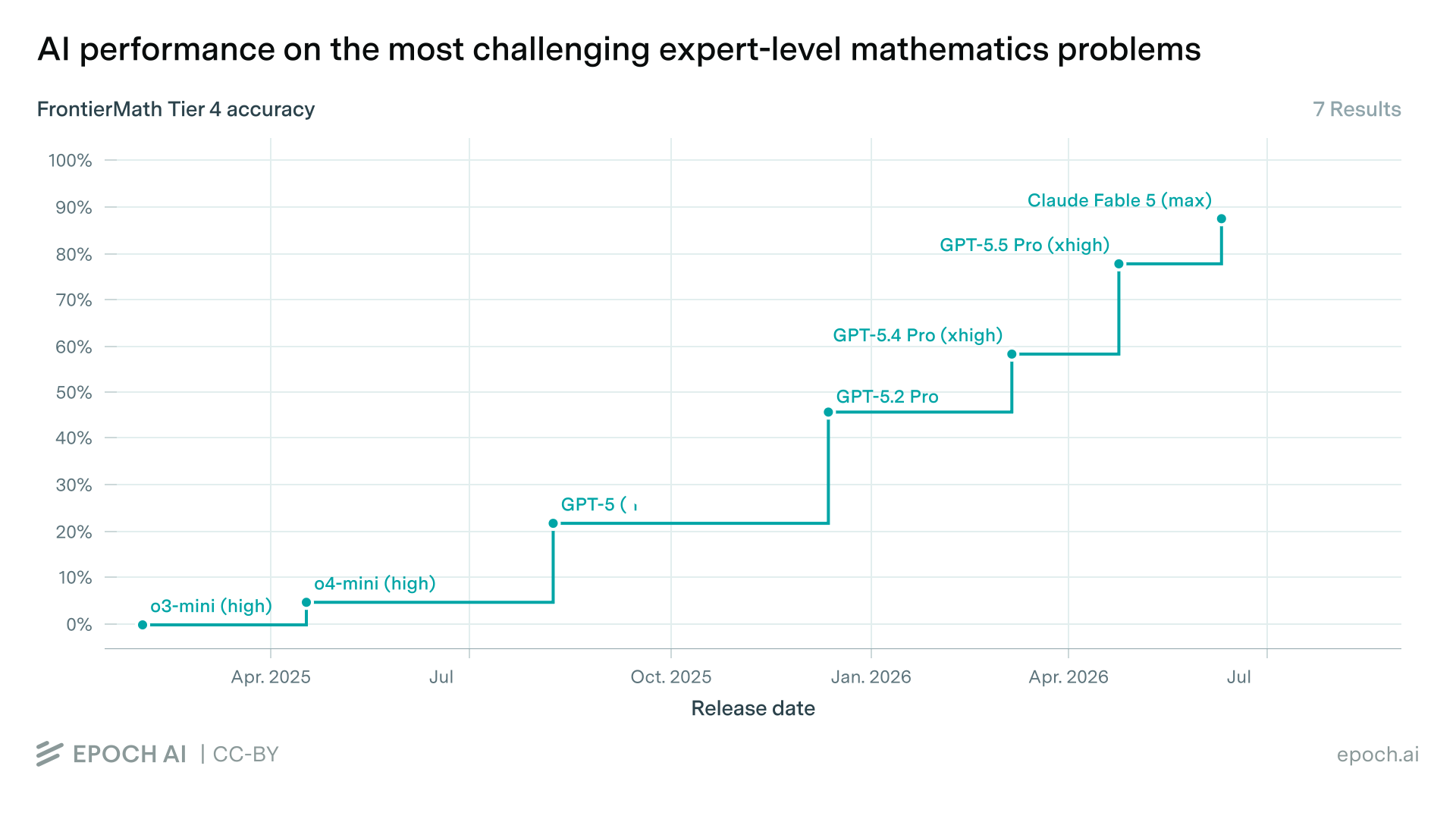
Peak LLM performance on FrontierMath AI benchmark

== Discussion ==
Concerns have been raised that the importance of the problems solved by AI in mathematics is overstated, and that the companies publishing these results are using the proofs as advertising for their models. There is also the question of attribution when AI makes a mathematical discovery. Furthermore, the prohibitive price of the best AI models can potentially restrict mathematical research to elite institutions. To address some of these issues, several mathematicians have signed the 2026 Leiden Declaration on Artificial Intelligence and Mathematics, calling on mathematicians, professional organizations, and policymakers to disclose the use of AI, uphold peer review, and protect the openness and values of the discipline.

Mathematician Terence Tao has argued that AI will change the way mathematics is done in the future. He has argued that AI will generate proofs that are verifiable by proof assistants yet indigestible to humans, and that the role of the mathematician will therefore have to involve greater emphasis on digesting and disseminating proofs.

== AI systems for mathematics ==
- AlphaDev
- AlphaEvolve
- AlphaGeometry
- AlphaProof
- AlphaTensor
- DeepSeek-Prover
- FunSearch
- Ramanujan machine

== See also ==
- Artificial intelligence
- Automated theorem proving
- Computer-assisted proof
- List of mathematical discoveries by artificial intelligence
- Numerical Analysis
- OpenAI bulk release of mathematical papers
- Proof assistant

== Sources ==
- Crevier, Daniel (1993). AI: The Tumultuous Search for Artificial Intelligence. New York, NY: BasicBooks. ISBN 0-465-02997-3.
- McCorduck, Pamela (2004), Machines Who Think (2nd ed.), Natick, Massachusetts: A. K. Peters, ISBN 1-5688-1205-1
- Russell, Stuart J.; Norvig, Peter. (2021). Artificial Intelligence: A Modern Approach (4th ed.). Hoboken New Jersey: Pearson. ISBN 9780134610993. LCCN 20190474.
