= AlphaTensor =

Artificial intelligence system for discovering matrix multiplication algorithms

- Developer: DeepMind
- Release: October 5, 2022
- Type: Artificial intelligence reinforcement learning algorithm discovery
- License: Apache License 2.0
- Website: AlphaTensor website
- Repository: github.com/google-deepmind/alphatensor

AlphaTensor is an artificial intelligence system developed by DeepMind for discovering efficient matrix multiplication algorithms using reinforcement learning. Introduced in 2022, the system was based on AlphaZero and formulated the search for matrix multiplication algorithms as a single-player game called TensorGame.

AlphaTensor was designed to search for new ways to multiply matrices with fewer scalar multiplication operations. Matrix multiplication is a fundamental operation in linear algebra, numerical analysis, scientific computing, computer graphics, and machine learning. The system discovered thousands of matrix multiplication algorithms, including algorithms that rediscovered known human-designed methods and others that improved on previously known results for particular matrix sizes and mathematical settings.

== Background ==
Matrix multiplication is one of the basic operations in numerical computing. The standard algorithm for multiplying two square matrices has cubic time complexity, while faster algorithms such as the Strassen algorithm reduce the number of multiplication operations by using more complex algebraic decompositions. Finding optimal matrix multiplication algorithms can be difficult because it involves searching through a large space of possible tensor decompositions.

AlphaTensor approached this problem by representing algorithm discovery as TensorGame, in which each move corresponds to an operation that reduces a tensor representing matrix multiplication. The goal of the game is to find a low-rank decomposition of the matrix multiplication tensor, corresponding to an efficient multiplication algorithm.

== Development ==
AlphaTensor was developed by DeepMind and described in a paper published in Nature in October 2022. The system built on the reinforcement-learning approach used in AlphaZero, which had previously been applied to games such as Go, chess, and shogi. Unlike those games, TensorGame involved a very large search space, requiring changes to the AlphaZero-style search method and neural network architecture.

DeepMind released source code and discovered algorithms associated with the publication through a public GitHub repository.

== Results ==
AlphaTensor discovered matrix multiplication algorithms over both standard arithmetic and finite fields. One widely reported result was a method for multiplying 4 × 4 matrices over the field with two elements using 47 multiplication operations, improving on the 49 operations required by applying Strassen's algorithm recursively in that setting.

The system also found algorithms optimized for particular computer hardware, including algorithms designed for graphics processing units and Tensor Processing Units. DeepMind stated that some of the hardware-specific algorithms improved practical execution time compared with commonly used algorithms on the tested hardware.

== Significance ==
AlphaTensor was described as an example of using machine learning not only to apply existing algorithms, but to assist in discovering new ones. The work was connected to broader research in algorithm discovery, automated machine learning, program synthesis, and computational complexity theory, especially the open problem of determining the optimal complexity of matrix multiplication.

AlphaTensor later became part of a broader group of Google DeepMind systems for algorithm and mathematical discovery, alongside systems such as AlphaDev and AlphaEvolve.

== See also ==
- AlphaDev
- AlphaEvolve
- AlphaGeometry
- AlphaProof
- Algorithm
- Automated machine learning
- Computational complexity of matrix multiplication
- FunSearch
- List of artificial intelligence algorithms
- List of mathematical discoveries by artificial intelligence
- Matrix multiplication algorithm
- Program synthesis
- Reinforcement learning
- Strassen algorithm
