= Platform 37 =

Google building in London

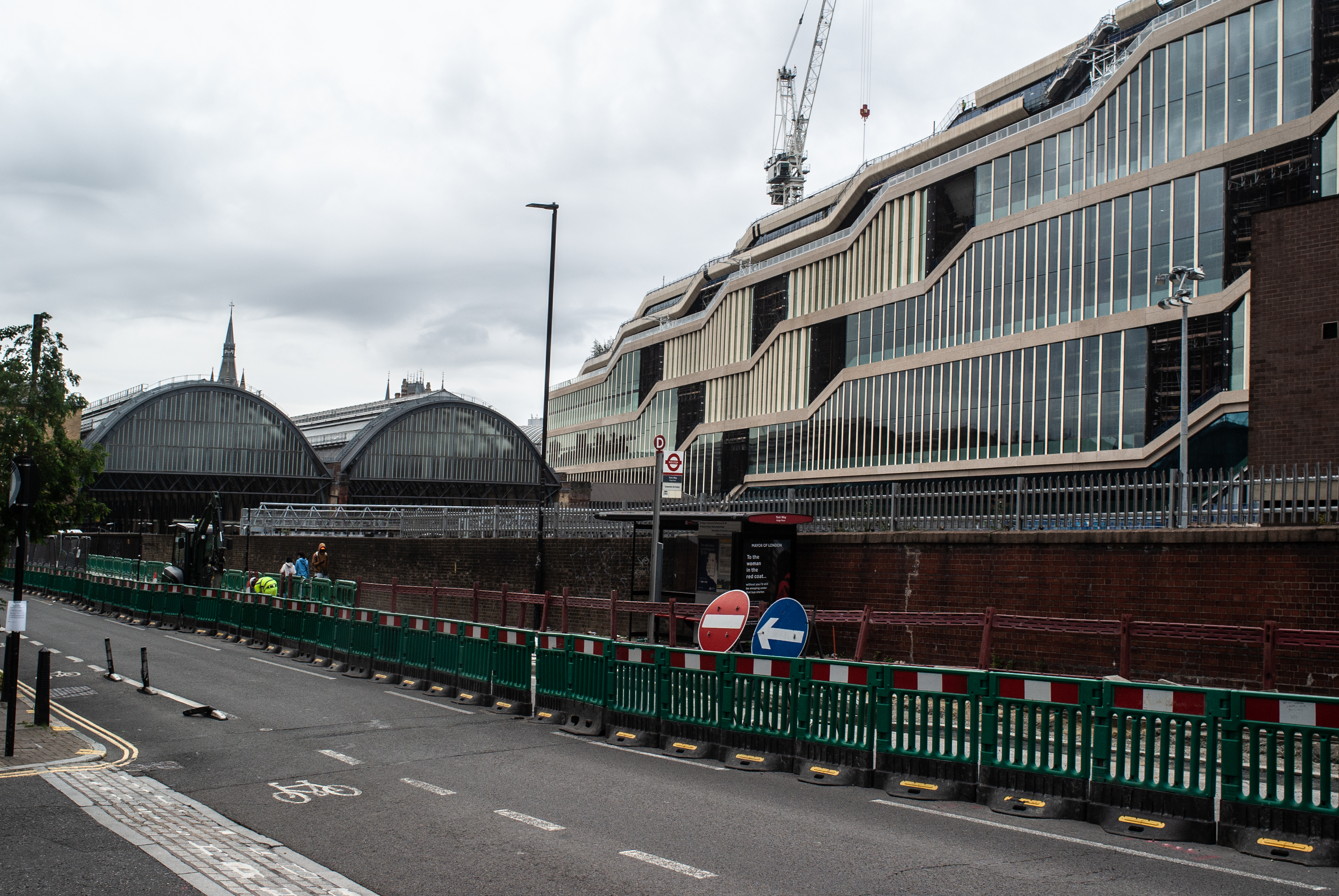

General information
- Location: 6 King's Blvd, Kings Cross, London N1C, UK, London, United Kingdom
- Coordinates: 51.5337°N 0.1241°W
- Construction started: 2018
- Owner: Google UK

Technical details
- Floor count: 11

Design and construction
- Architects: Thomas Heatherwick, Bjarke Ingels
- Structural engineer: AKT II
- Main contractor: Bovis

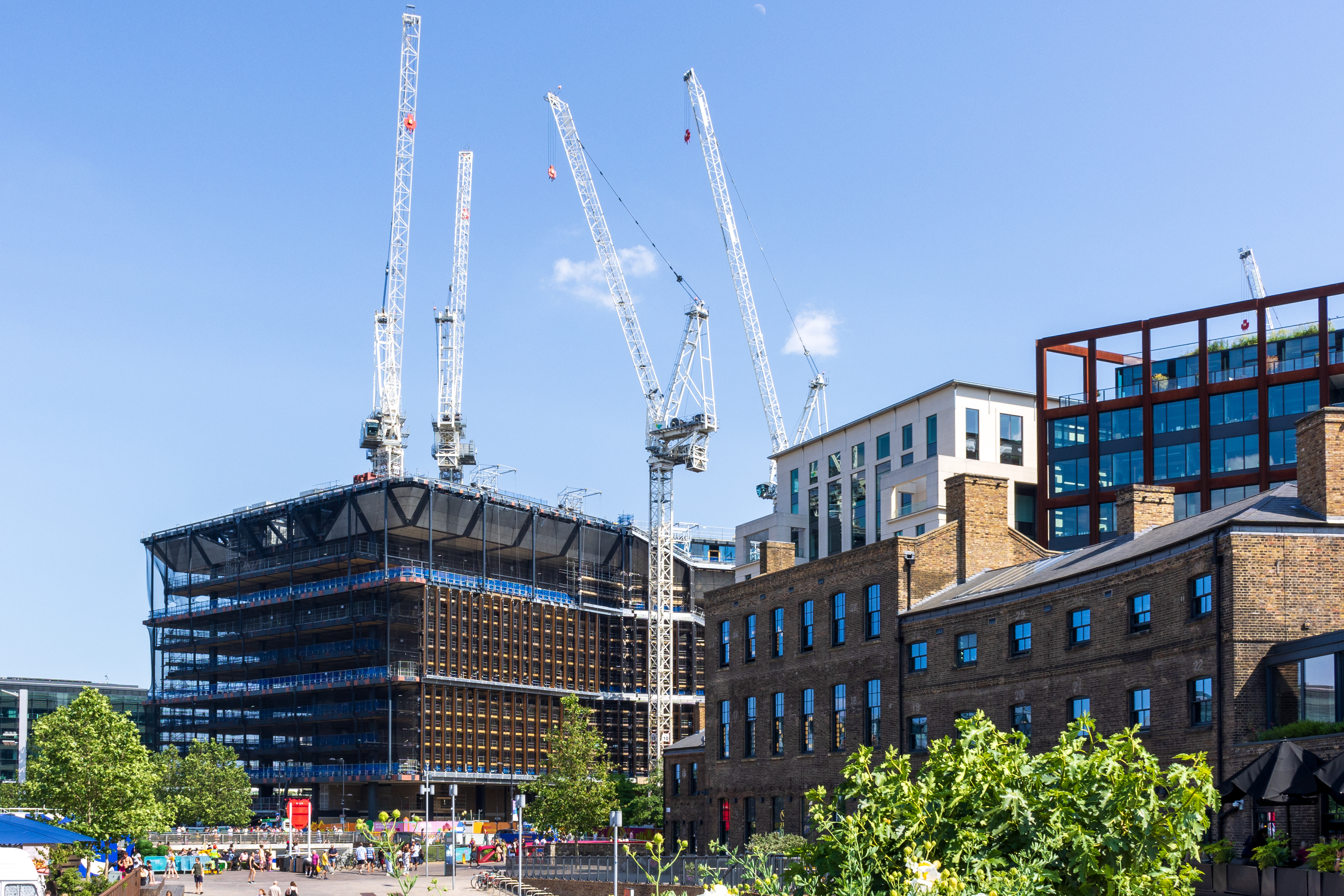
Google headquarters (left) in King's Cross under construction in 2023

Platform 37 is Google's new building in King's Cross, London, forming part of the Knowledge Quarter in King's Cross Central. It will be the headquarters of Google in the United Kingdom. It is the first building wholly owned and designed by Google outside the United States. Platform 37 features "terraced gardens on the roof."

Its proportions of 72 metres (236 ft) in height at its highest point and 330 metres (1,080 ft) in length have led to it being dubbed a 'landscraper'. It consists of 11 stories, providing a total of 861,100sq ft of office space upon completion, making it the 8th largest building in Europe by office space. Google will occupy 60,000 of the more than 80,000 square meters, with retail planned underneath. It is designed to home 4,000 staff and will form part of a larger campus alongside Google's existing office nearby in Pancras Square.

The property was purchased in 2013. Google submitted a planning application to Camden Council in 2017 after scrapping initial plans with AHMM. In March 2026, Google announced that the building would open later in the year under the name "Platform 37" . The name is in reference to the 37th move in the 2016 Go match in which grandmaster Lee Sedol was defeated by the AI program AlphaGo, whose designers Google DeepMind will be among the teams to move into the building.
