= M. bovis =

M. bovis may refer to:

- Moraxella bovis, the pink eye, a Gram-negative, aerobic, oxidase-positive diplococcus bacterium species implicated in infectious keratoconjunctivitis in cattle
- Mycobacterium bovis, a slow-growing, aerobic bacterium species causative of tuberculosis in cattle
- Mycoplasma bovis, a bacterium associated with bovine respiratory disease

== See also ==
- Bovis (disambiguation)
