= Leiden Declaration on Artificial Intelligence and Mathematics =

2026 declaration by mathematicians

- Created: 2 June 2026
- Media type: Public statement
- Subject: Artificial intelligence in mathematics research

Official website
- leidendeclaration.ai

The Leiden Declaration on Artificial Intelligence and Mathematics is a statement published in June 2026 by an international group of mathematicians in response to rapid progress by artificial intelligence (AI) in producing research-level mathematics. It originated at a September 2025 workshop at the Lorentz Center at Leiden University and is endorsed by the International Mathematical Union.

The declaration warns that reliance on AI-generated proofs threatens the accuracy, reliability and independent verifiability of mathematical research, and that the growing involvement of AI companies risks skewing research priorities toward problems amenable to AI methods while disadvantaging researchers without access to them. It calls on mathematicians, professional organizations and policymakers to disclose the use of AI, uphold peer review, and protect the openness and values of the discipline.

== Background ==
Several companies are working on AI-assisted mathematical discovery. These include major labs such as OpenAI, Google DeepMind and Anthropic, as well as smaller start ups including Harmonic, Math Inc. and Axiom Math.

The origin of the declaration is a workshop in September 2025 at the Lorentz Center at Leiden University. Sixty researchers and policymakers gathered to consider the effect of technology on mathematics, given the increase in proofs being written in part or whole by AI.

In May 2026, OpenAI announced a refutation constructed by a generative AI model of the unit distance problem, an 80-year-old conjecture by Paul Erdős in combinatorial geometry. Some mathematicians were amazed and impressed by the automation; some expressed concern. Melanie Matchett Wood was enthusiastic while noting that OpenAI had not appropriately cited "a history of closely related ideas in the literature." Ursula Martin described the result as "remarkable" and "impressive". She said: "We are not told about the model's failures. If you put vast quantities of human effort into this problem, you likely would've solved it in the same way. But in math human effort is scarce, and just tends to be spent on different things." Rodrigo Ochigame said that information needed to assess the result—"the methods, human-written prompts, training data, or computational resources consumed"—had not been revealed.

== Content ==
The declaration was written by 16 mathematicians, including Jim Portegies (Eindhoven), who led the project, Mateja Jamnik (Cambridge), Ursula Martin (Oxford), Rodrigo Ochigame (Leiden), and Michael Harris (Columbia).

The declaration expresses concerns about risks to the accuracy and reliability of mathematical papers raised by reliance on AI-generated proofs. It says: "Technology companies' involvement in research raises the risk that research questions are prioritized and incentivized because of their amenability to AI methods and models, rather than their deeper significance to understanding." Researchers without access to AI methods are put at a disadvantage.

The declaration says that "models trained on published works frequently return outputs that do not properly cite the human works they synthesize" and that these models' training data has been gathered by "exploiting licenses and access arrangements" or "simply violating copyright protections."

Corporate press releases about mathematical discoveries by AI are described as being on "market timelines before the accepted processes of community evaluation in mathematics can take place."

The declaration recommends disclosing the use of AI in research papers, ensuring that AI-assisted papers are peer-reviewed, and providing legal resources and public funding so that academia and for-profit companies can compete on equal terms.

Contributors describe the purpose of the declaration as to stimulate debate and help mathematicians articulate the values of their profession. Michael Harris said: "The purpose, from my perspective, is to recover control of the narrative about the values and the goals of mathematics from the A.I. industry." He describes mathematicians' values as being "openness, honesty, giving credit where credit is due, sharing, transparency about methodologies, and access for independent verification of results." Writing in the Communications of the ACM, co-author Mateja Jamnik described the declaration as a call on the "mathematical community to make its values explicit at a time when AI systems are increasingly becoming part of mathematical research".

== Reception ==
Mateja Jamnik said that over 1000 people signed the online declaration in the first day of its release.

The declaration is endorsed by the International Mathematical Union, and by academics Kevin Buzzard (Imperial), Leslie Ann Goldberg (Oxford), Peter Scholze (Max Planck), and Ulrike Tillmann (IMU vice president).

Jim Portegies will present the declaration at the International Congress of Mathematicians, July 2026.

An editorial in Nature endorsed the way the declaration was created and its conclusions.

== See also ==
- List of mathematical discoveries by artificial intelligence
- Mathematics and artificial intelligence
- Navier-Stokes priority controversy
