= List of mathematical discoveries made with artificial intelligence =

Beginning in the mid-2020s, large language models, including reasoning models, have made increasing progress in generating mathematical proofs at research level.

== 2021 ==
- In February 2021, researchers at the Technion – Israel Institute of Technology published results from the Ramanujan machine, an algorithmic system designed to discover mathematical conjectures. The system generated previously unknown continued fraction representations involving mathematical constants such as π, e, Catalan's constant, and values of the Riemann zeta function. Some of the conjectured identities were proved, while others remained unproven. Unlike an automated theorem prover, the system generated conjectures without independently establishing their validity.
- In December 2021, researchers at Google DeepMind collaborated with mathematicians to apply machine learning to problems in knot theory and representation theory. The research led to the discovery and proof of a new relationship between the algebraic and geometric properties of mathematical knots. It also produced a new formula for computing Kazhdan–Lusztig polynomials, suggesting a possible approach to resolving the combinatorial invariance conjecture for symmetric groups.

== 2022 ==
- In October 2022, researchers at DeepMind introduced AlphaTensor, a reinforcement learning system that discovered more efficient matrix multiplication algorithms. For 4 × 4 matrices over the finite field with two elements, AlphaTensor found an algorithm requiring 47 scalar multiplications, compared with 49 using two applications of Strassen's algorithm. The system also discovered improved algorithms for other matrix sizes, including algorithms using ordinary arithmetic.

== 2023 ==
- In December 2023, researchers at Google DeepMind used a pre-trained LLM to discover a new lower bound for the cap set problem and new algorithms for the bin packing problem. The results for the cap set problem were verified by mathematician Jordan Ellenberg.

== 2024 ==
- In October 2024, researchers at Meta and the Ecole des Ponts et Chaussees found pre-trained Seq2seq transformers could discover new global Lyapunov functions at a higher rate than non-AI systems.

== 2025 ==
- In May 2025, Google DeepMind's AlphaEvolve agent discovered an optimization for the Strassen algorithm, reducing the scalar multiplications needed for 4x4 matrices from 49 to 48. It also improved the lower bounds for 11 kissing numbers.
- In September 2025, Math Inc.'s Gauss agent formalized the strong prime number theorem in Lean, producing approximately 25,000 lines of code and formally proving more than 1,000 theorems.
- In November 2025, researchers at Chinese universities constructed a reinforcement learning algorithm which improved the lower and upper bounds for 15 kissing numbers.

== 2026 ==
=== Q1 ===
- In February 2026, Google DeepMind used its Gemini model to survey the 700 open Erdős problems, which proved four of them and found nine published solutions that had not previously been widely recognized.
- In March 2026, Math Inc.'s Gauss agent formalized Maryna Viazovska's proofs of sphere packing in 8 and 24 dimensions, in approximately 200 thousand lines of Lean code.
- In March 2026, Google DeepMind's AlphaEvolve agent improved lower bounds for nine classical Ramsey numbers.

=== Q2 ===
- In May 2026, Google DeepMind used an AlphaEvolve-like model, adapted for mathematical proofs, to prove nine Erdős problems and 44 out of 492 formalized OEIS conjectures. Epoch AI then used various LLMs to prove or disprove 147 of these 492 OEIS conjectures.
- In May 2026, OpenAI announced that an internal model had produced a disproof of the unit distance problem, and several mathematicians collaborated to produce a verification and exposition of the result.
- In May 2026, Max Grinzstajn prompted GPT-5.5 Pro to discover a counterexample for Borsuk's conjecture in dimension n = 63, the smallest dimension for which a counterexample is known.

=== Q3 ===
Time period	AI provenance	Area of mathematics	Topic	Subject(s) responsible	Formal status	Source
July 2026	GPT-5.6 Sol Ultra	graph theory	proof of the cycle double cover conjecture	OpenAI	Sang-il Oum and Jim Geelen published independent expositions of the argument.	OpenAI published an article which proved the conjecture which states that every bridgeless graph has a collection of cycles covering every edge exactly twice.
July 2026	Claude Fable 5	algebraic geometry	explicit counterexample to the Jacobian conjecture, in dimension 3	Levent Alpöge and Akhil Mathew	Verified by several independent mathematicians.	On 20 July, Alpöge posted on X an explicit counterexample to the Jacobian conjecture and a link to WolframAlpha which verified the counterexample.
July 2026	GPT-5.6 Pro	combinatorial optimisation	counterexample to the Dinitz–Garg–Goemans conjecture	Dmitry Rybin	Counterexample published.	On 22 July, Rybin presented on X a counterexample in which a fractional flow of 58 exists, yet every unsplittable flow that meets the capacity bound costs at least 60. The disproof establishes that the theorem's capacity guarantee and a matching cost guarantee cannot always be achieved simultaneously by a single flow.
July 2026	GPT-5.6 Sol	matrix analysis	proof of Crouzeix's conjecture	Shanmu Jin	Anne Greenbaum, Alex Townsend and Michel Crouzeix reviewed the proof and considered it to be correct. An independent proof by Emiel Lorist and Felix Schwenninger, also developed with AI assistance, was published a week later.	On 27 July, Jin posted a preprint proof of Crouzeix's conjecture. Three days later, Alex Townsend found the preprint using GPT 5.6 and checked the proof.
August 2026	unreleased version of GPT-6 Astra	group theory	construction establishing the existence of non-sofic groups	OpenAI	Lean formalization	On 1 August, OpenAI posted a proof that the unit group $L_{\mathbb{F}_2}(1,2)^{\times}$of the binary Leavitt path algebra is non-sofic.
August 2026	unreleased version of GPT-6 Astra	geometry	partial proof of Ehrhart's volume conjecture	OpenAI	Lean formalization	On 1 August, OpenAI posted a proof establishing the upper bound to Ehrhart's volume conjecture, that $\displaystyle \operatorname {Vol} (K)\leq {(n+1)^{n}/{n!}}$. The equality case is still open.
August 2026	unreleased version of GPT-6 Astra	complexity theory	proof of the NP-hardness of the closest vector problem	OpenAI	Lean formalization	On 1 August, OpenAI posted a proof that approximating the Euclidean closest vector problem in dimension $n$ within a factor of $n^{1/400}$ is NP-hard.
August 2026	OpenAI GPT-5.6 Pro	complex analysis	proof of Sendov's conjecture for all degrees n ≥ 2	Lech Mazur	Lean formalization	On 3 August, Mazur posted a proof of Sendov's conjecture for all degrees $n\ge2$. Terence Tao examined and streamlined the argument, produced a separate and shorter Lean formalization, and noted the proof also established the stronger Phelps–Rodriguez conjecture.
August 2026	unreleased research version of Claude	analytic number theory	proven share of Riemann zeta function zeros on the critical line increased from 41.6% to 67.25%	Jarred Sumner and Anthropic	Youness Lamzouri reviewed the proof, considered it correct, and proposed a simplified proof of the result.	On 10 August, Anthropic announced that it had made progress on increasing the bound for the fraction of zeroes of the Riemann zeta function from 41.6% to 67.25%.
August 2026	unreleased version of Claude	combinatorics	Hadamard matrices constructed for the twelve orders below 2000 for which none were previously known	Levent Alpöge, Philippe Voinov and Saul Reynolds-Haertle	Computer-verified constructions	On 12 August, Alpöge posted constructions for Hadamard matrices for twelve unresolved orders: 668, 716, 892, 1132, 1244, 1388, 1436, 1676, 1772, 1916, 1948 and 1964. The smallest of those, 668, had been the smallest open case of the Hadamard conjecture since 2005. The conjecture itself, which concerns all orders divisible by four, remains open.
August 2026	unreleased version of Claude	Diophantine geometry	two elliptic curves with the largest known rank (at least 30 and 31, respectively)	Levent Alpöge and Ava Howell	The elliptic curves have the 30 and 31 independent basis points with infinite order listed.	On 20 August, an elliptic curve of rank at least 30 was posted to the Elliptic Curve Rank Leaderboard, with the solution credited to Alpöge and Howell. On 23 August, an elliptic curve of rank at least 31 was posted. These curves broke the previous known record of rank at least 29.
August 2026	Claude	complex manifolds	the 6-sphere admits a complex structure	Levent Alpöge	the proof has not yet been independently verified	If confirmed, this would resolve the old Hopf problem.
August 2026	GPT-5.6 Sol	prime numbers	an improvement on the Erdős–Rankin conjecture (Erdős Problem 4).	DottedCalculator (pseudonym) claiming authorship of a paper uploaded to Github	Lean formalization	According to the paper, there are infinitely many gaps $g_n = p_{n+1} - p_n$ between primes such that $g_n > \frac{c\ \log n\ \log\log n}{\log\log\log\log n}$ for some constant $c>0$. This improves on the original proof of the conjecture by Ford, Green, Konyagin, Maynard and Tao from 2014. According to Green, the new result uses a new but relatively elementary approach that would have been strong enough to independently solve the original problem without their 2014 paper, but which could have been discovered in the 1960s.
August 2026	OpenAI	prime numbers	progress on prime gaps	OpenAI	result has not yet been independently verified	Proposed a proof showing that there are infinitely many prime numbers that are at most 186 apart, an improvement on the previous bound of 246 that was established in 2014 by the Polymath Project. The OpenAI r.
September 2026	Anthropic	percolation theory	proof of the dying percolation conjecture	Ahmed Bou-Rabee	Lean formalization	The result was obtained by proving an equivalent conjecture by Gady Kozma and Shaha Nitzan. Building on the result, Ahmed Bou-Rabee from the University of Pennsylvania proposed a proof of the remaining Kozma-Nitzan conjectures, which he found the following day with ChatGPT Sol 5.6 Ultra and formalized in Lean with Claude Fable 5.1.
September 2026	Anthropic, Claude	number theory	complete computer-checked proof of Fermat's Last Theorem	Peng Tianyi	Lean formalization	Written over 11 days. It formalizes a simplified version of the original proof found by Andrew Wiles in 1994. Work on formalizing the theorem had started early in the century. The proof in Lean is 13 million lines long, the largest Lean proof written to date, and 29,500 theorems were formally proved for this task.
September 2026	Epoch AI, GPT-6 Astra	ring theory	disproof of the Köthe conjecture	Tom Adamczewski, Bernhard Böhmler, Rene Marczinzik	Lean formalization	An exposition of the proof was posted by ring theorists Bernhard Böhmler and Rene Marczinzik.
September 2026	Epoch AI, GPT-6 Astra	probability theory	disproof of the Ibragimov–Iosifescu conjecture for φ-mixing sequences	Tom Adamczewski	Lean formalization; independent review pending	GitHub repository
September 2026	Epoch AI, GPT-6 Astra	graph theory	counterexample to an eternal domination conjecture	William Klostermeyer	?	
September 2026	Epoch AI, GPT-6 Astra	combinatorics	proof of the Dittert conjecture	Tom Adamczewski	Lean formalization	
September 2026	Epoch AI, GPT-6 Astra	number theory	counterexample to the n = 4 case of the N conjecture	Tom Adamczewski	Lean formalization	the only remaining open case

==== Navier–Stokes equations ====
In September 2026, OpenAI said that an internal model more powerful than GPT-6 Astra had solved the Navier–Stokes existence and smoothness problem, one of the Millennium Prize Problems. The proposed solution has not been verified by the wider mathematical community. Priority for the discovery is disputed.

=== Q4 ===
Time period	AI provenance	Area of mathematics	Topic	People	Formal status	Source
October 2026	unreleased research version of Claude	complexity theory	proof of algorithms for subquadratic 3SUM and subcubic all-pairs shortest path problem	Anthropic, Josh Alman and Virginia Vassilevska Williams	Lean formalization	On 5 October, Josh Alman and Virginia Vassilevska Williams published a preprint on ArXiv with a deterministic algorithm that solves the 3SUM problem for integers of polynomial size in $O(n^{1.9992})$ time and a deterministic algorithm that solves the all pairs shortest path problem for polynomial bounded integer weight in $O(n^{2.9995})$ time. The authors stated that Anthropic's internal research model discovered the result, formalized it in Lean and shared it with them to assist them with writing the paper.
November 2026	Anthropic, Claude	number theory	proof of the generalized Riemann hypothesis	Levent Alpöge	Lean formalization	On November 21, Anthropic researcher Levent Alpöge announced a proof of the generalized Riemann hypothesis (including the Riemann hypothesis as a special case) developed with Claude. Alpöge claims it generated a 250,000+ page informal proof, and a formal proof in Lean consisting of nearly 17.4 million lines of code. Only the formal proof has been released, which the Lean community considers verified.

Proofs across 722 papers over a wide range of 377 mathematical topics were self-published in the OpenAI bulk release of mathematical papers. The proofs were generated using an unreleased model. Approximately 42% of the papers were accompanied by a Lean formalization. Three papers were retracted by OpenAI after peer review within three days of publication, and other papers have been criticized for making stronger claims about the problems than were formalized in Lean, or being too mathematically vague or poorly written to prove a statement.

In October 2026, American artificial intelligence companies OpenAI and Anthropic announced disproofs of the exponential time hypothesis ETH found by internal LLMs, exhibiting explicit algorithms claimed to run in subexponential time. A team of experts, including those who formulated ETH, announced a collaboration to examine this work.

== See also ==
- Automated theorem proving
- Computer-assisted proof
- Leiden Declaration on Artificial Intelligence and Mathematics
- Mathematics and artificial intelligence
