= Search space =

Search space may refer to one of the following:

- In mathematical optimization and computer science, the set of all possible points of an optimization problem that satisfy the problem's targets or goals. It may also refer to the optimization of the domain of the function.
- In artificial intelligence search algorithms, the feasible region defining the set of all possible solutions
- In computational geometry, part of the input data in geometric search problems
- Version space, developed via machine learning, is the subset of all hypotheses that are consistent with the observed training examples

== See also ==
- Space (disambiguation)
