= Decentralized partially observable Markov decision process =

Model for coordination and decision-making among multiple agents

The decentralized partially observable Markov decision process (Dec-POMDP) is a model for coordination and decision-making among multiple agents. It is a probabilistic model that can consider uncertainty in outcomes, sensors and communication (i.e., costly, delayed, noisy or nonexistent communication).

It is a generalization of a Markov decision process (MDP) and a partially observable Markov decision process (POMDP) to consider multiple decentralized agents.

== Definition ==
=== Formal definition ===
A Dec-POMDP is a 7-tuple $(S,\{A_i\},T,R,\{\Omega_i\},O,\gamma)$, where

- $S$ is a set of states,
- $A_i$ is a set of actions for agent $i$, with $A=\times_i A_i$ is the set of joint actions,
- $T$ is a set of conditional transition probabilities between states, $T(s,a,s')=P(s'\mid s,a)$,
- $R: S \times A \to \mathbb{R}$ is the reward function.
- $\Omega_i$ is a set of observations for agent $i$, with $\Omega=\times_i \Omega_i$ is the set of joint observations,
- $O$ is a set of conditional observation probabilities $O(s',a, o)=P(o\mid s',a)$, and
- $\gamma \in [0, 1]$ is the discount factor.

At each time step, each agent takes an action $a_i \in A_i$, the state updates based on the transition function $T(s,a,s')$ (using the current state and the joint action), each agent observes an observation based on the observation function $O(s',a, o)$ (using the next state and the joint action) and a reward is generated for the whole team based on the reward function $R(s,a)$. The goal is to maximize expected cumulative reward over a finite or infinite number of steps. These time steps repeat until some given horizon (called finite horizon) or forever (called infinite horizon). The discount factor $\gamma$ maintains a finite sum in the infinite-horizon case ($\gamma \in [0,1)$).
