= Ramanujan machine =

Software that produces mathematical conjectures about continued fractions

The Ramanujan machine is a software package, developed by a team of scientists at the Technion – Israel Institute of Technology around 2019 to 2021, to discover new formulas in mathematics. It is named after the Indian mathematician Srinivasa Ramanujan by analogy with his discovery of hundreds of formulas, often without proof.

The machine has produced several conjectures in the form of continued fraction expansions of expressions involving some of the most important constants in mathematics like e and π (pi). Some of these conjectures produced by the Ramanujan machine have subsequently been proved true. The others continue to remain as conjectures. The software was conceptualised and developed by a group of Technion undergraduates under the guidance of Ido Kaminer, an electrical engineering faculty member. The details of the machine were published online on 3 February 2021 in the journal Nature.

According to George Andrews, an expert on the mathematics of Ramanujan, even though some of the results produced by the Ramanujan machine are amazing and difficult to prove, the results produced by the machine are not of the caliber of Ramanujan and so calling the software the Ramanujan machine may be "over the top". Israeli mathematician Doron Zeilberger has opined that the Ramanujan machine is a harbinger of a new methodology of doing mathematics.

== Formulas discovered by the Ramanujan machine ==
The following are some of the formulas discovered by the Ramanujan machine which have been later proved to be true:

$$\cfrac{4}{3\pi -8} =  3 - \cfrac{1\cdot 1}{6 -  \cfrac{2\cdot 3}{9 -  \cfrac{3\cdot 5}{12 - \cfrac{4\cdot 7}{15 - {_\ddots}}}}}$$

$$\cfrac{e}{e - 2} =  4 - \cfrac{1}{5 -  \cfrac{1}{6 -  \cfrac{2}{7 - \cfrac{3}{8 - {_\ddots}}}}}$$
$$\cfrac{8}{\pi^2} =  1 - \cfrac{2\cdot 1^4 - 3\cdot 1^3}{7 -  \cfrac{2\cdot 2^4 - 3\cdot 2^3}{19 -  \cfrac{2\cdot 3^4 - 3\cdot 3^3}{37 - \cfrac{2\cdot 4^4 - 3\cdot 4^3}{61 - {_\ddots}}}}}$$
$$\begin{aligned} \frac{24}{\pi ^2} = 2+\frac{8 \cdot 1^4}{ 2 + 7 \cdot 1 \cdot 2 + \frac{8 \cdot 2^4}{ 2+ 7 \cdot 2 \cdot 3 + \frac{8 \cdot 3^4}{ 2+ 7 \cdot 3 \cdot 4 + \frac{8 \cdot 4^4}{\ddots }}}}\,\end{aligned}$$

The following are some of the many formulas conjectured by the Ramanujan machine whose truth or falsity has not yet been established:

$$\cfrac{1}{1 - \log 2} =  4 - \cfrac{8}{14 -  \cfrac{72}{30 -  \cfrac{288}{52 - \cfrac{800}{80 - {_\ddots}}}}}$$

In the last expression, the numbers 4, 14, 30, 52, . . . are defined by the sequence $a_n=3n^2+7n+4$ for $n=0,1,2,3, \ldots$ and the numbers 8, 72, 288, 800, . . . are generated using the formula $b_n= 2n^2(n+1)^2$ for $n=1,2,3 \ldots$.
