= Bovis =

Bovis may refer to:

- Bovis Homes Group, a national British housebuilding company, now known as Vistry Group
- Bovis Lend Lease, an international construction management company and former subsidiary of Lendlease (1999-2011)
- Bovis (company), UK construction company, acquired from Lendlease by Atlas Holdings in 2025

== Biology ==
- Sarcoptes scabiei var. bovis, a mite subspecies

== Other ==
- Calculus bovis, niu-huang or ox bezoars, dried gallstones of cattle used in Chinese herbology where they are said to remove toxins from the body
- Julian Bovis, a British journalist and award-winning art director
- Ted Bovis, fictional character in the sitcom Hi-de-Hi!
