= OpenAI bulk release of mathematical papers =

2026 release of AI-generated mathematical solutions

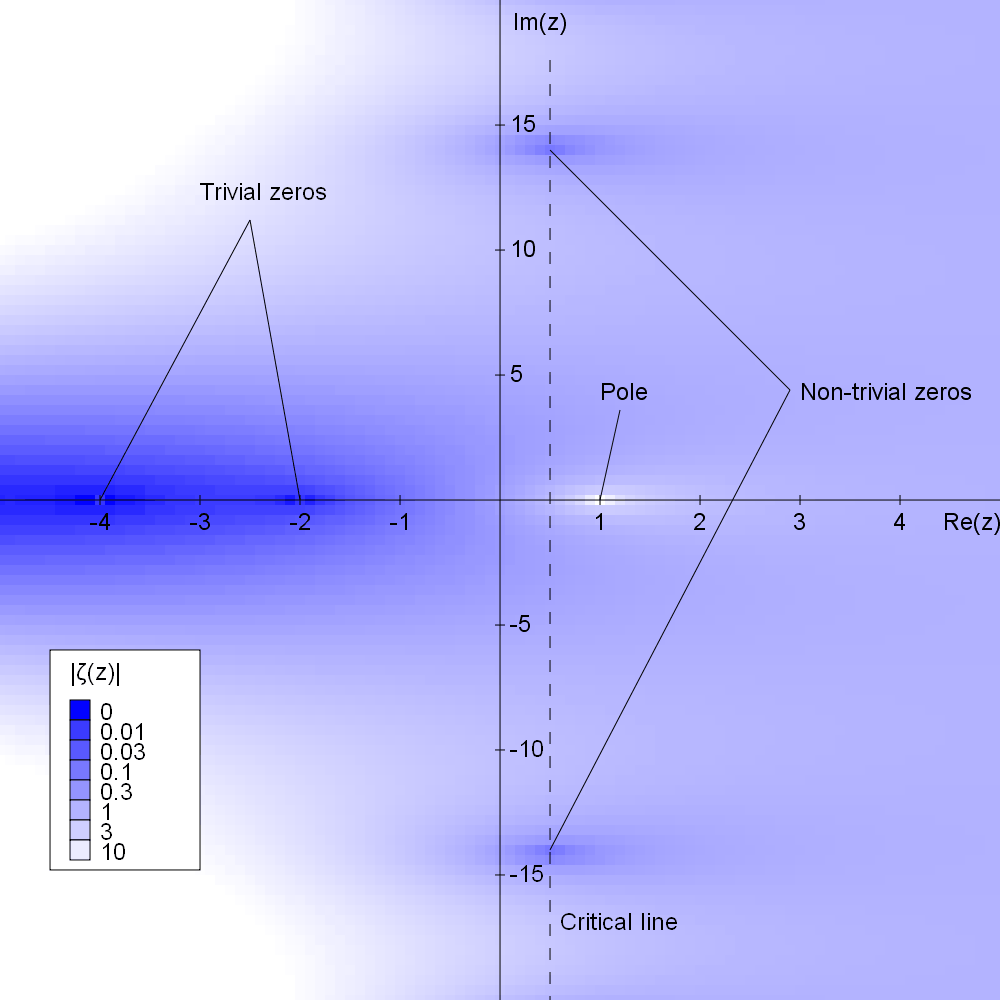
Plot of the Riemann zeta function's absolute value across the complex plane. OpenAI's results included the "quasi-Riemann hypothesis", claiming a zero-free region $\operatorname{Re}(s)>\tfrac{7}{8}$.

On 6 October 2026, American artificial intelligence company OpenAI released 722 manuscripts claiming to have solved a large number of open and unsolved major mathematical problems, via a GitHub repository. These included partial results on the Riemann hypothesis, Birch and Swinnerton-Dyer conjecture, and Hodge conjecture. In response, mathematicians raised concerns about the manuscripts' validity and exposition style, and about whether releasing them advanced human understanding. The event has been dubbed the mathocalypse.

The release was preceded by the Navier–Stokes priority controversy, in which the company's claim to solving the Navier–Stokes existence and smoothness problem under certain conditions was criticized for taking credit for human researchers' work.

Many months may be required for academics to fully assess the impacts of the event and quality of the breakthroughs.

== Background ==
=== Navier–Stokes ===
On 8 September 2026, OpenAI claimed a solution to the Navier–Stokes existence and smoothness problem with a smooth external force. However, approximately 12 hours before OpenAI's announcement, mathematician Tristan Buckmaster claimed that his and Levent Alpöge's recent advances on Euler equations were leaked to OpenAI a few days earlier and may have inspired OpenAI's prompts for the agents in the process that led to the solution. OpenAI stated they began large-scale work on all Millennium Prize Problems on 1 September, following rumors that Anthropic had solved two such problems. In response, a declaration was published on 11 September and signed by 28 Fields Medalists, titled A Severe Misalignment of AI in Mathematics, warned against "detrimental" impact on mathematics from AI companies treating unsolved problems as benchmarks without enhancing human understanding.

=== Expectation ===
The new results had been expected for weeks. In August 2026, OpenAI convened about forty mathematicians to discuss AI advances in mathematics, hinting that its models had solved hundreds of conjectures. In a blog post on September 21, they claimed an internal frontier model that had been trained since August 28 resolved more than 100 long-standing open problems in mathematics, in addition to Navier-Stokes. They announced they were working with an independent new advisory board of mathematicians to publish research with best practices. The advisory group consisted of nine mathematicians and was hosted at the Princeton Institute for Advanced Study; it published its recommendations on September 29.

== Release ==
On 6 October, OpenAI released 722 manuscripts organized into 372 topics on the code-sharing platform GitHub. The topics spanned algebra, number theory, theoretical computer science, mathematical logic, probability theory and topology. The model used for the research was internal, and not released publicly. According to OpenAI, the model spent an average of 3 hours per result, and it had been tried on about 4,000 problems. Exceptions to this fixed procedure include work on a zero-free region for the Riemann zeta function and proof of the Hodge Conjecture for CM abelian varieties. While most results did not include contextual information like prompts or run-time details, ten results were accompanied by abbreviated prompts and chain-of-thought summaries.

=== Validity ===
Verifying and confirming whether the research is valid will take a long time, given some papers are hundreds of pages long and with dense calculations. Upon release, OpenAI researchers themselves had not been able to read through all the papers. Three papers were retracted within a day, and an additional 14 papers were revised. About half of the manuscripts were accompanied by machine-verifiable proofs, certified as correct by the automated logic platform Lean; however, verifying that the proof corresponds to the paper must be done manually; some of the formalizations appear to prove weaker results than those claimed in the papers. OpenAI disclaimed the validity of unformalized results.

== Example topics ==
Examples of topics covered by the papers include:

=== Number theory ===
- New zero-free half-planes for various L-functions:
  - For any cyclotomic field F containing twelfth roots of unity, and for any finite-order Hecke character η of F, the L-function L_{F}(s, η) has no zeros in the half-plane Re(s) > 1 − 10^{−6}.
  - If F is $\mathbb{Q}$ or $\mathbb{Q}(\sqrt{-3})$, then these functions have no zeros in Re(s) > 7/8. This includes the Riemann zeta function and all Dirichlet L-functions. If true, the new estimate would imply non-existence of Siegel zeros, leading to several results in analytic number theory.
- A direct proof that Siegel zeroes do not exist, independent of the new zero-free half-planes.
- An answer to Hilbert's tenth problem over the rational numbers: it is claimed that no general algorithm exists that can decide whether a given polynomial equation with integer coefficients has a solution, with the values of all unknowns being rational numbers. No Lean formalization was provided.
- Partial result on the Birch and Swinnerton-Dyer conjecture: elliptic curves over rational numbers whose Selmer group has corank 0 or 1. For such curves both the rank of curve and multiplicity of zero at $s=1$ of associated L-function are claimed to equal this corank and thus be equal to each other. The papers also include a proof of the conjectural formula for leading coefficient of the Taylor expansion at this zero, together with a proof of finiteness of the Tate–Shafarevich group for such elliptic curves.
- Catalan's constant is irrational.
- Contributions to the Langlands program.
- The irrationality exponent of π is 2.
- Every rational number a/b, with 0 < a < b, admits an Egyptian fraction representation with O(log(log(b))) terms.
- There are Gaussian moats of arbitrary width.
- An incomplete version of Artin's conjecture on primitive roots: every integer that is neither −1 nor a square is a primitive root modulo infinitely many primes.
- An extension of the modularity theorem to elliptic curves over imaginary quadratic fields.

=== Algebraic and complex geometry ===
- Partial result on the Hodge conjecture: for complex projective abelian varieties of CM type every class in Hodge cohomology is a rational linear combination of cohomology classes of algebraic subvarieties.

=== Convex and metric geometry ===
- Universal optimality of the triangular lattice.

=== Theoretical computer science ===
- A proof of the unique games conjecture in computational complexity theory was posted, accompanied by a formalization in Lean.
- Asymptotically faster method of matrix multiplication over the complex numbers, claiming that two n-by-n matrices can be multiplied using $O(n^{2.25+\epsilon})$ arithmetic operations, for any $\epsilon>0$; the previous record had an exponent of about 2.37. A Lean formalization was provided.
- A claimed improvement in integer multiplication: the paper gives a deterministic algorithm for multiplying two $n$-bit integers in worst-case time $O(n(\log n)^{1-\kappa})$, with $\kappa=2^{-182}$, on a fixed multi-tape Turing machine with a finite alphabet and one-dimensional tapes. If correct, this would disprove the Schönhage–Strassen conjecture (see Schönhage–Strassen algorithm) that $O(n\log n)$ is asymptotically optimal in this model. The paper only describes the constants and thresholds in the construction as extremely large.
- Discrete Fourier transforms can be computed using fewer than O(n(log n)^{1−c}) arithmetic operations, for an explicit positive constant c, in a computation model that permits exact complex arithmetic using unbounded coefficients.

=== Combinatorics ===
- Three-dimensional Euclidean space admits a finite translational aperiodic monotile.
- The solution to the Hadwiger–Nelson problem is not 5.
- Disproof of the Hadwiger conjecture: the paper claims to introduce a construction of loopless graphs that have no $K_t$ as a minor, but are not $t$-colorable.
- The Erdős–Turán conjecture is true.
- The crossing numbers of complete graphs and complete bipartite graphs were determined.

=== Topology ===
- A proof of the Hilbert–Smith conjecture related to Hilbert's fifth problem: every locally compact topological group acting continuously and faithfully on a connected topological manifold is claimed to be a Lie group.

=== Differential geometry ===
- A claimed counterexample to the nearby Lagrangian conjecture.

== Responses ==
The release of papers drew hundreds of responses from prominent mathematicians across many countries. Such academic responses were mixed and their varied focuses is demonstrated below.

=== Scale ===
Some mathematicians focused on the scale of the progress of the papers, enabled due to generative AI. Melanie Wood, a member of the advisory group that OpenAI claimed it would work with, stated it was "the beginning, not the completion, of the process of human understanding and the incorporation of the work into mathematical knowledge". Levent Alpöge called the release "obviously the most significant moment in mathematical history." Scott Aaronson, chair of computer science at the University of Texas at Austin, stated that the feel in math is as "a hunter-gatherer who's spent his entire life learning to survive deep in an unforgiving rainforest, then a giant resort hotel springs up right next to him with a helipad and heated pools and Airbnbs".

=== Fidelity of the research ===
Fields medalist James A. Maynard commented on the claimed proof of the quasi-Riemann conjecture, saying that the AI model drew from research in a technical corner of math that is difficult to connect to the Riemann hypothesis and “It’s putting together some ideas that were not terribly mainstream in an exceptionally clever way and making a jump”. Peter Sarnak of Princeton University said that he would not call the proof a "theorem" until humans verify and understand it. He repurposed an ongoing class he is teaching to study the proof.

Tristan Buckmaster, a mathematician at New York University, stated "I don't think they've done their sort of due diligence at all" given so many results were released at once. Andrew Sutherland, a mathematician at MIT, stated "Until and unless they release the model and people can replicate their results, I think you should treat any claims about one-shotting problems with a single agent as unverified".

=== Method of release ===
Some mathematicians were more skeptical about the process of release. Fields medalist Terence Tao contrasted in a talk "Math 1.0", a period characterized by proof scarcity, with "Math 2.0", when AI use had to be aligned with goals of human understanding.

Fields medalist Hugo Duminil-Copin said that "Tuesday night, I cried and it woke up my daughter", "They have annihilated my field of research" and that "They wanted to prove they could massacre us". A group of mathematicians calling themselves the Association for Human Mathematics published a statement saying "Mathematicians did not ask for this work to be done" and called the release a "demonstration of power".

=== Readability of the papers ===
Mathematicians have also criticized the quality of the preprints, with one of them being described as "so unintelligible that ... it would have gone straight into the bin" had it been submitted to a journal. Dana Moshkovitz, an expert on the unique games conjecture, described the OpenAI preprint on it as "so horribly written that it’s impossible to read it without AI help". Fields medalist Terence Tao was aware that OpenAI was working on the release beforehand and at the time called the coming results "toxic waste" and after the release "maybe treated waste".
