= Navier–Stokes priority controversy =

2026 scientific priority controversy

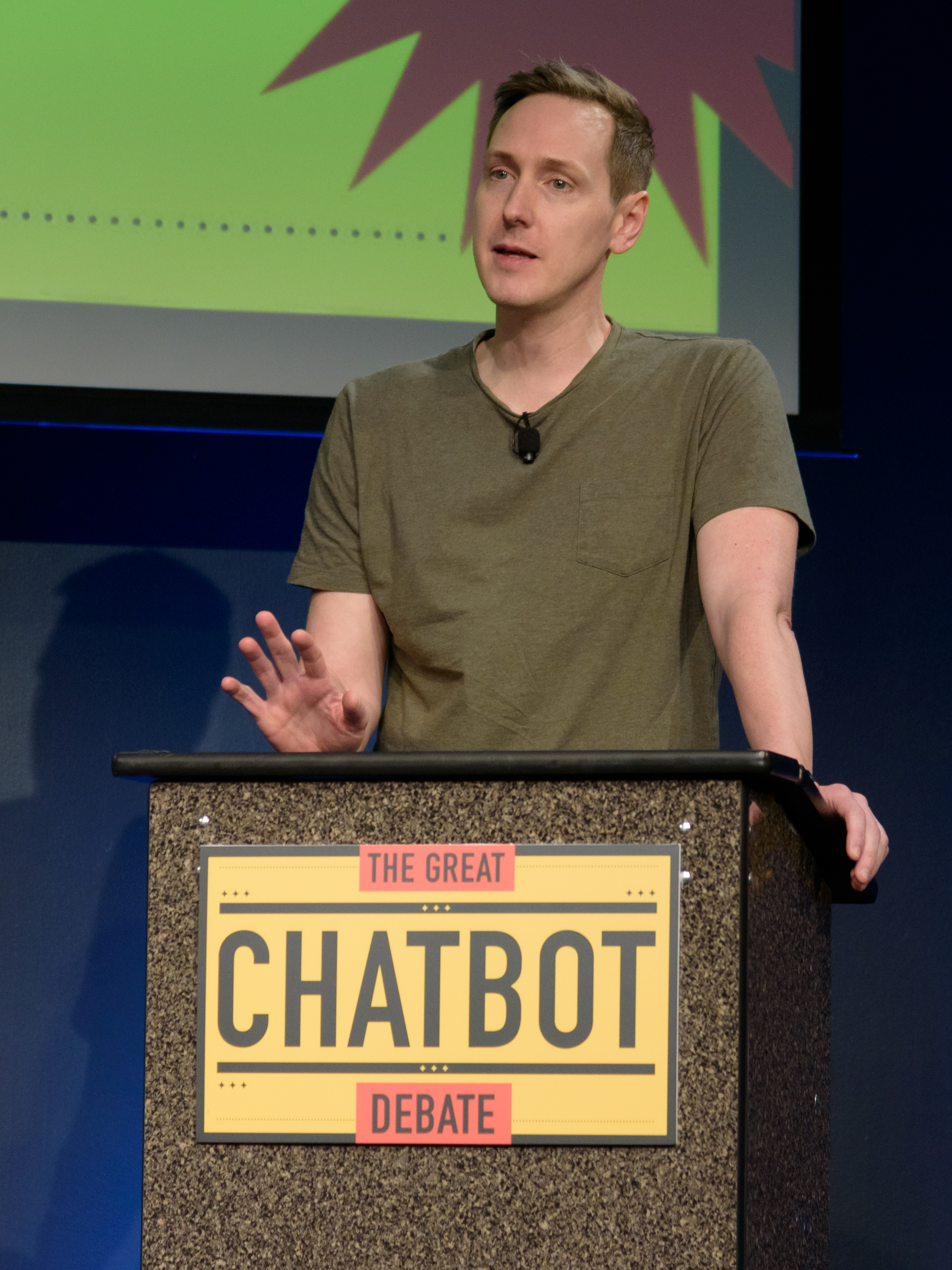
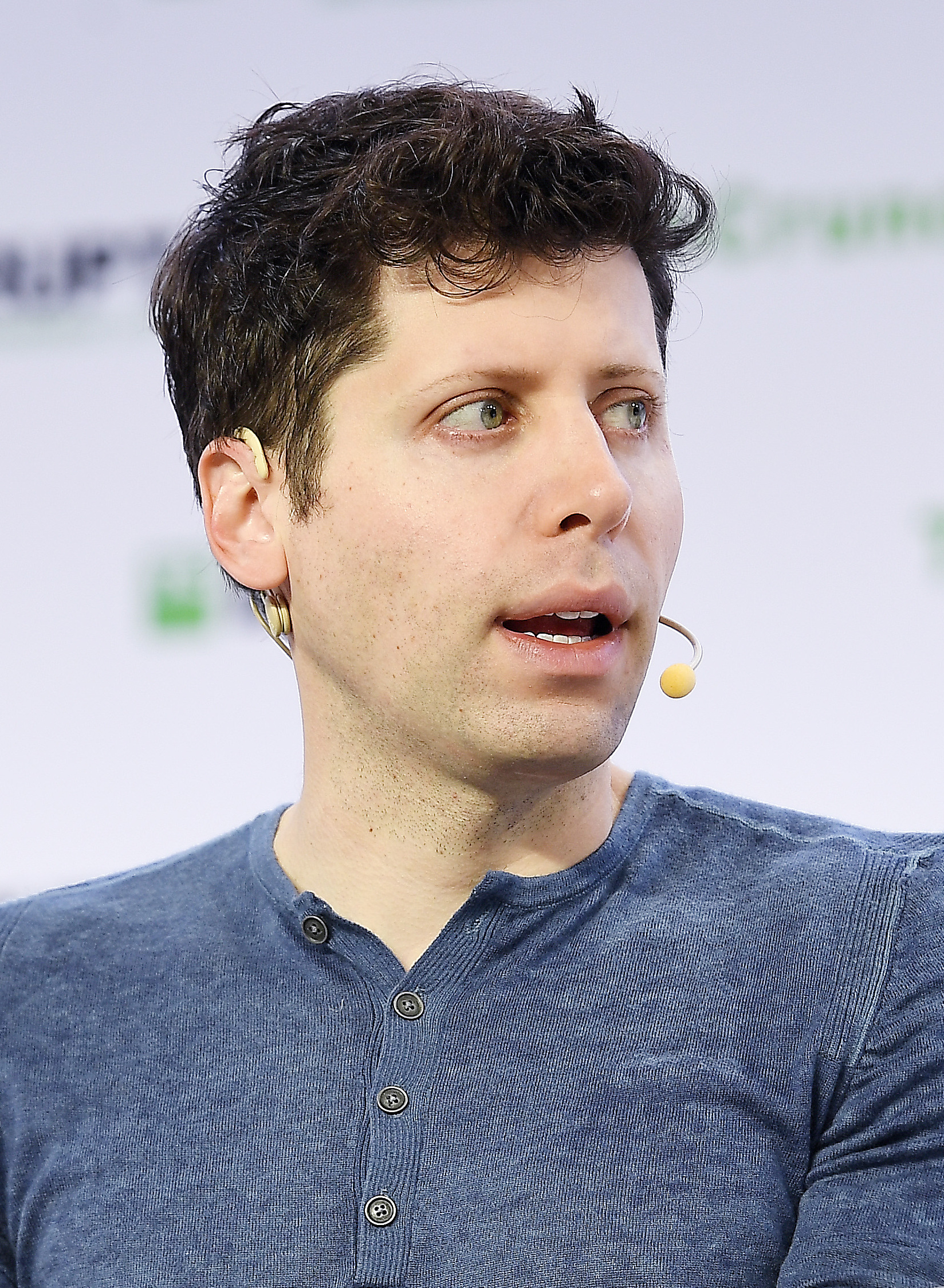
Left to right, first row: mathematicians Tristan Buckmaster and Levent Alpöge;
second row: OpenAI researcher Sébastien Bubeck and CEO Sam Altman

On 8 September 2026, artificial intelligence company OpenAI proposed a solution to the Navier–Stokes existence and smoothness problem with a smooth external force. However, approximately 12 hours before OpenAI's announcement, mathematician Tristan Buckmaster made a statement on behalf of himself and partly Levent Alpöge, saying that their recent advances on Euler equations (a special case of Navier–Stokes), reported in the same post, were leaked to OpenAI a few days earlier and may have inspired OpenAI's prompts for the agents in the process that led to the alleged solution. OpenAI denied such direct use of their work, saying that there are "significant" differences in proof methods in the Euler case.

Buckmaster made the statement after analysts tipped him and Alpöge that their "progress had been passed to OpenAI" and intended to narrate the events from his perspective lest "a sequence of announcements say something [he knows] to be false". OpenAI researcher Sébastien Bubeck later posted on X disputing some of Buckmaster's version of events, and Sam Altman, the CEO of OpenAI, retweeted Bubeck's statement and maintained that OpenAI had contacted Buckmaster and Alpöge in good faith, while Buckmaster's statement highlighted some communication from OpenAI that could be seen as hostile. Buckmaster also raised concerns about whether OpenAI could have accessed user data from Codex, an AI agent developed by OpenAI which Buckmaster and Alpöge used during their research, either directly or as anonymised training data.

The Clay Mathematics Institute listed solving one of four instances of the Navier–Stokes existence and smoothness problem as one of the Millennium Prize Problems and pledged to award US$1 million to any individual or group providing the first solution to each. (Note: The only time this pledge was invoked was in 2010 when Grigori Perelman's proof of the Poincaré conjecture was accepted, but Perelman rejected the prize, considering previous work of Richard S. Hamilton more fundamental and hence making the latter more entitled to the award.) The Buckmaster statement and the OpenAI announcement both confirm that OpenAI does not plan to claim the award, and the Institute has yet to acknowledge any party for a correct solution. Some observers have seen the controversy as part of competition in artificial intelligence, questioning the role of Alpöge's employment by rival AI company Anthropic; OpenAI stated they began large-scale work on all Millennium Prize Problems on 1 September, following rumours that Anthropic had solved two such problems. A declaration published on 11 September and signed by 28 Fields Medalists, titled A Severe Misalignment of AI in Mathematics, warned against "detrimental" impact on mathematics from AI companies treating unsolved problems as benchmarks without enhancing human understanding.

== Background ==
=== Work before Buckmaster and Alpöge ===
The Navier–Stokes equations are a system of partial differential equations that has the physical interpretation of describing the velocity and pressure of incompressible fluids in space, potentially in the presence of an external force (e.g. gravity). The Euler equations describe idealized inviscid flow, in which viscosity is neglected, whereas the Navier–Stokes equations include viscous effects. This idealization is distinct from superfluidity, a quantum phenomenon with properties that differ from those of a classical inviscid fluid. The Navier–Stokes existence and smoothness problem concerns smooth solutions of the three-dimensional Navier–Stokes equations with positive viscosity. Its formulations consider whether globally smooth solutions with bounded kinetic energy exist for smooth initial conditions, or whether finite-time breakdown can occur with a smooth external force. Charles Fefferman's problem statement for the Clay Mathematics Institute's Millennium Prize Problems asks to prove one of four statements, where the first pair (A) and (B) correspond to a positive answer to the question ("existence and smoothness") in the absence of an external force, and the last pair (C) and (D) to a negative answer to the question ("breakdown") in the presence of a smooth external force. Each pair is in two different settings of the space being unbounded or periodic.

In 2013, Guo Luo and Thomas Hou presented numerical evidence that solutions to Euler equations could reach a blowup singularity in finite time, tilting public opinion about the answer to the Navier–Stokes problem. Later, Diego Córdoba and Luis Martínez-Zoroa introduced new approaches for constructing finite-time blowup singularities in a series of papers from 2023. Ultimately, in collaboration with Fan Zheng, they arrived at an unforced blowup result for 3D incompressible Euler equations and a forced blowup result for so-called hypodissipative Navier–Stokes equations, a variant of the classical Navier–Stokes equations. Here, "unforced" means there is no external force present, and "forced" means the construction of such blowups revolves around deliberate choice of the external force. However, both results have gaps with the original Navier–Stokes problem, which excludes Euler equations and requires the external force to be smooth. Nonetheless, the two results together prompted beliefs that their strategy may be extended to the Millennium setup.

=== Buckmaster and Alpöge's collaboration ===
Tristan Buckmaster, professor of mathematics at the Courant Institute, revealed in a statement on the night of 7 September 2026 shortly before midnight that he and Levent Alpöge, a mathematician and an employee at the artificial intelligence company Anthropic, had been trying to close the aforementioned gaps for at least a year in secrecy, employing several large language models (LLMs) from both Anthropic and its immediate rival OpenAI in the research process. Buckmaster and Alpöge each stressed that their work is "a strictly personal collaboration" and not associated with Anthropic in any formal or legal way, while Buckmaster mentioned he had a collaboration with Google DeepMind.

Buckmaster and Alpöge's work produced smooth forcing results for Euler, incompressible porous medium (IPM), and Boussinesq equations, reported together in the same post that contains the statement by Buckmaster, which were obtained on 15 August 2026 and verified a week later in Lean, an interactive theorem prover based on type theory. According to the statement, they originally intended to delay the announcement since they wanted to produce human-written and readable papers that are the result of their own understanding of the proofs. Shortly after the post, mathematician Terence Tao congratulated the two in a blog post and on social media, calling the results "a remarkable achievement" and saying "there does not seem to be anything in principle preventing the methods from extending all the way to Navier–Stokes". Buckmaster recognises the importance of the work of Córdoba and Martínez-Zoroa, saying the latter deserves a Fields Medal, often considered the highest honour in mathematics. He left his office at 2:30 am on 8 September 2026.

== Dispute between OpenAI and Buckmaster–Alpöge ==
=== OpenAI announcement ===
After an 88-hour run that started on 1 September 2026, an internal multiagent system of OpenAI produced a 166-page paper, along with a computer-verified Lean formalisation, that OpenAI said establish Fefferman's alternatives (C) and (D) in an announcement at noon on 8 September, approximately 12 hours after Buckmaster's post. At least 10,000 agents were employed, which, in the immediate process that led to the Navier–Stokes solution, sent 2.7 million messages and spent 130 billion output tokens. It was estimated that the electricity cost alone would be in the order of millions of US dollars, which was confirmed by OpenAI researcher Noam Brown.

OpenAI acknowledged that Buckmaster and Alpöge's input to models of OpenAI via their use of Codex might have improved the model used for the run, whose training started on 28 August; on the same date, Brown said that OpenAI had already attempted Millennium Prize Problems but failed to produce any result. OpenAI explained that it was rumours about two Millennium problems being solved that motivated them to initiate an attempt at all six open problems using the model, with OpenAI researcher Sébastien Bubeck later further specifying that the rumours explicitly mentioned Anthropic resolved the two and were started by "viral [tweets]". It is not clear which tweets he is referring to, but Alpöge's tweet "Augustus Mirabilis" (miraculous August) on 31 August was cited as what led OpenAI to believe that, by extension, Anthropic had solved at least one Millennium problem. OpenAI further explained that they "later realized" the rumours were related to Alpöge and Buckmaster.

=== Buckmaster and Alpöge's contact with OpenAI before the announcement ===
According to both Buckmaster's statement and Alpöge's tweet the next day on 9 September, Alpöge received tips that his work with Buckmaster had been leaked to OpenAI. Prompted by this, the two mathematicians contacted OpenAI independently—Alpöge on the night of 2 September, and Buckmaster on 3 September (to an unnamed mathematician at OpenAI), expressing his confidence in potential advances on Navier–Stokes and his wishes against rushing an AI write-up and a Lean certificate. He was then later contacted by Bubeck, who insisted on meeting with him as soon as possible, still under the impression that Buckmaster and Alpöge had resolved Navier–Stokes instead of smooth forced Euler. Bubeck contacted both again on 6 September, first messaging Alpöge at 11:48 about OpenAI's resolution of Navier–Stokes which used "very little human input" and that they were "ready to share everything [...] including the human prompts" since he wanted "to be maximally open", and then later at 12:45 asking Buckmaster if they could meet "at any point today".

A meeting was held later in the afternoon between Buckmaster, Bubeck and the unnamed mathematician; Alpöge did not attend. Buckmaster, being told some more details about OpenAI's solution, made mathematical judgements that led him to the conclusion that OpenAI did pursue the path he and Alpöge had been working on, namely the Córdoba–Martínez-Zoroa programme. He also learned that a large team within OpenAI had been working on the problem and initially tried easier problems, including ones concerning Euler equations; he interpreted this as contradicting the "very little human input" Bubeck earlier told Alpöge, but Bubeck later explained that this meant the team did not contain experts in Navier–Stokes-related fields and hence there was no one from the team who could "meaningfully contribute to the mathematical content". Buckmaster then asked if OpenAI had direct access to files that he and Alpöge had input into Codex, including entire drafts of papers, or if OpenAI used sessions to train their models. OpenAI rejected the first during the meeting but admitted the second in the later post, albeit in a downplaying manner, saying that the data are "de-identified" and "derived" from their use.

OpenAI then proposed to Buckmaster that he first reports their Euler result before OpenAI announces their Navier–Stokes result, or, if he is willing, that he rewrites OpenAI's proof on behalf of the company, either as the sole author (per Buckmaster) or lead author (per Bubeck); but in any case the prize pledged by the Clay Mathematics Institute for a correct solution to a Millennium problem, one million US dollars, belongs to Buckmaster and Alpöge as they are the "closest humans to the problem". In the second proposal, both Buckmaster and Bubeck confirmed that the latter asserted against Alpöge being listed as author of the human-rewritten paper, citing conflict of interest. Buckmaster declined both offers, rejecting that he (in the first proposal) or Alpöge (in the second) be removed from authorship of work initiated by them. He pushed further that if OpenAI went ahead and announced their proof, he would make the dispute public; to which Bubeck asked why one would risk ruining their career over "unfounded accusations". Buckmaster in turn understood this as a threat, responded with confusion as to why going public would be career suicide and saying that he received a reply "if you don't want me to be nice, then I don't have to be nice." Bubeck apologised for his choice of words in his tweet after the OpenAI announcement.

=== Statements about possible use of user data ===
Buckmaster questioned whether OpenAI's internal model had used unpublished research material that he and Alpöge had entered into Codex. In its initial announcement on 8 September, OpenAI denied that its researchers or AI agents had accessed the mathematicians' specific user data to solve the problem, but acknowledged that it could not rule out an indirect influence from de-identified usage data.

On 10 September, OpenAI updated its announcement following an internal investigation, stating that Buckmaster's Codex prompts from the preceding two months could not have influenced the system, including through training. On 13 September, company spokesperson Laurance Fauconnet further stated that no user inputs submitted after 3 July could have influenced the system.

== Further responses ==
=== People associated with the two parties ===
After OpenAI's announcement, Buckmaster explicitly accused them on social media of "us[ing] customer's data to try to scoop their customer", citing OpenAI's admission to using user data for model training. Alpöge made the same accusation more implicitly in a tweet approximately one hour later. Buckmaster also criticised an earlier version of OpenAI's paper for having no references to the work of Córdoba and Martínez-Zoroa, which were later added in a new 166-page version. Professor at the University of Erlangen–Nuremberg Emil Wiedemann also pointed out that a longer list of references was expected for such a "monumental proof".

Bubeck called the meeting with Buckmaster "incredibly difficult". Sam Altman, CEO of OpenAI, retweeted Bubeck's statement and maintained that OpenAI has contacted Buckmaster and Alpöge in good faith. He emphasised that the methods of Buckmaster and Alpöge's work and of OpenAI's solution "appear to be different" and hence the two are independent—so did Ven Chandrasekaran, a researcher at the company—but Alpöge refuted this argument, saying OpenAI's proof "looks more along the lines of another Euler blowup proof we had". Alpöge also expressed disappointment in OpenAI's unwillingness to include him in the potential human-rewritten paper of OpenAI's solution and in their offering of the Millennium Prize, and ultimately in the failure of two AI labs to cooperate on science. A colleague at Anthropic, Sholto Douglas, shared the latter sentiment and offered sympathy in Buckmaster and Alpöge not being able to bridge their gaps to Navier–Stokes in the way they intended. Mark Chen, chief research officer of OpenAI, reiterated that "no people or AI systems searched through user data to solve this problem".

In a recounting of the events on the afternoon of 8 September, Buckmaster asserted that he did not have an interest in the prize money or even winning the race to the answer per se; he simply wished himself and Alpöge to be credited since they were "part of the [mathematical] story". He called the intention of OpenAI to remove Alpöge's authorship "the big sticking point", and considered himself to be an innocent bystander of the "petty games" or childish "petty drama" that is the rivalry between OpenAI and Anthropic, with the former on the evening of 9 September going further in their denying of using Buckmaster's Codex prompts, calling it "categorically impossible". On the general issue of changes to mathematics brought about by AI, Buckmaster considers the race for more papers and credit now "pointless" and calls for discussion within the mathematical community to re-evaluate the nature of the discipline and operational aspects including credit assignment and hiring.

=== Wider public ===
Terence Tao raised general concerns on his social media about the future of mathematical collaboration between humans; he worried that rumours about a mathematician's own work might prompt AI companies to invest huge efforts into pushing it instead of allowing the mathematician to develop their research to "full potential", whether the companies know about the details of the human mathematician's work or not. He also expressed dissatisfaction with the current conduct of AI companies "using press releases or social media posts to communicate mathematical results" instead of uploading preprints or arranging talks at conferences, not taking the mathematical obligation to push broader understanding of their results. Mathematician Michael Harris however said such high-level financial investments would not continue as "there is no profit in it"; however, he also worries that practices of AI companies related to mathematics would "convince decision makers that human mathematicians are obsolete, and [...] young people that their passion for mathematics has no future", hence "extremely damaging to mathematics". Professor at Queen Mary University of London Abhishek Saha agreed that there are few other such "high-caliber" problems that AI companies are willing to invest "such vast sums solving". Professor at Leibniz University Hannover Joachim Escher said asking every mathematical problem to OpenAI was simply impossible due to energy and capacity constraints, hence mathematics had not "reached its end". On the other hand, Wiedemann worries that mathematics will no longer be a competition between intelligence and diligence, but material resources. Mathematician Shing-Tung Yau also raised concerns that the disparity of resources held between AI companies and early career researchers could discourage the latter "to pursue ambitious questions".

Although Martin Bridson, president of the Clay Mathematics Institute, called the series of announcements "exciting", he stressed that the Institute requires a solution to a Millennium problem to be in the form of peer-reviewed publications, which would then be further scrutinised before the prize is awarded. Later on 11 September, the Institute released a statement acknowledging that "the Navier–Stokes problem has apparently been settled" but maintained the process for verification and credit assignment "is deliberately unhurried"; the status of the Navier–Stokes problem is now "active" instead of unsolved or solved on the Institute's website. Meanwhile, Ravi Vakil and John Meier, on behalf of the American Mathematical Society, congratulated both Alpöge–Buckmaster and OpenAI for "a milestone advance in human knowledge".

Joseph Perla, founder of model-routing company TrustedRouter, staunchly stands against OpenAI's decision and way of announcing their solution, saying "this is what all the labs do every day: read your chats and copy ideas". Mathematician Andreas Thom also pointed to the general "unanswered question" of lack of transparency between OpenAI and mathematicians, suggesting that models of the former have been "hoovering up unpublished human work and presenting it as AI generated". Lecturer at Monash University Melissa Lee raised similar concerns and warned researchers "to know very clearly what happens to unpublished work they enter into AI systems".

Professor at the University of Sydney Zsuzsanna Dancso accused OpenAI of failing to observe two fundamental ethics in science: "one is we acknowledge our sources, and two is we acknowledge our collaborators". Mathematician Peter Sarnak commended Buckmaster for "behaving the way mathematicians behave", while Alpöge previously also called him "a mathematician's mathematician" and praised him for his integrity. Martínez-Zoroa thanked Buckmaster for crediting him and Córdoba and "mak[ing] it clear that the ideas came from [their] group". Córdoba, initially in shock about the news and having been notified by neither of the two parties, acknowledged the current tendency to incorporate AI in mathematical research, but considered human-written proofs still essential and AI unable to find new original ideas in the foreseeable future; he stressed that "if [their] work had not existed, AI would not have solved the problem". Mathematician Steven Strogatz called Buckmaster "a real gentleman" and wished the Millennium prize money to go to Córdoba and Martínez-Zoroa; however, he feared that machines could learn and be skilled in even aspects of mathematics that are perceived as intrinsically human, including interpretation and communication for advancing human understanding, or appreciation and arbitration of aesthetic values in mathematical work.

On 11 September 2026, 24 Fields Medalists (later cosigned by four more) published an open letter titled A Severe Misalignment of AI in Mathematics, warning that the human foundation of interaction and student nurture and the core value of "conceptual understanding and insight" that form a "fertile ground" for mathematics could be eroded by the failure to hinder AI companies from continuing the "push" to resolve mathematical problems en masse. Such concerns have been put in the larger context of cognitive offloading and the possibility of humans becoming more reliant on AI tools for information processing and critical thinking.

On 6 October, a paper published on arXiv found discrepancies between OpenAI's Lean proof and natural language proof, finding the Lean proof "a great source for examples of [autoformalisation] mistranslations", and that the Lean formalisation does not represent a semantically faithful version of the natural language proof.

On 13 October 2026, Scientific American published an article surveying several mathematicians who concluded that OpenAI's Navier–Stokes proof diverged from the Córdoba–Martínez-Zoroa program, although OpenAI's intermediate unforced 3D Euler result shared the Córdoba–Martínez-Zoroa framework used in the 3D Euler blow-up proof of Buckmaster and Alpöge.

== See also ==
- Artificial intelligence controversies
- Mathematics and artificial intelligence
