= Millennium Prize Problems =

Seven mathematical problems with a US$1 million prize for each solution

The Millennium Prize Problems are seven well-known complex mathematical problems selected by the Clay Mathematics Institute in 2000. Each of the problems has a prize of one million US dollars for the first correct solution, pledged by the Clay Mathematics Institute.

The Clay Mathematics Institute officially designated the title Millennium Prize Problem for the seven unsolved mathematical problems, the Birch and Swinnerton-Dyer conjecture, Hodge conjecture, Navier–Stokes existence and smoothness, P versus NP problem, Riemann hypothesis, Yang–Mills existence and mass gap, and the Poincaré conjecture at the Millennium Meeting held on May 24, 2000. Thus, on the official website of the Clay Mathematics Institute, these seven problems are officially called the Millennium Prize Problems.

As of 2026, the only Millennium Prize problem to have been officially declared solved is the Poincaré conjecture. The Clay Institute awarded the monetary prize to Russian mathematician Grigori Perelman in 2010. However, he declined the award because it was not also offered to Richard S. Hamilton, upon whose work Perelman built.

In September 2026, artificial intelligence (AI) company OpenAI presented a proposed counterexample to the Navier–Stokes existence and smoothness problem, saying that they do not intend to claim the Millennium Prize for the result. In October 2026, OpenAI announced a proof of the Yang–Mills existence problem; however, the portion about the mass gap remains unproven. The proof was revised and validated by an independent team led by David J. Gross. In November 2026, Levent Alpöge claimed to have solved the Riemann hypothesis in its generalized version using the AI model Claude. The result was accepted by the independent Lean and Mathlib mathematical communities and endorsed by the Lean FRO and the Mathlib Initiative, in a joint statement. The Clay Institute does not consider proposed solutions to Millennium Prize problems until at least two years after publication in a qualifying outlet.

== Overview ==
The Clay Institute was inspired by a set of twenty-three problems organized by the mathematician David Hilbert in 1900 which were highly influential in driving the progress of mathematics in the twentieth century. The seven selected problems span a number of mathematical fields, namely algebraic geometry, arithmetic geometry, geometric topology, mathematical physics, number theory, partial differential equations, and theoretical computer science. Unlike Hilbert's problems, the problems selected by the Clay Institute were already renowned among professional mathematicians, with many actively working towards their resolution.

The seven problems were officially announced by John Tate and Michael Atiyah during a ceremony held on May 24, 2000 (at the amphithéâtre Marguerite de Navarre) in the Collège de France in Paris.

The Clay Mathematics Institute does not accept direct submissions of proposed solutions. Before a solution can be considered for a Millennium Prize, it must have been published in a qualifying outlet, at least two years must have passed since publication, and the solution must have gained general acceptance within the mathematical community.

Grigori Perelman, who had begun work on the Poincaré conjecture in the 1990s, released his proof in 2002 and 2003. His refusal of the Clay Institute's monetary prize in 2010 was widely covered in the media. In 2026, OpenAI claimed to resolve the Navier–Stokes existence and smoothness problem using an internal AI model, but its result has not been independently verified as of 2026. The other five Millennium Prize Problems remain unsolved, despite a large number of unsatisfactory proofs by both amateur and professional mathematicians.

Andrew Wiles, as part of the Clay Institute's scientific advisory board, hoped that the choice of US$1 million prize money would popularize, among general audiences, both the selected problems as well as the "excitement of mathematical endeavor". Another board member, Fields medalist Alain Connes, hoped that the publicity around the unsolved problems would help to combat the "wrong idea" among the public that mathematics would be "overtaken by computers".

Some mathematicians have been more critical. Anatoly Vershik characterized their monetary prize as "show business" representing the "worst manifestations of present-day mass culture", and thought that there are more meaningful ways to invest in public appreciation of mathematics. He viewed the superficial media treatments of Perelman and his work, with disproportionate attention being placed on the prize value itself, as unsurprising. By contrast, Vershik praised the Clay Institute's direct funding of research conferences and young researchers. Vershik's comments were later echoed by Fields medalist Shing-Tung Yau, who was additionally critical of the idea of a foundation taking actions to "appropriate" fundamental mathematical questions and "attach its name to them".

== Solved problems (per Clay) ==
=== Poincaré conjecture ===
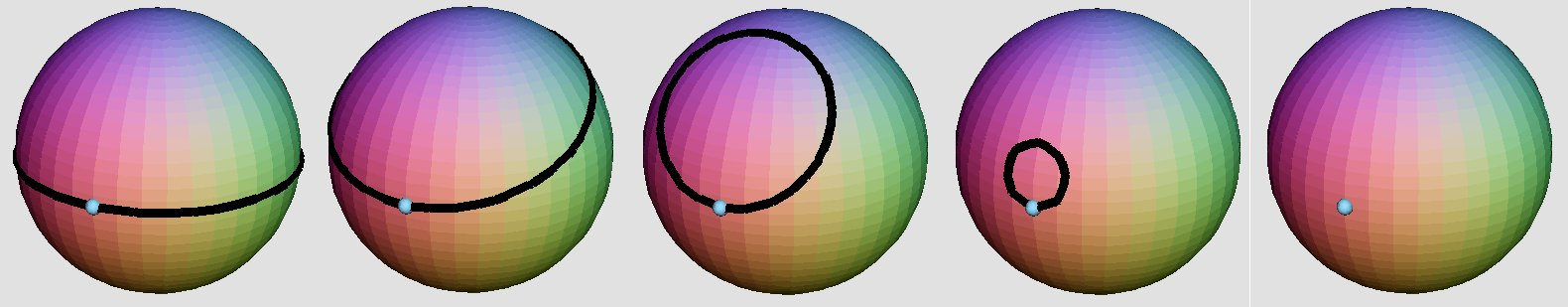
A compact 2-dimensional surface without boundary is topologically homeomorphic to a 2-sphere if every loop can be continuously tightened to a point. The Poincaré conjecture asserts that the same is true for 3-dimensional spaces.

In the field of geometric topology, a two-dimensional sphere is characterized by the fact that it is the only closed and simply connected two-dimensional surface. In 1904, Henri Poincaré posed the question of whether an analogous statement holds true for three-dimensional shapes. This came to be known as the Poincaré conjecture, the precise formulation of which states:

Any three-dimensional topological manifold which is closed and simply-connected must be homeomorphic to the 3-sphere.

Although the conjecture is usually stated in this form, it is equivalent (as was discovered in the 1950s) to pose it in the context of smooth manifolds and diffeomorphisms.

A proof of this conjecture, together with the more powerful geometrization conjecture, was given by Grigori Perelman in 2002 and 2003. Perelman's solution completed Richard Hamilton's program for the solution of the geometrization conjecture, which he had developed over the course of the preceding twenty years. Hamilton and Perelman's work revolved around Hamilton's Ricci flow, which is a complicated system of partial differential equations defined in the field of Riemannian geometry.

For his contributions to the theory of Ricci flow, Perelman was awarded the Fields Medal in 2006. However, he declined to accept the prize. For his proof of the Poincaré conjecture, Perelman was awarded the Millennium Prize on March 18, 2010. However, he declined the award and the associated prize money, stating that Hamilton's contribution was no less than his own.

== Active problems (per Clay) ==
=== Navier–Stokes existence and smoothness ===
$\overbrace{ \underbrace{\frac{\partial \mathbf{u}}{\partial t}}_{ \begin{smallmatrix} \text{Variation} \end{smallmatrix}} + \underbrace{(\mathbf{u} \cdot \nabla) \mathbf{u}}_{ \begin{smallmatrix} \text{Convection} \end{smallmatrix}}}^{\text{Inertia (per volume)}} \overbrace{{}-\underbrace{\nu \, \nabla^2 \mathbf{u}}_{\text{Diffusion}}= \underbrace{-\nabla w}_{ \begin{smallmatrix} \text{Internal} \\ \text{source} \end{smallmatrix}}}^{\text{Divergence of stress}} + \underbrace{\mathbf{g}}_{ \begin{smallmatrix} \text{External} \\ \text{force} \end{smallmatrix}} .$

The Navier–Stokes equations describe the motion of fluids, and are one of the pillars of fluid mechanics. However, theoretical understanding of their solutions is incomplete, despite its importance in science and engineering. For the three-dimensional system of equations, and given some initial conditions and possibly an external force, it was conjectured that smooth solutions always exist. This is called the Navier–Stokes existence and smoothness problem. The problem, restricted to the case of an incompressible flow, is to prove either that smooth, globally defined solutions exist that meet certain conditions, or that they do not always exist and the equations break down.

The official statement of the Millennium Prize's version of the Navier-Stokes existence and smoothness problem was given by Charles Fefferman, and asks to prove one of four statements (A), (B), (C), and (D). Statements (A) and (B) pertain to proving that smooth, globally defined solutions exist in the absence of an external force, while statements (C) and (D) pertain to constructing a solution with a singularity in finite time with a smooth force. Statements (A) and (C) are on three-dimensional Euclidean space $\mathbb{R}^3$, while statements (B) and (D) are on the three-dimensional torus $\mathbb{T}^3$.

==== Claimed blowup of the Navier-Stokes equation ====
On September 8, 2026, OpenAI posted a claimed solution to the Navier-Stokes equation satisfying statements (C) and (D) of the Millennium Prize problem, along with a formalized proof. As of October 2026, this solution to the Navier-Stokes equation awaits scientific validation, but the Clay Mathematical Institute wrote that "CMI shares in the excitement of the global mathematical community as we contemplate the announcement that the Navier-Stokes problem has apparently been settled."

The announcement also prompted a dispute over research credit. Mathematicians Tristan Buckmaster and Levent Alpöge had been working on related results, and Buckmaster alleged that OpenAI's research had been influenced by information about their unpublished work. OpenAI denied having accessed their work before its public release.

Martin Bridson, the president of the Clay Mathematics Institute, stressed that the institute requires a solution to a Millennium problem to be in the form of peer-reviewed publications, which would then be further scrutinised before the prize is awarded. Additionally, the Clay Institute only considers proposed solutions to Millennium Prize problems after at least two years since publication.

== Unsolved problems (per Clay) ==
=== Riemann hypothesis ===
The real part (red) and imaginary part (blue) of the Riemann zeta function $\zeta(s)$ along the critical line $\operatorname{Re}(s)=1/2$. The first nontrivial zeros can be seen at $\operatorname{Im}(s) = \pm 14.135$, $\pm21.022$, and $\pm 25.011$.

The Riemann zeta function $\zeta(s)$ is a function whose arguments may be any complex number other than 1, and whose values are also complex. For $\operatorname{Re}(s)>1$, the Riemann zeta function is given by the following convergent infinite series:

$$\zeta(s) = \sum_{n=1}^\infty \frac{1}{n^s} = \frac{1}{1^s} + \frac{1}{2^s} + \frac{1}{3^s} + \cdots.$$

Its analytical continuation has zeros at the negative even integers; that is, $\zeta(s) = 0$ when $s$ is one of $-2$, $-4$, $-6$, and so on. These are called its trivial zeros. However, the negative even integers are not the only values for which the zeta function is zero. The other ones are called non-trivial zeros. The Riemann hypothesis is concerned with the locations of these non-trivial zeros, and states that

The real part of every non-trivial zero of the Riemann zeta function is $\,\tfrac{1}{2}$.

A proof or disproof of this would have far-reaching implications in number theory, especially for the distribution of prime numbers. This was Hilbert's eighth problem, and is still considered an important open problem a century later.

The problem has been well known ever since it was originally posed by Bernhard Riemann in 1859. The Clay Institute's exposition of the problem was given by Enrico Bombieri.

On 20 November 2026, mathematician and Anthropic employee Levent Alpöge posted an AI-assisted proof to the generalized Riemann hypothesis, which implies the Riemann hypothesis. The proof was a formal proof written in the Lean proof assistant language, but without a natural language proof that is understandable by mathematicians. The formal proof was then verified by several independent mathematicians, and the Lean FRO and the Mathlib Initiative, in a joint statement certified its correctness.

=== Birch and Swinnerton-Dyer conjecture ===
This conjecture, named after Bryan John Birch and Peter Swinnerton-Dyer, deals with certain types of equations: those defining elliptic curves over the rational numbers. The conjecture is that there is a simple way to tell whether such equations have a finite or infinite number of rational solutions. More specifically, the Millennium Prize version of the conjecture is that, if the elliptic curve $E$ has rank $r$, then the L-function $L(E,s)$ associated with it vanishes to order $r$ at $s=1$.

The official statement of the Birch and Swinnerton-Dyer conjecture was given by Andrew Wiles.

=== Hodge conjecture ===
The Hodge conjecture is that for projective algebraic varieties, Hodge cycles are rational linear combinations of algebraic cycles.

$$\operatorname{Hdg}^k(X) = H^{2k}(X, \Q) \cap H^{k,k}(X).$$

We call this the group of Hodge classes of degree $2k$ on $X$.

The modern statement of the Hodge conjecture is:

Let $X$ be a non-singular complex projective variety. Then every Hodge class on $X$ is a linear combination with rational coefficients of the cohomology classes of complex subvarieties of $X$.

The official statement of the problem was given by Pierre Deligne.

=== P versus NP ===
Euler diagram for P, NP, NP-complete, and NP-hard set of problems (excluding the empty language and its complement, which belong to P but are not NP-complete)

The question is whether or not, for all problems for which an algorithm can verify a given solution quickly (that is, in polynomial time), an algorithm can also find that solution quickly. Since the former describes the class of problems termed NP, while the latter describes P, the question is equivalent to asking whether all problems in NP are also in P. This is generally considered one of the most important open questions in mathematics and theoretical computer science as it has far-reaching consequences to other problems in mathematics, to biology, philosophy and to cryptography (see P versus NP problem proof consequences). A common example of an NP problem not known to be in P is the Boolean satisfiability problem.

Most mathematicians and computer scientists expect that P ≠ NP; however, it remains unproven.

The official statement of the problem was given by Stephen Cook.

=== Yang–Mills existence and mass gap ===
In quantum field theory, the mass gap is the difference in energy between the vacuum and the next lowest energy state. The energy of the vacuum is zero by definition, and assuming that all energy states can be thought of as particles in plane-waves, the mass gap is the mass of the lightest particle.

For a given real field $\phi(x)$, we can say that the theory has a mass gap if the two-point function has the property

$$\langle\phi(0,t)\phi(0,0)\rangle\sim \sum_nA_n\exp\left(-\Delta_nt\right)$$

with $\Delta_0>0$ being the lowest energy value in the spectrum of the Hamiltonian and thus the mass gap. This quantity, easy to generalize to other fields, is what is generally measured in lattice computations.

Quantum Yang–Mills theory is the current grounding for the majority of theoretical applications of thought to the reality and potential realities of elementary particle physics. The theory is a generalization of the Maxwell theory of electromagnetism where the chromo-electromagnetic field itself carries charge. As a classical field theory it has solutions which travel at the speed of light so that its quantum version should describe massless particles (gluons). However, the postulated phenomenon of color confinement permits only bound states of gluons, forming massive particles. This is the mass gap. Another aspect of confinement is asymptotic freedom which makes it conceivable that quantum Yang–Mills theory exists without restriction to low energy scales. The problem is to establish rigorously the existence of the quantum Yang–Mills theory and a mass gap.

Prove that for any compact simple gauge group $G$, a non-trivial quantum Yang–Mills theory exists on $\R^4$ and has a mass gap $\Delta > 0$. Existence includes establishing axiomatic properties at least as strong as those cited in Streater & Wightman (1964), Osterwalder & Schrader (1973), and Osterwalder & Schrader (1975).

The official statement of the problem was given by Arthur Jaffe and Edward Witten.

On 26 October 2026, OpenAI announced an AI-generated proof for the existence portion, but not the mass gap. The existence proof was verified by an independent team led by David Gross. The mass gap, and thus the Millennium Prize problem, remains unproven.

== See also ==
- abc conjecture
- Hilbert's problems
- List of mathematics awards
- List of unsolved problems in mathematics
- Paul Wolfskehl (offered a cash prize for the solution to Fermat's Last Theorem)
- Smale's problems
- Kakeya set
