= Navier–Stokes existence and smoothness =

Millennium Prize Problem

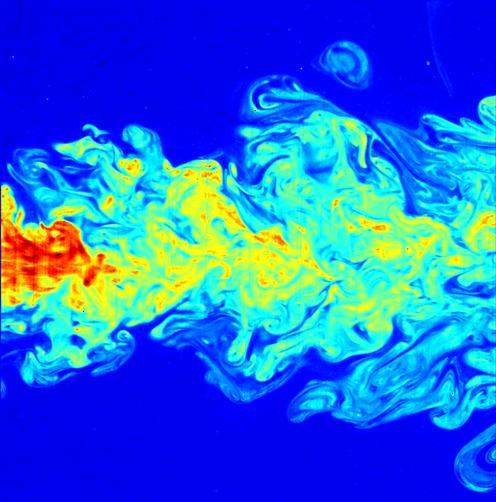
Flow visualization of a turbulent jet, made by laser-induced fluorescence. The jet exhibits a wide range of length scales, an important characteristic of turbulent flows.

The question of whether the Navier–Stokes equations always have smooth solutions in three-dimensional Euclidean space, given some initial conditions and possibly an external force, has been a longstanding unsolved problem in mathematics since the early 20th century. The equations are a system of partial differential equations that describe the motion of a fluid in space. Although computational solutions to the Navier–Stokes equations are used in a large number of practical applications, there is no complete analytical understanding of the solutions. In particular, solutions of the Navier–Stokes equations often include turbulence, which remains one of the greatest unsolved problems in physics, despite its immense importance in science and engineering.

In 2000, the Clay Mathematics Institute named four instances of the Navier–Stokes existence and smoothness problem - two dealing with the Navier–Stokes equation with no external force, and the other two dealing with the Navier–Stokes equation with a smooth external force - as one of seven Millennium Prize Problems because of the Navier–Stokes equations' critical importance to multiple fields. The institute offered a Millennium Prize to the first person providing a solution for one of the four specific statements of the problem as given by Charles Fefferman.

On 8 September 2026, artificial intelligence company OpenAI claimed to have found a solution to the Navier–Stokes equations with a smooth external force that develops a singularity in finite time in three-dimensional Euclidean space, along with a formalization in the Lean proof assistant, using a swarm of around 10,000 AI agents running an internal frontier model. Its solution resembles a spinning top that tightens to a singularity with diverging velocities. This announcement was accompanied by a priority dispute with Levent Alpöge (employed at rival AI company Anthropic) and Tristan Buckmaster, who had derived a set of closely related results on the Euler equations used in the work. The method used to generate the solution to the Navier–Stokes equation built upon a method developed by Diego Córdoba and Luis Martínez-Zoroa in 2023 to find blowup phenomena in related fluid equations. OpenAI stated in its announcement that it would not claim the $1 million Clay Millennium Prize for the solution it posted.

The Navier–Stokes existence and smoothness problem with a real-analytic external force or no external force remains unsolved. On 20 November 2026 mathematicians Levent Alpöge and Tristan Buckmaster published a proof of the formation of a blow-up without intervention of an external force; the correctness of the proof has not been confirmed yet.

== Navier–Stokes equations ==
In mathematics, the Navier–Stokes equations, named after Claude-Louis Navier and George Gabriel Stokes, are a system of nonlinear partial differential equations for abstract vector fields of any size. In physics and engineering, they are a system of equations that model the motion of liquids or non-rarefied gases (in which the mean free path is short enough so that it can be thought of as a continuum mean instead of a collection of particles) using continuum mechanics. The equations are a statement of Newton's second law, with the forces modeled according to those in a viscous Newtonian fluid—as the sum of contributions by pressure, viscous stress and an external body force. Since the setting of the problem proposed by the Clay Mathematics Institute is in three dimensions, for an incompressible and homogeneous fluid, only that case is considered below.

Let $\mathbf{v}(\boldsymbol{x},t)$ be a 3-dimensional vector field, the velocity of the fluid, and let $p(\boldsymbol{x},t)$ be the pressure of the fluid. The Navier–Stokes equations are:

$$\frac{\partial \mathbf{v}}{\partial t} + ( \mathbf{v}\cdot\nabla ) \mathbf{v} = -\frac{1}{\rho} \, \nabla p + \nu\,\Delta \mathbf{v} +\mathbf{f}(\boldsymbol{x},t)$$

where $\nu>0$ is the kinematic viscosity, $\mathbf{f}(\boldsymbol{x},t)$ is the external specific force (which may be understood as the component of local acceleration of the fluid that is due to an external force), $\nabla$ is the gradient operator and $\displaystyle \Delta$ is the Laplacian operator, which is also denoted by $\nabla\cdot\nabla$ or $\nabla^2$. Note that this is a vector equation, i.e. it has three scalar equations. Writing down the coordinates of the velocity and the external force

$$\mathbf{v}(\boldsymbol{x},t)=\big(\,v_1(\boldsymbol{x},t),\,v_2(\boldsymbol{x},t),\,v_3(\boldsymbol{x},t)\,\big)\,,\qquad \mathbf{f}(\boldsymbol{x},t)=\big(\,f_1(\boldsymbol{x},t),\,f_2(\boldsymbol{x},t),\,f_3(\boldsymbol{x},t)\,\big)$$

then for each $i=1,2,3$ there is the corresponding scalar Navier–Stokes equation:

$$\frac{\partial v_i}{\partial t} +\sum_{j=1}^3 \frac{\partial v_i}{\partial x_j}v_j= -\frac{1}{\rho}\frac{\partial p}{\partial x_i} + \nu\sum_{j=1}^{3}\frac{\partial^2 v_i}{\partial x_j^2} +f_i(\boldsymbol{x},t).$$

The unknowns are the velocity $\mathbf{v}(\boldsymbol{x},t)$ and the pressure $p(\boldsymbol{x},t)$. Since in three dimensions, there are three equations and four unknowns (three scalar velocities and the pressure), then a supplementary equation is needed. This extra equation is the continuity equation for incompressible fluids that describes the conservation of mass of the fluid:

$$\nabla\cdot \mathbf{v} = 0.$$

Due to this last property, the solutions for the Navier–Stokes equations are searched in the set of solenoidal ("divergence-free") functions. For this flow of a homogeneous medium, density and viscosity are constants.

Since only its gradient appears, the pressure p can be eliminated by taking the curl of both sides of the Navier–Stokes equations. In this case the Navier–Stokes equations reduce to the vorticity-transport equations.

The Navier–Stokes equations are nonlinear, because of the convective term $(\mathbf{v} \cdot \nabla) \mathbf{v}$.

== Statement of the problems ==
There are two different settings for the Navier–Stokes existence and smoothness problem. The original problem is in Euclidean space $\mathbb{R}^3$, which needs extra conditions on the growth behavior of the initial condition and the solutions. In order to rule out the problems at infinity, the Navier–Stokes equations can be set in a periodic framework, which implies that they are no longer working on Euclidean space $\mathbb{R}^3$ but in the 3-dimensional torus $\mathbb{T}^3=\mathbb{R}^3/\mathbb{Z}^3$. Each setting will be treated separately.

=== In Euclidean space ===
For the case of the Navier–Stokes existence and smoothness problem on Euclidean space $\mathbb{R}^3$, the initial condition $\mathbf{v}_0(x)$ is assumed to be a smooth and divergence-free function (see smooth function) such that, for every multi-index $\alpha$ (see multi-index notation) and any $K>0$, there exists a constant $c=c(\alpha,K)>0$ such that

$\vert \partial^\alpha \mathbf{v_0}(x)\vert\le \frac{c}{(1+\vert x\vert)^K}\qquad$ for all $\qquad x\in\mathbb{R}^3.$

Depending upon the version of the Navier–Stokes existence and smoothness problem, the external force $\mathbf{f}(x,t)$ is assumed to be a smooth function, a real analytic function, or equal to zero, and satisfies a very analogous inequality (now the multi-index includes time derivatives as well):

$\vert \partial^\alpha \mathbf{f}(x,t)\vert\le \frac{c}{(1+\vert x\vert + t)^K}\qquad$ for all $\qquad (x,t)\in\mathbb{R}^3\times[0,\infty).$

For physically reasonable conditions, the type of solutions expected are smooth functions that do not grow large as $\vert x\vert\to\infty$. More precisely, the following assumptions are made:

1. $\mathbf{v}(x,t)\in C^\infty(\mathbb{R}^3\times[0,\infty)),\qquad p(x,t)\in C^\infty(\mathbb{R}^3\times[0,\infty))$
2. There exists a constant $E\in (0,\infty)$ such that $\int_{\mathbb{R}^3} \vert \mathbf{v}(x,t)\vert^2 \, dx <E$ for all $t\ge 0\,.$

Condition 1 implies that the functions are smooth and globally defined (i.e. infinitely differentiable) and condition 2 means that the kinetic energy of the solution is globally bounded.

Existence and smoothness of the Navier–Stokes solutions in $\mathbb{R}^3$

The statement is that for any initial condition $\mathbf{v}_0(x)$ satisfying the smoothness, divergence-free, and decay conditions above, with the external force $\mathbf{f}(x,t)=0$, there exist smooth, globally defined solutions to the Navier–Stokes equations. These consist of a velocity field $\mathbf{v}(x,t)$ and a pressure $p(x,t)$ satisfying conditions 1 and 2 above.

Breakdown of the Navier–Stokes solutions in $\mathbb{R}^3$

There exists an initial condition $\mathbf{v}_0(x)$ and an external force $\mathbf{f}(x,t)$ with certain characteristics, such as smoothness, analyticity, or zero, on $\mathbb{R}^3$ such that there exists no solutions $\mathbf{v}(x,t)$ and $p(x,t)$ satisfying conditions 1 and 2 above.

=== On the torus ===
For the case of Navier–Stokes existence and smoothness problem on the torus $\mathbb{T}^3$, the functions sought now are periodic in the space variables of period 1. More precisely, let $e_i$ be the unitary vector in the i- direction:

$$e_1=(1,0,0)\,,\qquad e_2=(0,1,0)\,,\qquad e_3=(0,0,1)$$

Then $\mathbf{v}(x,t)$ is periodic in the space variables if for any $i=1,2,3$, then:

$$\mathbf{v}(x+e_i,t)=\mathbf{v}(x,t)\text{ for all } (x,t) \in \mathbb{R}^3\times[0,\infty).$$

Notice that this is considering the coordinates mod 1. This allows working not on the whole space $\mathbb{R}^3$ but on the quotient space $\mathbb{R}^3/\mathbb{Z}^3$, which turns out to be the 3-dimensional torus:

$$\mathbb{T}^3=\{(\theta_1,\theta_2,\theta_3): 0\le \theta_i<1\,,\quad i=1,2,3\}.$$

Now the hypotheses can be stated properly. The initial condition $\mathbf{v}_0(x)$ is assumed to be a smooth and divergence-free function, and depending upon the version of the Navier–Stokes existence and smoothness problem, the external force $\mathbf{f}(x,t)$ is assumed to be a smooth function, a real analytic function, or equal to zero. The type of solutions that are physically relevant are those who satisfy these conditions:

3. $\mathbf{v}(x,t)\in C^\infty(\mathbb{T}^3\times[0,\infty)),\qquad p(x,t)\in C^\infty(\mathbb{T}^3\times[0,\infty))$
4. There exists a constant $E\in (0,\infty)$ such that $\int_{\mathbb{T}^3} \vert \mathbf{v}(x,t)\vert^2 \, dx <E$ for all $t\ge 0\,.$

Just as in the previous case, condition 3 implies that the functions are smooth and globally defined and condition 4 means that the kinetic energy of the solution is globally bounded.

Existence and smoothness of the Navier–Stokes solutions in $\mathbb{T}^3$

For any smooth, divergence-free, spatially periodic initial velocity field $\mathbf{v}_0(x)$, with the external force $\mathbf{f}(x,t)=0$, there exist smooth, globally defined solutions to the Navier–Stokes equations on $\mathbb{T}^3$. These consist of a velocity field $\mathbf{v}(x,t)$ and a pressure $p(x,t)$ satisfying the periodicity and smoothness requirements above.

Breakdown of the Navier–Stokes solutions in $\mathbb{T}^3$

There exists an initial condition $\mathbf{v}_0(x)$ and an external force $\mathbf{f}(x,t)$ with certain characteristics, such as smoothness, analyticity, or zero, on $\mathbb{T}^3$ such that there exists no solutions $\mathbf{v}(x,t)$ and $p(x,t)$ satisfying conditions 3 and 4 above.

== Millennium Prize problem ==
The Millennium Prize problems were chosen by the Clay Mathematics Institute as the most important unsolved problems in mathematics. One of them concerns the Navier–Stokes equations and requires the prizewinner to have proven one of four statements. The first statement (A), which is known as the "smoothness" problem, states that there should always exist smooth and globally defined solutions to the Navier–Stokes equations in three-dimensional space. The second statement (C), known as the "breakdown" problem, states that there should be at least one set of initial conditions and external forces for which there are no smooth solutions to the Navier–Stokes equations. The other two statements (B) and (D) are the equivalent statements of (A) and (C) respectively on the torus.

There are four different statements for the Millennium Prize's Navier–Stokes existence and smoothness problem, two dealing with proving that smooth solutions always exist in the Navier–Stokes equations, and two dealing with finding a breakdown in the Navier–Stokes equations. There are different requirements for proving smooth solutions always exist for the Navier–Stokes equations and proving breakdown of the Navier–Stokes equations: A proof that smooth solutions always exist for the Navier–Stokes equations, given in statements (A) and (B), requires zero external force, but proving breakdown of the Navier–Stokes equations, given in statements (C) and (D), does allow for a smooth external force. Thus, statements (A) is not the negation of statement (C), and likewise statement (B) is not the negation of statement (D). Instead, we only have the following implications: $\neg (A) \implies (C)$, $\neg (C) \implies (A)$, $\neg (B) \implies (D)$, $\neg (D) \implies (B)$, and none of the reverse implications. Solving the Millennium Prize's Navier–Stokes existence and smoothness problem only requires solving one of statements (A), (B), (C), (D), which means that the Millennium Prize's Navier–Stokes existence and smoothness problem may be considered solved while one or more of the four statements (A), (B), (C), (D) may still remain unsolved.

In addition, there are other versions of the Navier–Stokes existence and smoothness problem not mentioned in the Millennium Prize, such as the Navier–Stokes existence and smoothness problem with a real analytic external force.

== Results ==
In 1934, Jean Leray proved that there are smooth and globally defined solutions to the Navier–Stokes equations under the assumption that the initial velocity $\mathbf{v}_0(x)$ is sufficiently small. He also proved the existence of so-called weak solutions to the Navier–Stokes equations, which may not satisfy the equations pointwise but do satisfy them in mean value.

In the 1960s, the finite difference method was proven to be convergent for the Navier–Stokes equations and the equations were numerically solved. It was also proven that there are smooth and globally defined solutions to the Navier–Stokes equations in two dimensions.

It is known that for a given an initial velocity $\mathbf{v}_0(x)$ there is a maximum time, T (the "blowup time"), for which the Navier–Stokes equations on $\mathbb{R}^3\times(0,T)$ have smooth solutions $\mathbf{v}(x,t)$ and $p(x,t)$. Either statements (A) or (B) are true, or T is finite for some $\mathbf{v}_0(x)$.

=== 2016 result by Terence Tao ===
In 2016, Terence Tao published a paper titled "Finite time blowup for an averaged three-dimensional Navier–Stokes equation", in which he formalizes the idea of a "supercriticality barrier" for the global regularity problem for the true Navier–Stokes equations, and said that his method of proof hints at a possible route to establishing blowup for the true equations.

Tao proved that for $\nu>0$, through rescaling of time normed to $\nu=1$ without loss of generality, and $\mathbf{f}=\mathbf{0}$, the existence of a smooth divergence-free (df) velocity $\mathbf{v}$ with given initial velocity $\mathbf{v}(-,0)$, which solves the Navier–Stokes equations, is equivalent to the existence of a "mild" solution $\mathbf{v}\colon[0,\infty)\rightarrow H_\mathrm{df}^{10}(\mathbb{R}^3)$. Let $\Omega\subset\mathbb{R}^3$ be an open subset, then $H^k(\Omega):=W^{k,2}(\Omega)\subset L^2(\Omega)$ is the Sobolev space of square-integrable functions, for which up to $k$ partial differentiations are also square-integrable. Through the restriction of the $L^2$-scalar product:

$$\langle-,-\rangle\colon H^k(\Omega)\times H^k(\Omega)\rightarrow\mathbb{R},
\langle u,v\rangle:=\int_\Omega u(\mathbf{x})\cdot v(\mathbf{x}) \, \mathrm{d}\mathbf{x}$$

it becomes a Hilbert space. There is a canonical inclusion $C_\mathrm{c}^\infty(\Omega)\subset W^{k,p}(\Omega)$ of smooth functions with compact support. Tao hence weakened the search for solutions with compact support to the larger space of the inclusion $C_\mathrm{c,df}^\infty(\mathbb{R}^3)\subset H_\mathrm{df}^{10}(\mathbb{R}^3)$. Let:

$$B\colon H_\mathrm{df}^{10}(\mathbb{R}^3)\times H_\mathrm{df}^{10}(\mathbb{R}^3)\rightarrow L^2(\mathbb{R}^3)\subset H_\mathrm{df}^{10}(\mathbb{R}^3)^*, (u,v) \mapsto - \frac{1}{2}L((u\cdot\nabla)v+(v\cdot\nabla)u)$$

be the Euler bilinear form with $\langle B(u,u),u\rangle=0$ for all $u\in H_\mathrm{df}^{10}(\mathbb{R}^3)$. $L$ is the Leray projection onto divergence-free vector fields, which in coordinates is given by $Lu_i=u_i-\Delta^{-1}\partial_i\partial_ju_j$ (using the Einstein summation convention) with the inverted Laplace operator $\Delta^{-1}$ being defined using the Fourier transform, hence $\widehat{Lu_i}(\xi)=\widehat{u_i}(\xi)-\xi^{-2}\xi_i\xi_j\widehat{u}_j$. With the normalized pressure $p:=-\Delta^{-1}\partial_i\partial_j(u_iu_j)$, one has $B(u,u)=-(u\cdot\nabla)u-\nabla p$ and the pressure is removed from the Navier–Stokes equations:

$$\frac{\partial u}{\partial t} = \Delta u+B(u,u).$$

Tao now considered this equation with an averaged Euler bilinear form $\widetilde{B}\colon H_\mathrm{df}^{10}(\mathbb{R}^3)\times H_\mathrm{df}^{10}(\mathbb{R}^3)\rightarrow H_\mathrm{df}^{10}(\mathbb{R}^3)^*$ with weaker properties, leading to fulfilling more inequalities, and still $\langle\widetilde{B}(u,u),u\rangle=0$ for all $u\in H_\mathrm{df}^{10}(\mathbb{R}^3)$. In this case there is indeed an initial velocity $\mathbf{v}(-,0)$, for which no "mild" solution $\mathbf{v}\colon[0,\infty)\rightarrow H_\mathrm{df}^{10}(\mathbb{R}^3)$ exists.^{2016}

This shows that a successful method to solve Navier–Stokes existence and smoothness must either rely on a finer structure than the simplifications above or on a property of the Euler bilinear form $B$, which its averaged variant $\widetilde{B}$ does not have.

=== September 2026 blowup result for Navier-Stokes with smooth forcing ===
On 8 September 2026, OpenAI stated that it had solved the Navier–Stokes Millennium Prize problem using an internal frontier large language model, demonstrating that there were initial conditions leading to finite time blowup. The company released a paper as well as a Lean formalization. On 6 October 2026, a paper published on arXiv found the Lean proof did not represent a semantically faithful version of the natural language proof.

OpenAI stated its research on Millennium Prize problems had begun on 1 September, following later-disproved rumors that rival AI company Anthropic had solved two Millennium Prize problems. OpenAI researchers used a model they had begun training on 28 August, as a swarm of around 10,000 AI agents, partially orchestrated by the OpenAI Codex tool. The agents initially evaluated all six unsolved Millennium Prize problems before being redirected to focus solely on Navier–Stokes after showing promising results. The swarm produced ~4.9 million messages and ~300 billion output tokens, with ~2.7 million messages and ~130 billion output tokens on Navier–Stokes specifically. The claimed solution was reached on 5 September after 88 hours of work. The effort cost millions of dollars in computation and electricity costs.

==== Dispute with Alpöge and Buckmaster ====
Shortly before the announcement, Tristan Buckmaster (a New York University professor) and Levent Alpöge (a researcher at Anthropic) had reported advances in Euler equations, a related field. A priority dispute started immediately. Buckmaster said that OpenAI adopted their research methods to solve the problem and attempted to exclude Alpöge from a joint publication proposal. OpenAI denied this and stated that its model had independently solved the Euler problem with different methods.

Also on 8 September 2026, OpenAI researcher Sébastien Bubeck wrote that OpenAI had begun work on Navier–Stokes partially following vague tweets by Alpöge, and that he had attempted to coordinate the publication of "concurrent discoveries" with Alpöge.

Buckmaster suggested that his work, which made extensive use of Codex, could have become training data for the internal model that OpenAI began training on 28 August and used for the solution. OpenAI acknowledged but downplayed this, announcing:

While unlikely, we cannot rule out that de-identified data derived from their usage of our products helped improve our models. However, our proofs differ significantly and even the precise results proved are different in the Euler case (forced vs unforced).

On 10 September, OpenAI announced that "Following an investigation, we have confirmed that Buckmaster’s Codex prompts over the two months preceding this announcement and paper … could not have influenced the system in any way, including through training."

==== Construction outline ====
The following is a rough outline of the construction given in the OpenAI paper. It does not give a direct expression for its solution, but rather constructs it implicitly. As of September 18, 2026, the proof of statement (C) has not yet been independently verified. The construction is a smooth solution, which resembles a spinning top that gets increasingly thinner as well as shorter and creates a velocity singularity for $t=1$ in a neighborhood around the origin, meaning:

$$\lim_{t\rightarrow 1^-}\|\mathbf{v}\|_{L^\infty(\mathbb{R}^3)}
=\lim_{t\rightarrow 1^-}\max\{|\mathbf{v}(t,\mathbf{x})|\,|\mathbf{x}\in\mathbb{R}^3\}
=\infty.$$

Nonetheless, for $t=1$ it is still required to fulfill $\|\mathbf{v}\|_{L^2(\mathbb{R}^3)}<\infty$ for finite kinetic energy. The basic description uses cylindrical coordinates $(r,\theta,z)$ with the solution being independent of the azimuthal angle $\theta$. Let $\ell_r$ be the characteristic radius and $\ell_z$ be the characteristic height, then $\ell_r\sim\tau^{1/2}$ and $\ell_z\sim\tau^{1/2-h}$ with the time $\tau=1-t$ to the singularity and a parameter $0<h<1/100$, with $\sim$ meaning that the expressions can be estimated against each other with just constants. The spinning top gets thinner more rapidly than shorter with $\ell_r/\ell_z\sim\tau^h$. Let $|u_r^{(0)}|$, $|u_\theta^{(0)}|$ and $|u_z^{(0)}|$ be the average velocities, then $|u_\theta^{(0)}|,|u_z^{(0)}|\sim\tau^{-1/2-h}$ and $|u_r^{(0)}|\in\mathcal{O}(\tau^{-1/2})$ with Landau notation. For the characteristic volume $V$, the characteristic velocity square $|u|^2$ and the total kinetic energy $T$, one has:

$$V\sim\ell_r^2\ell_z\sim\tau^{3/2-h};$$
$$|u|^2=|u_r^{(0)}|^2+|u_\theta^{(0)}|^2+|u_z^{(0)}|^2\sim\tau^{-1-2h};$$
$$T\sim|u|^2V\sim\tau^{1/2-3h}.$$

For $t\rightarrow 1^-$, hence $\tau\rightarrow 0^+$, the velocities diverge, although the kinetic energy $T$ does not, with $T\rightarrow 0^+$. The further description then transforms the time $t$ and the cylinder coordinates $(r,z)$ implicitly onto new coordinates $\eta\in(-1,+1)$ and $X,q>0$, the velocities $(u_r^{(0)},u_\theta^{(0)},u_z^{(0)})$ onto new functions $(V_0,E,U)$ and the pressure $p$ onto a new function $\Pi$ by:

$$A:=\frac{1}{2}+h, D:=\frac{1}{2}-h;$$
$$\tau=q(1-\eta^2), z=q^D\eta, X=\frac{r^2}{2q};$$
$$ru_r^{(0)}=V_0, ru_\theta^{(0)}=q^{-A}E, ru_z^{(0)}=q^{-A}U, p=q^{-2A}\Pi.$$

These notations are then used throughout the paper, in particular its central theorem 4.6. Translating additional conditions is not straightforward due to implicit coordinate definitions, although some already fit together. For example, the incompressibility becomes $\nabla\cdot u^{(0)} =\partial_r(ru_r^{(0)})+\partial_z(ru_z^{(0)})=0$, in which $V_0$ and $q^{-A}U$ can be directly substituted. The derivations are also not given in detail, only the results for incompressibility and regularity on the axis as well as radial pressure balance and vanishing at infinity:

$$V_0(0,\eta)=0;$$
$$\Pi(X,\eta)=\int_X^\infty\frac{E(x,\eta)}{2x} \, \mathrm{d}x.$$

The construction uses $\nu=1$ without loss of generality, like the 2016 result by Terence Tao, and expresses the forcefield-free Navier–Stokes equations as $\mathcal{R}(u,p)=0$ using the residual:

$$\mathcal{R}(u,p):=\frac{\partial u}{\partial t}+(u\cdot\nabla)u-\Delta u+\nabla p.$$

It is now required to show that the residual can be extended smoothly through the singular time $t=1$, although the velocities, which appear in the former three terms, diverge on their own. The proof uses the usual strategy established for partial differential equations to show this by inequalities for the partial derivatives (with respect to both space and time).

For the construction, the not-yet-determined force field $\mathbf{f}$ then allows a reverse approach: Instead of finding a solution of the Navier–Stokes equations with diverging velocities, one can use smooth functions $u$ and $p$ on $\mathbb{R}^3\times[0,1)$ and set $\mathbf{f}=\mathcal{R}(u,p)$ on $\mathbb{R}^3\times[0,1)$ to make them into solutions automatically. Special functions $u$ and $p$ are constructed, which both have compact support in a compact subset $\mathcal{K}\subset\mathbb{R}^3$. For every multi-index $\alpha\in\mathbb{N}^3$ and every natural number $j\in\mathbb{N}$, one then has that $\partial_x^\alpha \, \partial_t^jf$ for $t\rightarrow 1^-$ converges uniformly on $\mathbb{R}^3$ and there exist smooth functions $F_j\in C_\mathrm{c}^\infty(\mathbb{R}^3,\mathbb{R})$ with compact support in $\mathcal{K}$ and:

$$\lim_{t\rightarrow 1^-}\partial_x^\alpha\partial_t^jf(t,x)
=\partial_x^\alpha F_j(x);$$
$$\partial_x^\alpha F_j(0)=0.$$

This can be used to smoothly extend $\mathbf{f}$ onto $\mathbb{R}^3\times[0,\infty)$ with compact support in $\mathcal{K}\times[0,2]$.

==== Inability to be extended to the unforced case ====
On September 17, 2026, Peter Constantin, Mihaela Ignatova, and Vlad Vicol released a preprint claiming that OpenAI's method does not extend to the Navier–Stokes existence and smoothness problem with a real analytic external force instead of merely a smooth external force. This implies that OpenAI's method does not extend to statements (A) and (B) of the Millennium Prize's Navier–Stokes existence and smoothness problem with a zero external force, since a zero external force is real analytic.

=== November 2026 blowup results for unforced Navier-Stokes ===
On 20 November, 2026, mathematicians Levent Alpöge and Tristan Buckmaster published a proof of the formation of a blow-up without intervention of an external force.

== In popular culture ==
The Navier–Stokes problem features in The Mathematician's Shiva (2014), a book telling the fictional story of Rachela Karnokovitch, a prestigious mathematician who takes the proof to her grave in protest of academia. The movie Gifted (2017) referenced the Millennium Prize problems, including the Navier–Stokes problem.

== See also ==
- List of unsolved problems in mathematics
- List of unsolved problems in physics
