= Will Biederman =

American technologist and entrepreneur

- Citizenship: United States
- Education: University of Washington; University of California, Berkeley
- Occupations: Co-founder, Forest Neurotech
- Known for: Founding team, Verily; Co-founder, Forest Neurotech
- Awards: NSF Graduate Research Fellowship Program; DoD NDSEG Fellowship
- Scientific career
- Fields: Health technology, Continuous glucose monitoring, Brain-Computer Interface
- Workplaces: Forest Neurotech
- Doctoral advisor: Jan Rabaey

Will Biederman is an American engineer and entrepreneur. He was a founding Verily team member and led the development of the Dexcom G7 in the company's partnership with Dexcom. The G7 launched worldwide in 2022 and the partnership generated more than $500M of revenue for Verily, the most of any Verily program reported to date.

He is currently co-founder and CTO of Forest Neurotech, a non-profit Focused Research Organization developing the next generation of brain-computer interfaces using ultrasound.

== Education ==
Biederman received his BS in Electrical Engineering from the University of Washington, and his PhD in electrical engineering at the University of California, Berkeley under the advisement of Dr. Jan Rabaey. His work as a graduate student on miniaturized chips for brain-computer interfaces was subsequently licensed by Neuralink.
