= Jan M. Rabaey =

Belgian academic and engineer (born 1955)

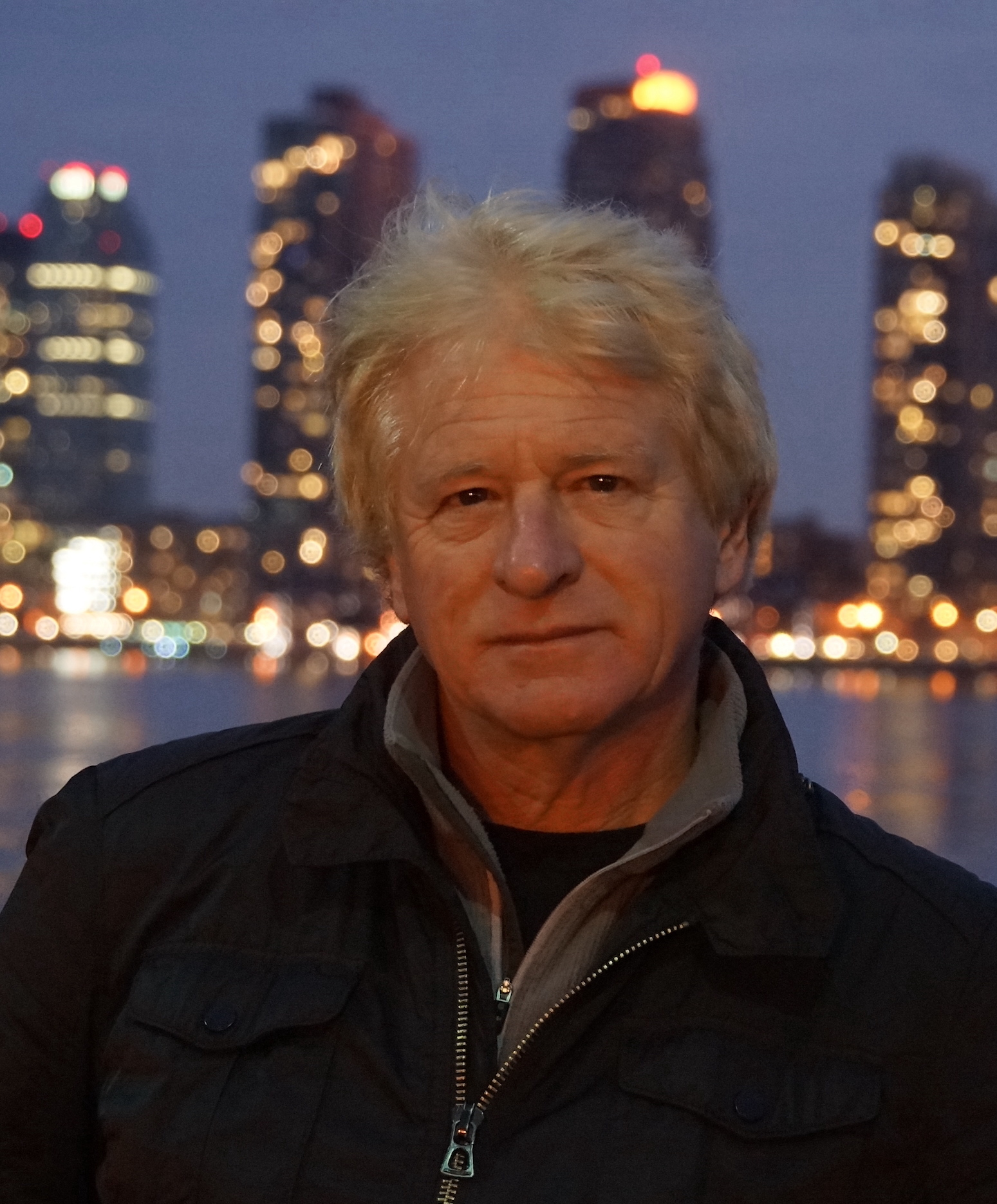
- Born: August 15, 1955 (age 71); Veurne, Belgium
- Education: Katholieke Universiteit Leuven
- Occupations: CTO, IMEC
- Known for: low power integrated circuits, advanced wireless systems, mobile devices, sensor networks, and ubiquitous computing
- Awards: IEEE Life Fellow, Royal Flemish Academy of Arts and Sciences of Belgium
- Scientific career
- Fields: Digital Logic, Integrated Circuits, Sensor Networks, Brain-Computer Interface
- Workplaces: University of California, Berkeley
- Doctoral students: Brian Otis, Will Biederman, Rikky Muller

Jan M. Rabaey (born August 15, 1955, in Veurne, Belgium) is an academic and engineer who is professor emeritus and Professor in the Graduate School in the Electrical Engineering and Computer Sciences at the University of California, Berkeley. He also serves as the CTO of the Systems Technology Co-Optimization division at the Interuniversity Microelectronics Centre (IMEC).

Rabaey has made major contributions to a number of fields including low power integrated circuits, advanced wireless systems, mobile devices, sensor networks, and ubiquitous computing. Some of the systems he helped envision include the infoPad, PicoRadios, the Swarm, Brain-Machine interfaces and the Human Intranet. His current interests include the conception of the next-generation distributed systems, as well as the exploration of the interaction between the cyber and the biological worlds. He is the primary author of the “Digital Integrated Circuits: A Design Perspective” textbook that has served to educate hundreds of thousands of students all over the world. He is an IEEE Life Fellow and a member of the Royal Flemish Academy of Arts and Sciences of Belgium.

== Biography ==
After receiving his Ph.D. degree in Applied Sciences from the Katholieke Universiteit Leuven, Belgium in 1983, he joined the University of California, Berkeley as a Visiting Research Engineer. From 1985 to 1987 he was a research manager at IMEC, and in 1987 he joined the faculty of the Electrical Engineering and Computer Science department of the University of California, Berkeley. He was the founding co-director of the Berkeley Wireless Research Center (BWRC) and the Berkeley Swarm Lab. He was director of the DARPA/SRC co-funded multi-university GSRC and MuSyC research centers, and served as the Electrical Engineering Division Chair at Berkeley twice. In 2019, he became professor emeritus and Professor in the Graduate School at Berkeley. That same year, he also became the CTO of the System-Technology Co-Optimization (STCO) division of IMEC.

== Awards and honors ==
=== Awards ===
- Presidential Young Investigator Award, 1989
- Analog Devices Career Professorship, 1990
- IEEE Signal Processing Society Senior Award, 1994
- IEEE Fellow, 1994
- Donald O. Pederson Distinguished Professorship in Electrical Engineering, 2001
- IEEE Circuits and Systems Society Mac Van Valkenburg Award, 2008
- European Design Automation Association Lifetime Achievement Award, 2009
- Gigascale Systems Research Center A. Richard Newton Industrial Impact Award for the PicoRadio Project, 2009
- Semiconductor Industry Association (SIA) University Researcher Award, 2010
- IEEE Donald O. Pederson Award in Solid-State Circuits, 2026, "for seminal and visionary contributions to the VLSI implementation of low-energy signal processing and communication systems"

=== Honorary degrees ===
Rabaey has received honorary doctorates from Lund University (2012), University of Antwerp (2017), Tampere Technical University Finland (2017), and Hasselt University (2021). He also received a Grand Professorship at the Technical University Dresden in Germany in 2014.

== Books ==
- Digital Integrated Circuits: A Design Perspective
- Low Power Design Essentials
- Ultra-Low Power Wireless Technologies for Sensor Networks
- Chips

== Personal life ==
Rabaey is married to Kathelijn, who has served as accountant and financial controller of a number of Bay Area companies and start-up's.
