= Levent Alpöge =

American and Turkish mathematician (born 1992)

- Alpöge in 2024
- Born: Levent Hasan Ali Alpöge; April 1, 1992 (age 34); Long Island, New York, U.S.
- Citizenship: United States; Turkey
- Education: Harvard University (AB, AM); University of Cambridge (MASt); Princeton University (MA, PhD)
- Known for: Hilbert's tenth problem; Jacobian conjecture; Navier–Stokes priority controversy; Riemann hypothesis
- Awards: Morgan Prize (2015)
- Scientific career
- Fields: Number theory; Mathematical logic; Artificial intelligence
- Workplaces: Harvard University (Society of Fellows); Anthropic
- Thesis: Points on curves (2020)
- Doctoral advisor: Manjul Bhargava

Levent Hasan Ali Alpöge (Note: Turkish: [alpœˈɟe] ahl-pur-GYEH. American English: /ˈælpoʊɡeɪ/ AL-poh-gay.) (born April 1, 1992) is an American and Turkish mathematician. He is known for his work resolving significant unsolved problems in mathematics using artificial intelligence (AI).

Alpöge was a junior fellow in the Harvard Society of Fellows and later joined the artificial-intelligence company Anthropic as a member of the technical staff. In 2025, he and collaborators gave a second proof that Hilbert's tenth problem has a negative answer over the ring of integers of every algebraic number field, a result originally established by Koymans and Pagano in 2024.

On July 19, 2026, he presented an explicit counterexample to the Jacobian conjecture in three-dimensional space, stating that it was discovered using the Claude Fable 5 AI model. He announced a counterexample to the Carathéodory conjecture on August 19 using the model. Four days later, he announced a positive answer to Hopf's problem concerning the existence of a complex structure on a 6-dimensional sphere.

His AI-assisted work on Navier–Stokes existence and smoothness with Tristan Buckmaster was cited by OpenAI in their solution to the Millennium Prize Problem on September 8, 2026. The solution came under priority controversy after Buckmaster alleged that OpenAI accessed his private work.

On November 20, 2026, Alpöge announced a proof of the Riemann hypothesis, formalized in the Lean 4 proof language, developed with the assistance of an unreleased Anthropic AI model. The ideas in the proof are not yet understood by independent mathematicians.

== Early life and education ==
Levent Alpöge in 2018

Alpöge was born on April 1, 1992, and grew up on Long Island, New York, where he attended Half Hollow Hills High School West in Dix Hills, New York. He holds dual United States and Turkish citizenship.

In 2010, he was a finalist in the Intel Science Talent Search for a computer-science project on the algorithmic analysis of MRI scans of blood vessels. His earliest publication, on a CUDA-optimized vessel-detection method, dates from the same period. He earned a Barry Goldwater Scholarship. The main-belt asteroid 25898 Alpöge is named after him.

Alpöge studied at Harvard University, where he received a Bachelor of Arts in mathematics and a Master of Arts in physics in 2014, graduating summa cum laude. His undergraduate thesis, The average elliptic curve has few integral points, was supervised by Jacob Tsimerman, a Fields Medalist.

After earning a graduate fellowship from the National Science Foundation, Alpöge studied Part III of the Mathematical Tripos at the University of Cambridge as a Churchill Scholar, earning a Master of Advanced Studies degree in 2015. He received a doctorate from Princeton University in 2020 with a dissertation titled Points on Curves, supervised by Fields Medalist Manjul Bhargava.

== Career ==
After completing his doctorate, Alpöge held an NSF postdoctoral fellowship affiliated with Columbia University and Harvard from 2020, and was a Junior Fellow in the Harvard Society of Fellows from 2021 to 2025. He subsequently joined the artificial-intelligence company Anthropic as a member of the technical staff.

Alpöge works in number theory and arithmetic statistics, including the study of rational and integral points on elliptic and higher-genus curves, Selmer groups, and the distribution of arithmetic invariants of number fields.

=== Sums of two rational cubes ===
With Manjul Bhargava and Ari Shnidman, Alpöge established the first proven bounds on the proportion of integers that can be written as a sum of two cubes of rational numbers. Their 2022 work showed that at most about five-sixths of integers are so expressible, combining geometry of numbers techniques with the circle method. The upper bound for the density of integers that are so expressible has been subsequently improved to 68.05% by Peter Koymans and Alexander Smith.

=== Hilbert's tenth problem over number fields ===
In a paper published in Inventiones Mathematicae in 2025, Alpöge, Bhargava, Wei Ho, and Ari Shnidman proved that for any quadratic extension of number fields $K/F$ there exists an abelian variety over $F$ of positive rank whose rank does not grow after base change to $K$. This implies that Hilbert's tenth problem has a negative solution over the ring of integers of every algebraic number field—that is, there is no algorithm to decide whether a polynomial equation has solutions in that ring. The result gave an alternative completion of a program relating Hilbert's tenth problem to the rank stability of elliptic curves and abelian varieties initiated by Bjorn Poonen, Barry Mazur, Karl Rubin, and Alexandra Shlapentokh; the Mazur—Rubin-Poonen-Shlapentokh program had been completed in 2024 by Peter Koymans and Carlo Pagano, using instead elliptic curves.

== AI-assisted research ==
=== Jacobian conjecture counterexample ===
In July 2026, Alpöge announced on the social-media platform X that Anthropic's Claude Fable 5 large language model had found a counterexample to the Jacobian conjecture, a problem in algebraic geometry begun by Ludwig Kraus in 1884 and formally posed by Ott-Heinrich Keller in 1939. The example is a polynomial map from three-dimensional complex space to itself whose Jacobian determinant is the nonzero constant −2 but which is not injective, disproving the conjecture in dimensions three and above. The two-variable case of the conjecture remains open. The announcement was made outside of formal peer review, and the arithmetic of the example was independently checked by other mathematicians in the days that followed.

=== Hadamard matrices ===
On August 12, 2026, Alpöge announced on X that, together with Philippe Voinov and Saul Reynolds-Haertle and with help from Claude, he had constructed Hadamard matrices for all twelve orders below 2000 for which no such matrix had previously been known, namely 668, 716, 892, 1132, 1244, 1388, 1436, 1676, 1772, 1916, 1948 and 1964. Order 668 had been the smallest open case of the Hadamard conjecture since 2005.

=== Carathéodory conjecture counterexample ===
On August 19, 2026, he announced an explicit $C^\infty$ counterexample for the Carathéodory conjecture checked with John-Paul Smith and Anthropic's artificial-intelligence system Claude. Once again the result was announced in a tweet, but on this occasion Alpöge offered a more comprehensive backstory, asserting that "i literally wanted to just read about it but i did see the complicated literature situation and so in hopes i could help asked him if it was ok to look at with a model" before confirming that "i did wanna have it recorded somewhere public though" and then giving the example.

=== Hopf's problem ===
Alpöge announced an answer to Hopf's problem on X on August 23, 2026, stating that one of Anthropic's models had constructed a complex manifold structure on a 6-dimensional sphere. The same day Alpöge published a 100-page document containing a proof of the positive solution on his personal website.

Proposed formalizations by Dean Cureton and by Boris Alexeev were subsequently posted on GitHub, and Philip Engel published some notes about the proof. Manon Bischoff reported on the finding in Spektrum der Wissenschaft, the German language edition of Scientific American.

=== Navier–Stokes existence and smoothness ===
Alpöge worked with New York University mathematician Tristan Buckmaster on the Navier–Stokes existence and smoothness problem, one of the seven Millennium Prize Problems. On August 15, 2026, the pair proved that the Euler equations, the frictionless counterpart of Navier–Stokes, can "blow up" in finite time, extending a forcing technique developed by Diego Córdoba and Luis Martínez-Zoroa. After verifying the proof in Lean, the pair published a preprint establishing finite-time blow-up with smooth forcing for the incompressible porous medium equation, the 2D Boussinesq system, and the 3D incompressible Euler equations, using Anthropic's Claude and OpenAI's Codex in the work.

After word of the pair's progress reached OpenAI, a team led by OpenAI scientist Sébastien Bubeck used an internal model to find a solution for Navier–Stokes equations. On September 8, 2026, OpenAI announced a full solution to the problem that resembled the approach used by the pair. Buckmaster suggested OpenAI researchers may have accessed private work he had stored in a Codex session before publication.

On November 20, 2026, Alpöge and Buckmaster released an AI-assisted paper and Lean formalization claiming that the equations can blow up in finite time without external forcing, along with a companion paper, coauthored with Matei Coiculescu, claiming the same for the Euler equations.

=== Riemann hypothesis ===
In November 2026, Alpöge posted a note on his personal website stating that Anthropic's Claude had found a proof of the Riemann hypothesis, which he said extends to the generalized Riemann hypothesis for Dirichlet L-functions. Rather than a conventional paper, the claim was accompanied by a Lean formalization of the proof posted on the same website. The note states that Claude also produced a full written account of the proof ('a travesty of "slop"') that runs to more than 250,000 pages and remains unpublished. The Lean-formalized proof of the generalized Riemann hypothesis was confirmed to be correct by the Lean/Mathlib community on the following day.

== Awards and honors ==
- Morgan Prize (2015)
- Sophia Freund Prize, Harvard University (2014)
- Captain Jonathan Fay Prize, Harvard Radcliffe Institute (2014)

== Selected publications ==
- Alpöge, Levent; Bhargava, Manjul; Ho, Wei; Shnidman, Ari (December 2025). "Rank stability in quadratic extensions and Hilbert's tenth problem for the ring of integers of a number field". Inventiones Mathematicae. 243: 1129–1139. arXiv:2501.18774. doi:10.1007/s00222-025-01392-3.
- Alpöge, Levent; Bhargava, Manjul; Shnidman, Ari (2022). "Integers expressible as the sum of two rational cubes". arXiv:2210.10730 [math.NT].
- Alpöge, Levent; Bhargava, Manjul; Shnidman, Ari (2020). "A positive proportion of cubic fields are not monogenic yet have no local obstruction to being so". arXiv:2011.01186 [math.NT].
- Alpöge, Levent (2017). "Square-root cancellation for the signs of Latin squares". Combinatorica. arXiv:1412.7574.
- Alpöge, Levent (2014). "Self-conjugate core partitions and modular forms". Journal of Number Theory. 140: 60–92. arXiv:1307.0158.
