= Competition in artificial intelligence =

Rivalries among developers of AI systems

Competition in artificial intelligence refers to the rivalry among companies, research institutions, and governments to develop and deploy the most capable artificial intelligence (AI) systems. The competition spans multiple domains, including large language models (LLMs), autonomous vehicles, robotics, computer vision systems, natural language processing (NLP), and AI-optimized hardware.

== Background ==
Competition in AI is driven by potential economic, strategic, and scientific advantages. Breakthroughs in AI can enhance productivity, enable new products and services, and provide geopolitical leverage. The field has experienced rapid progress since the mid-2010s, particularly in machine learning and artificial neural networks, leading to intense rivalry among leading actors.

== Corporate competition ==
Major technology companies are among the most visible competitors in AI. In the United States, firms such as OpenAI, Google DeepMind, Meta Platforms, Microsoft, Anthropic, SpaceXAI, and Nvidia compete in building advanced LLMs, generative AI platforms, and AI-optimized graphics processing units (GPUs). In China, companies such as Baidu, Alibaba Group, Tencent, and startups such DeepSeek have become leaders in AI deployment, often with state backing.

The "war for talent" in AI research has become a defining feature of corporate competition. Leading firms often recruit top AI researchers from rivals, sometimes offering multi-million-dollar compensation packages.

== National competition ==
Governments see leadership in AI as a strategic priority. The United States has funded AI research for military, economic, and societal applications, while China has set a target to lead the world in AI by 2030 through its "New Generation Artificial Intelligence Development Plan". Other nations, including the UK, India, Israel, Russia, South Korea, and members of the European Union, have launched national AI strategies.

In February 2026 Anthropic said Chinese companies DeepSeek, Moonshot AI, and MiniMax were conducting "distillation attacks" in an attempt to copy their model's capabilities, and warned that business wars were closely tied to geopolitical ones: "foreign labs that illicitly distill American models can remove safeguards, feeding model capabilities into their own military, intelligence, and surveillance systems."

== Sectors of competition ==
=== Large language models and chatbots competition ===
Competition to produce the most capable generative text models, with benchmarks such as MMLU and ARC used to evaluate performance has been on scale since the emergence of AI. These systems leverage deep learning, especially transformer architectures, to understand and generate human-like language. Companies and research groups globally compete to develop chatbots that are more capable, reliable, and context-aware. Among the most well-known chatbots is ChatGPT, developed by OpenAI. Since its public release in 2022, ChatGPT has rapidly gained widespread attention for its ability to engage in coherent and versatile conversations, assist with creative writing, and solve complex problems. In response, technology firms introduced competing chatbots aiming to challenge or surpass ChatGPT's capabilities. Notably, DeepSeek, a Chinese AI company, launched an advanced chatbot integrated with their R1 language model, emphasizing strong natural language understanding and multilingual support. Similarly, Grok, developed by xAI (company), integrates conversational AI into vehicles and digital assistants, combining natural language processing with real-time data for personalized user interaction.

These chatbots not only compete in language tasks but also demonstrate strategic reasoning capabilities by playing complex games such as chess and Go. This form of competition is reminiscent of historic AI milestones set by programs such as Deep Blue and AlphaGo. The OpenAI’s ChatGPT has been tested in playing chess at various levels, while DeepSeek’s chatbot showcased its prowess in online chess tournaments in early 2024, winning several matches against human and AI opponents. Grok, leveraging Tesla's vast data infrastructure, has demonstrated real-time strategic decision-making in simulation environments that include chess-like games.

The competition pushes rapid innovation, with firms racing to improve chatbot conversational depth, reduce biases, increase factual accuracy, and integrate multimodal inputs like images and videos. At the same time, the competition raises questions about AI safety, ethical use, and the societal impacts of increasingly human-like chatbots.

=== Autonomous vehicles ===
Companies such as Waymo, Tesla, and Baidu are racing to deploy safe and reliable self-driving car technology.

=== AI chips ===
Rivalry between Nvidia, AMD, Intel, and Huawei in designing processors optimized for AI workloads.

=== Military applications ===
Development of AI-enabled drones, surveillance systems, and decision-support tools, with associated ethical debates.

== Events ==
- In 2022, Tesla and Waymo both expanded autonomous taxi services in U.S. cities, competing for regulatory approval and public trust.
- In 2023, OpenAI released GPT-4, prompting competitors such as Google DeepMind to accelerate the release of their own models, including Gemini.
- The U.S. Department of Defense's Project Maven and China's AI-enabled surveillance programs have been cited as examples of military AI rivalry.
- In 2024, Chinese AI company DeepSeek launched the R1 model, leading OpenAI to release an open-source system, GPT-OSS, as a strategic countermeasure.
- In 2025, Microsoft hired several senior engineers from Google DeepMind, highlighting the ongoing "talent poaching" competition in the AI sector.

== Risks and concerns ==
Critics warn that unrestrained competition in AI can undermine safety, ethics, and governance. Concerns include the proliferation of biased or unsafe models, escalation in autonomous weapons, and reduced cooperation on safety standards. "AI Constitutionalism" (AI constitutions being the "high-level, public-facing documents that specify the principles, rules, and cases intended to align the [AI] model with the lab’s mission") has been suggested as one way of regulating frontier AI systems. Different countries have taken significantly varying approaches to managing AI in their jurisdictions.

== See also ==
- Artificial intelligence
- Artificial general intelligence
- Technological singularity
- Space Race
