= Convergent Research =

Incubator for philanthropic ventures

Convergent Research is an incubator for philanthropic ventures founded in 2021 and funded by Eric Schmidt, Wendy Schmidt and Ken Griffin as part of the Schmidt Sciences Network. Convergent Research is designed to identify high-impact scientific or technological R&D fields, then launch companies to address these fields with a structure they call Focused Research Organizations (FROs). As of 2026, there are 15 FROs.

== Focused Research Organizations (FROs) ==
A Focused Research Organization, or FRO, is a type of non-profit organization designed to address technical problems or perform scientific research. Unlike academic research labs, that they have medium-to-large size teams with corporate structures, embrace projects which are unlikely to yield publishable results, and frequently involve scientists and engineers collaborating across disciplines. Unlike a startup company, a FRO project is not profitable enough in its initial stages. Unlike think tanks or research institutes, they tend to pursue specific technical goals rather than general research. Once their technical goals are achieved, FROs may evolve into more traditional non-profits, or become backed by venture capital and transform into startups.

== List of FROs ==
- Development for Lean (proof assistant) is supported by a FRO.
- E11 Bio has a goal of creating a single-cell neural circuit mapping tool.
- Cultivarium
- ParallelSq Technology Institute
- EvE Bio
- Arbor Neuroscience (previously Forest Neurotech)
- Imprint
- [C]Worthy
- CHI FRO
- Dragonfly
- Atlas Ignota
- Echo Labs
- Melody
- Meridial
- Oath
