= Abhyankar =

Abhyankar or Abhyankkar is a surname native to the Indian state of Maharashtra. Abhyankar surname is found among Chitpavan Brahmin community.

== Etymology ==
Abhyankar is a Sanskrit word which means One who removes fears.

== Notable people ==
Notable people with the surname include:

- Anand Abhyankar (1963–2012), Indian film, television and theatre actor
- Anupama Gokhale (born Anupama Abhyankar in 1969), Indian chess player
- Moreshwar Vasudeo Abhyankar (1886–1935), Indian lawyer and freedom fighter
- Sai Abhyankkar (born 2004), Indian composer, playback singer and music producer
- Sanjeev Abhyankar (born 1969), Indian classical vocalist
- Shreeram Shankar Abhyankar (1930–2012), Indian-American mathematician
  - Abhyankar's conjecture
  - Abhyankar's inequality
  - Abhyankar's lemma
  - Abhyankar–Moh theorem

== See also ==
- Joshi-Abhyankar serial murders
