= Noncommutative algebraic geometry =

Branch of mathematics

Noncommutative algebraic geometry is a branch of mathematics, and more specifically a direction in noncommutative geometry, that studies the geometric properties of formal duals of non-commutative algebraic objects such as rings as well as geometric objects derived from them (e.g. by gluing along localizations or taking noncommutative stack quotients).

For example, noncommutative algebraic geometry is supposed to extend a notion of an algebraic scheme by suitable gluing of spectra of noncommutative rings; depending on how literally and how generally this aim (and a notion of spectrum) is understood in noncommutative setting, this has been achieved in various level of success. The noncommutative ring generalizes here a commutative ring of regular functions on a commutative scheme. Functions on usual spaces in the traditional (commutative) algebraic geometry have a product defined by pointwise multiplication; as the values of these functions commute, the functions also commute: a times b equals b times a. It is remarkable that viewing noncommutative associative algebras as algebras of functions on "noncommutative" would-be space is a far-reaching geometric intuition, though it formally looks like a fallacy.

Much of the motivation for noncommutative geometry, and in particular for the noncommutative algebraic geometry, is from physics; especially from quantum physics, where the algebras of observables are indeed viewed as noncommutative analogues of functions, hence having the ability to observe their geometric aspects is desirable.

One of the values of the field is that it also provides new techniques to study objects in commutative algebraic geometry such as Brauer groups.

The methods of noncommutative algebraic geometry are analogs of the methods of commutative algebraic geometry, but frequently the foundations are different. Local behavior in commutative algebraic geometry is captured by commutative algebra and especially the study of local rings. These do not have a ring-theoretic analogue in the noncommutative setting; though in a categorical setup one can talk about stacks of local categories of quasicoherent sheaves over noncommutative spectra. Global properties such as those arising from homological algebra and K-theory more frequently carry over to the noncommutative setting.

== History ==
=== Classical approach: the issue of non-commutative localization ===
Commutative algebraic geometry begins by constructing the spectrum of a ring. The points of the algebraic variety (or more generally, scheme) are the prime ideals of the ring, and the functions on the algebraic variety are the elements of the ring. A noncommutative ring, however, may not have any proper non-zero two-sided prime ideals. For instance, this is true of the Weyl algebra of polynomial differential operators on affine space: The Weyl algebra is a simple ring. Therefore, one can for instance attempt to replace a prime spectrum by a primitive spectrum: there are also the theory of non-commutative localization as well as descent theory. This works to some extent: for instance, Dixmier's enveloping algebras may be thought of as working out non-commutative algebraic geometry for the primitive spectrum of an enveloping algebra of a Lie algebra. Another work in a similar spirit is Michael Artin’s notes titled “noncommutative rings”, which in part is an attempt to study representation theory from a non-commutative-geometry point of view. The key insight to both approaches is that irreducible representations, or at least primitive ideals, can be thought of as “non-commutative points”.

=== Modern viewpoint using categories of sheaves ===
As it turned out, starting from, say, primitive spectra, it was not easy to develop a workable sheaf theory. One might imagine this difficulty is because of a sort of quantum phenomenon: points in a space can influence points far away (and in fact, it is not appropriate to treat points individually and view a space as a mere collection of the points).

Due to the above, one accepts a paradigm implicit in Pierre Gabriel's thesis and partly justified by the Gabriel–Rosenberg reconstruction theorem (after Pierre Gabriel and Alexander L. Rosenberg) that a commutative scheme can be reconstructed, up to isomorphism of schemes, solely from the abelian category of quasicoherent sheaves on the scheme. Alexander Grothendieck taught that to do geometry one does not need a space, it is enough to have a category of sheaves on that would-be space; this idea has been transmitted to noncommutative algebra by Yuri Manin. There are, a bit weaker, reconstruction theorems from the derived categories of (quasi)coherent sheaves motivating the derived noncommutative algebraic geometry (see just below).

=== Derived algebraic geometry ===
Perhaps the most recent approach is through the deformation theory, placing non-commutative algebraic geometry in the realm of derived algebraic geometry.

As a motivating example, consider the one-dimensional Weyl algebra over the complex numbers C. This is the quotient of the free ring C<x, y> by the relation

xy - yx = 1.

This ring represents the polynomial differential operators in a single variable x; y stands in for the differential operator ∂_{x}. This ring fits into a one-parameter family given by the relations xy - yx = α. When α is not zero, then this relation determines a ring isomorphic to the Weyl algebra. When α is zero, however, the relation is the commutativity relation for x and y, and the resulting quotient ring is the polynomial ring in two variables, C[x, y]. Geometrically, the polynomial ring in two variables represents the two-dimensional affine space A^{2}, so the existence of this one-parameter family says that affine space admits non-commutative deformations to the space determined by the Weyl algebra. This deformation is related to the symbol of a differential operator and that A^{2} is the cotangent bundle of the affine line. (Studying the Weyl algebra can lead to information about affine space: The Dixmier conjecture about the Weyl algebra is equivalent to the Jacobian conjecture about affine space.)

In this line of the approach, the notion of operad, a set or space of operations, becomes prominent: in the introduction to (Francis 2008), Francis writes:

We begin the study of certain less commutative algebraic geometries. … algebraic geometry over $\mathcal{E}_n$-rings can be thought of as interpolating between some derived theories of noncommutative and commutative algebraic geometries. As n increases, these $\mathcal{E}_n$-algebras converge to the derived algebraic geometry of Toën-Vezzosi and Lurie.

== Proj of a noncommutative ring ==
One of the basic constructions in commutative algebraic geometry is the Proj construction of a graded commutative ring. This construction builds a projective algebraic variety together with a very ample line bundle whose homogeneous coordinate ring is the original ring. Building the underlying topological space of the variety requires localizing the ring, but building sheaves on that space does not. By a theorem of Jean-Pierre Serre, quasi-coherent sheaves on Proj of a graded ring are the same as graded modules over the ring up to finite dimensional factors. The philosophy of topos theory promoted by Alexander Grothendieck says that the category of sheaves on a space can serve as the space itself. Consequently, in non-commutative algebraic geometry one often defines Proj in the following fashion: Let R be a graded C-algebra, and let Mod-R denote the category of graded right R-modules. Let F denote the subcategory of Mod-R consisting of all modules of finite length. Proj R is defined to be the quotient of the abelian category Mod-R by F. Equivalently, it is a localization of Mod-R in which two modules become isomorphic if, after taking their direct sums with appropriately chosen objects of F, they are isomorphic in Mod-R.

This approach leads to a theory of non-commutative projective geometry. A non-commutative smooth projective curve turns out to be a smooth commutative curve, but for singular curves or smooth higher-dimensional spaces, the non-commutative setting allows new objects.

== See also ==
- Q-category
- quasi-free algebra
