= Ludwig Kraus =

Czech mathematician (1857–1886)

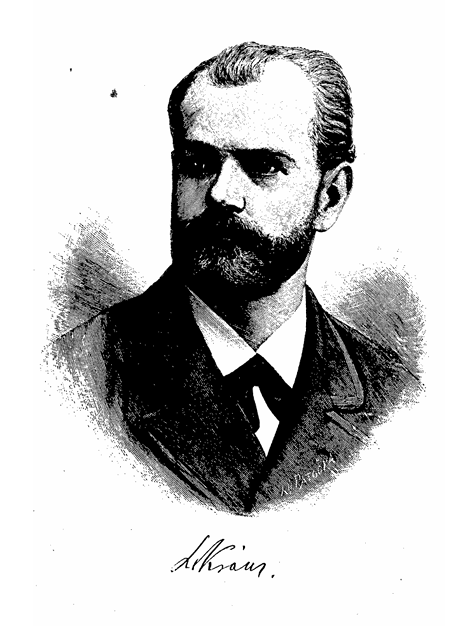
- Born: Ludvík Kraus; 9 April 1857; Turnov, Bohemia, Austrian Empire
- Died: 1886 (aged 28–29)
- Years active: 1880–1884
- Known for: Jacobian conjecture

Academic background
- Education: University of Prague (PhD)

Ludwig Kraus (Czech: Ludvík Kraus; 9 April 1857 – 1886) was a Czech mathematician. In 1884, he published a paper giving a partial proof of the result now known as the two-variable case of the Jacobian conjecture more than half a century before Ott-Heinrich Keller proposed the conjecture in its general form in 1939. Kraus's priority went unrecognized until 2026.

== Life ==
Kraus was born in Turnov in Bohemia, then part of the Austrian Empire, on 9 April 1857. He attended Realschulen and the Polytechnic Institute in Vienna, and, after passing the gymnasium matriculation examination, he transferred to university study, receiving a doctorate from the University of Prague in 1878.

He studied under Felix Klein in Munich to deepen his mathematical training and then spent four semesters in Berlin attending the lectures of Karl Weierstrass and Leopold Kronecker. He habilitated at the University of Prague in 1881, and when the university was divided into separate Czech and German institutions in 1882 he joined the Czech university, where he lectured on mathematics for four semesters.

Kraus belonged to the Czech mathematical community centered on the Union of Czech Mathematicians, and, according to his obituarist Eduard Weyr, was an enthusiastic advocate within it of the mathematical rigor associated with Weierstrass.

He died in 1886, aged 28 or 29. His brother Karel Kraus, a manufacturer in Turnov, subsequently donated Kraus's scientific papers to the Union, and Weyr's obituary of him appeared in the Union's journal, Časopis pro pěstování mathematiky a fysiky, later that year.

== Work ==
Kraus's earliest paper, a note on exceptional special groups on algebraic curves, appeared in Mathematische Annalen in 1880 and treated the problem of determining the curves that admit certain special groups of points as their intersections with other algebraic curves. His next two papers, both titled Ueber rational umkehrbare Substitutionen ("On rationally invertible substitutions"), appeared in the proceedings of the Royal Bohemian Society of Sciences in Prague in 1882 and 1883. In them, he investigated pairs of integral rational functions of two variables for which the variables can be recovered from the substituted values as rational functions.

Drawing on his notes from Weierstrass's lectures, Kraus also published expository articles in Časopis pro pěstování mathematiky a fysiky ("On the foundations of arithmetic and of the theory of rational functions") intended as parts of a treatise on the theory of functions that he left unfinished at his death.

His 1884 paper Ueber Functionaldeterminanten ("On functional determinants"), published in the proceedings of the Imperial Academy of Sciences in Vienna, has as its main result the statement now called the plane (two-variable) Jacobian conjecture, namely that a polynomial map of the plane whose Jacobian determinant is a nonzero constant possesses a polynomial inverse. Kraus argued the result using the theory of the resultant and the theory of algebraic functions, but the final step of his proof is flawed. A 2026 study found that the gap, controlling the ramification at infinity, is the same obstacle that continues to block algebro-geometric approaches to the conjecture. Writing in 1886, Weyr had presented the result as a correct and elegant theorem, without noting any difficulty in the proof.

== Legacy ==
Kraus's 1884 paper was overlooked for more than a century, and the conjecture came to be associated with Keller, who stated its general n-dimensional form in 1939. The paper was rediscovered in 2026 by Lázaro Orlando Rodríguez Díaz, following a search of the zbMATH database for the term Functionaldeterminanten.

== Selected publications ==
- Kraus, Ludwig (1880). "Note über aussergewöhnliche Specialgruppen auf algebraischen Curven". Mathematische Annalen (in German). 16: 245–259. doi:10.1007/BF01446388.
- Kraus, Ludwig (1882). "Ueber rational umkehrbare Substitutionen". Sitzungsberichte der Königlichen Böhmischen Gesellschaft der Wissenschaften (in German): 338–352.
- Kraus, Ludwig (1883). "Ueber rational umkehrbare Substitutionen". Sitzungsberichte der Königlichen Böhmischen Gesellschaft der Wissenschaften (in German): 187–196.
- Kraus, Ludwig (1884). "Ueber Functionaldeterminanten". Sitzungsberichte der Kaiserlichen Akademie der Wissenschaften, Wien (in German). 90: 813–826.
- Kraus, Ludwig (1886). "Příspěvek ku transformaci jedenáctého řádu funkcí elliptických" [A contribution to the eleventh-order transformation of elliptic functions]. Časopis pro pěstování mathematiky a fysiky (in Czech). 15 (2): 52–61.
