= Dmitry Faddeev =

Soviet mathematician (1907–1989)

Dmitrii Konstantinovich Faddeev
- Дмитрий Константинович Фаддеев
- Born: June 30, 1907 near Moscow, Russian Empire
- Died: 1989 (aged 81–82)
- Education: Leningrad State University
- Known for: Inverse Galois problem research; Faddeev–Leverrier algorithm; the Khinchin–Faddeev axiomatization of Shannon entropy.[1][2][3]
- Spouse: Vera Faddeeva
- Children: Ludvig Faddeev
- Scientific career
- Fields: Mathematics
- Workplaces: Leningrad State University; Steklov Mathematical Institute

Dmitrii Konstantinovich Faddeev (Russian: Дми́трий Константи́нович Фадде́ев, IPA: [ˈdmʲitrʲɪj kənstɐnʲˈtʲinəvʲɪtɕ fɐˈdʲe(j)ɪf]; 30 June 1907 – 20 October 1989) was a Soviet mathematician known for his work in algebra, number theory, homological algebra, computational mathematics, and mathematics education. He is also recognized for one of the earliest axiomatizations of Shannon entropy in probability theory.

== Biography ==
Faddeev was born on 30 June 1907 about 200 kilometres south-west of Moscow, on his father's estate. His father, Konstantin Tikhonovich Faddeev, was an engineer, and his mother was a physician with a deep interest in music that inspired Dmitrii's lifelong love of the piano. Friends later recalled his musical talent as both expressive and entertaining.

He graduated from Leningrad State University (then Petrograd State University) in 1928, where his teachers included Ivan Matveyevich Vinogradov and Boris Nicolaevich Delone. In the mid-1920s he also studied at the composition department of the Leningrad Conservatory, but did not complete that course. In 1930 he married Vera Nicolaevna Zamyatina (Faddeeva), with whom he later co-authored works in numerical analysis. They had three children, including the mathematical physicist Ludvig Faddeev (Russian: Фаддеев Людвиг Дмитриевич, IPA: [fɐˈdʲe(j)ɪf ˈlʲudvʲɪk dmʲˈitrʲɪjɪvʲɪt͡ɕ]).

From 1934 he worked at the Mathematical Institute of the Academy of Sciences of the USSR, and from 1940 at the Leningrad Branch of the V. A. Steklov Mathematical Institute, where he headed the Laboratory of Algebra. He became a professor at Leningrad State University in 1944 and served as Dean of the Faculty of Mathematics and Mechanics from 1952 to 1954. For many years he chaired the Department of Algebra and later directed the Mathematics Division of the faculty.

== Scientific work ==
Faddeev's research spanned number theory, algebra, homology in groups, and computational mathematics. In algebra, his main focus was the inverse Galois problem — the search for algebraic extensions with a prescribed Galois group over a given field. He also obtained results in homological algebra and in applied mathematics worked on linear-algebraic algorithms, notably the Faddeev-LeVerrier algorithm for computing the adjugate matrix and characteristic polynomial.

In probability theory, he authored an early paper "On the concept of entropy of a finite probabilistic scheme". In this note Faddeev gave a three-axiom characterization of Shannon's entropy based on continuity, symmetry, and recursive additivity. These axioms simplified the earlier system of axioms proposed by Aleksandr Khinchin (1953) and later played a role in information theory.

Together with Vera Faddeeva he wrote Numerical Methods in Linear Algebra (1960; enlarged edition 1963). For instance, they developed an idea of Urbain Leverrier to produce an algorithm to find the resolvent matrix $(A - sI)^{-1}$ of a given matrix A. By iteration, the method computed the adjugate matrix and characteristic polynomial for A. With I. S. Sominsky he co-authored Problems in Higher Algebra, which was translated into several languages.

== Educational work ==
Since the 1930s he organized and conducted school mathematical olympiads and built a strong pedagogical community in Leningrad. He was one of the founders of Boarding School No. 45 for Physics and Mathematics (now the D. K. Faddeev Academic Gymnasium of Saint Petersburg State University). From February 1965 he served as its scientific curator and later as a member of the school council.

== Students ==
Faddeev's students included Mark Bashmakov (ru), Zenon Borevich, Lyudmyla Nazarova, Andrei Roiter, Alexander Skopin, and Anatoly Yakovlev (ru).
