= Plane (mathematics) =

2D surface which extends indefinitely

In mathematics, a plane is a two-dimensional space or flat surface that extends indefinitely. A plane is the two-dimensional analogue of a point (zero dimensions), a line (one dimension) and three-dimensional space. When working exclusively in two-dimensional Euclidean space, the definite article is used, so the Euclidean plane refers to the whole space.

Several notions of a plane may be defined. The Euclidean plane follows Euclidean geometry, and in particular the parallel postulate. A projective plane may be constructed by adding "points at infinity" where two otherwise parallel lines would intersect, so that every pair of lines intersects in exactly one point. The elliptic plane may be further defined by adding a metric to the real projective plane. One may also conceive of a hyperbolic plane, which obeys hyperbolic geometry and has a negative curvature.

Abstractly, one may forget all structure except the topology, producing the topological plane, which is homeomorphic to an open disk. Viewing the plane as an affine space produces the affine plane, which lacks a notion of distance but preserves the notion of collinearity. Conversely, in adding more structure, one may view the plane as a 1-dimensional complex manifold, called the complex line.

Many fundamental tasks in mathematics, geometry, trigonometry, graph theory, and graphing are performed in a two-dimensional or planar space.

== Euclidean plane ==
Bi-dimensional Cartesian coordinate system

In mathematics, a Euclidean plane is a Euclidean space of dimension two, denoted $\textbf{E}^2$ or $\mathbb{E}^2$. It is a geometric space in which two real numbers are required to determine the position of each point. It is an affine space, which includes in particular the concept of parallel lines. It has also metrical properties induced by a distance, which allows to define circles, and angle measurement.

A Euclidean plane with a chosen Cartesian coordinate system is called a Cartesian plane. The set $\mathbb{R}^2$ of the ordered pairs of real numbers (the real coordinate plane), equipped with the dot product, is often called the Euclidean plane or standard Euclidean plane, since every Euclidean plane is isomorphic to it.

=== Embedding in three-dimensional space ===
Plane equation in normal form

In Euclidean geometry, a plane is a flat two-dimensional surface that extends indefinitely. Euclidean planes often arise as subspaces of three-dimensional space $\mathbb{R}^3$. A prototypical example is one of a room's walls, infinitely extended and assumed infinitesimally thin. While a pair of real numbers $\mathbb{R}^2$ suffices to describe points on a plane, the relationship with out-of-plane points requires special consideration for their embedding in the ambient space $\mathbb{R}^3$.

== Elliptic plane ==
The elliptic plane is the real projective plane provided with a metric. Kepler and Desargues used the gnomonic projection to relate a plane σ to points on a hemisphere tangent to it. With O the center of the hemisphere, a point P in σ determines a line OP intersecting the hemisphere, and any line L ⊂ σ determines a plane OL which intersects the hemisphere in half of a great circle. The hemisphere is bounded by a plane through O and parallel to σ. No ordinary line of σ corresponds to this plane; instead a line at infinity is appended to σ. As any line in this extension of σ corresponds to a plane through O, and since any pair of such planes intersects in a line through O, one can conclude that any pair of lines in the extension intersect: the point of intersection lies where the plane intersection meets σ or the line at infinity. Thus the axiom of projective geometry, requiring all pairs of lines in a plane to intersect, is confirmed.

Given P and Q in σ, the elliptic distance between them is the measure of the angle POQ, usually taken in radians. Arthur Cayley initiated the study of elliptic geometry when he wrote "On the definition of distance". This venture into abstraction in geometry was followed by Felix Klein and Bernhard Riemann leading to non-Euclidean geometry and Riemannian geometry.

== Projective plane ==
Drawings of the finite projective planes of orders 2 (the Fano plane) and 3, in grid layout, showing a method of creating such drawings for prime orders

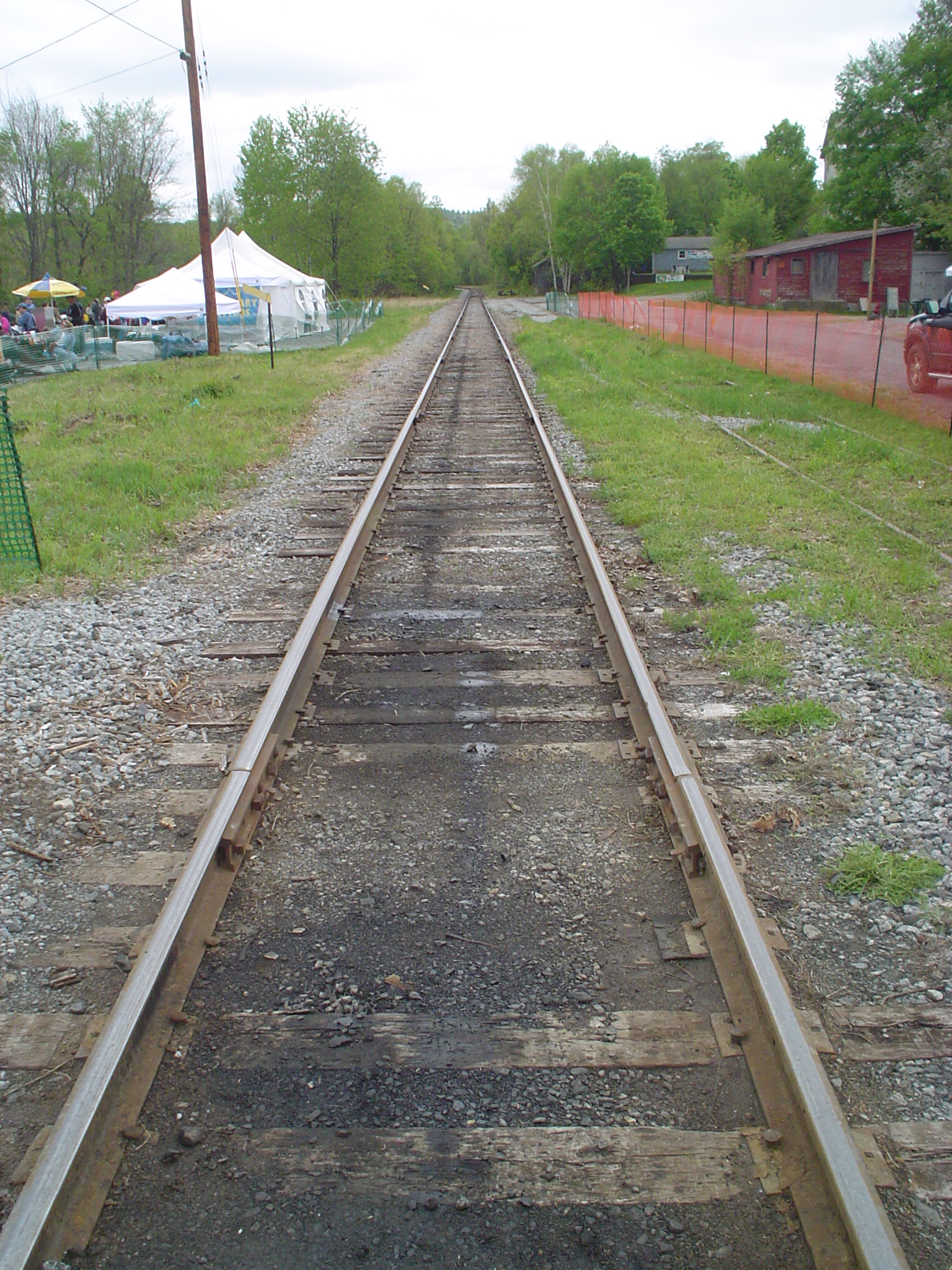
These parallel lines appear to intersect in the vanishing point "at infinity". In a projective plane this is actually true.

In mathematics, a projective plane is a geometric structure that extends the concept of a plane. In the ordinary Euclidean plane, two lines typically intersect at a single point, but there are some pairs of lines (namely, parallel lines) that do not intersect. A projective plane can be thought of as an ordinary plane equipped with additional "points at infinity" where parallel lines intersect. Thus any two distinct lines in a projective plane intersect at exactly one point.

Renaissance artists, in developing the techniques of drawing in perspective, laid the groundwork for this mathematical topic. The archetypical example is the real projective plane, also known as the extended Euclidean plane. This example, in slightly different guises, is important in algebraic geometry, topology and projective geometry where it may be denoted variously by PG(2, R), RP^{2}, or P_{2}(R), among other notations. There are many other projective planes, both infinite, such as the complex projective plane, and finite, such as the Fano plane.

A projective plane is a 2-dimensional projective space. Not all projective planes can be embedded in 3-dimensional projective spaces; such embeddability is a consequence of a property known as Desargues' theorem, not shared by all projective planes.

== Further generalizations ==
In addition to its familiar geometric structure, with isomorphisms that are isometries with respect to the usual inner product, the plane may be viewed at various other levels of abstraction. Each level of abstraction corresponds to a specific category.

At one extreme, all geometrical and metric concepts may be dropped to leave the topological plane, which may be thought of as an idealized homotopically trivial infinite rubber sheet, which retains a notion of proximity, but has no distances. The topological plane has a concept of a linear path, but no concept of a straight line. The topological plane, or its equivalent the open disc, is the basic topological neighborhood used to construct surfaces (or 2-manifolds) classified in low-dimensional topology. Isomorphisms of the topological plane are all continuous bijections. The topological plane is the natural context for the branch of graph theory that deals with planar graphs, and results such as the four color theorem.

The plane may also be viewed as an affine space, whose isomorphisms are combinations of translations and non-singular linear maps. From this viewpoint there are no distances, but collinearity and ratios of distances on any line are preserved.

Differential geometry views a plane as a 2-dimensional real manifold, a topological plane which is provided with a differential structure. Again in this case, there is no notion of distance, but there is now a concept of smoothness of maps, for example a differentiable or smooth path (depending on the type of differential structure applied). The isomorphisms in this case are bijections with the chosen degree of differentiability.

In the opposite direction of abstraction, we may apply a compatible field structure to the geometric plane, giving rise to the complex plane and the major area of complex analysis. The complex field has only two automorphisms that leave the real line fixed, the identity and conjugation.

In the same way as in the real case, the plane may also be viewed as the simplest, one-dimensional (in terms of complex dimension, over the complex numbers) complex manifold, sometimes called the complex line. However, this viewpoint contrasts sharply with the case of the plane as a 2-dimensional real manifold. The isomorphisms are all conformal bijections of the complex plane, but the only possibilities are maps that correspond to the composition of a multiplication by a complex number and a translation.

In addition, the Euclidean geometry (which has zero curvature everywhere) is not the only geometry that the plane may have. The plane may be given a spherical geometry by using the stereographic projection. This can be thought of as placing a sphere tangent to the plane (just like a ball on the floor), removing the top point, and projecting the sphere onto the plane from this point. This is one of the projections that may be used in making a flat map of part of the Earth's surface. The resulting geometry has constant positive curvature.

Alternatively, the plane can also be given a metric which gives it constant negative curvature giving the hyperbolic plane. The latter possibility finds an application in the theory of special relativity in the simplified case where there are two spatial dimensions and one time dimension. (The hyperbolic plane is a timelike hypersurface in three-dimensional Minkowski space.)

== Topological and differential geometric notions ==
The one-point compactification of the plane is homeomorphic to a sphere (see stereographic projection); the open disk is homeomorphic to a sphere with the "north pole" missing; adding that point completes the (compact) sphere. The result of this compactification is a manifold referred to as the Riemann sphere or the complex projective line. The projection from the Euclidean plane to a sphere without a point is a diffeomorphism and even a conformal map.

The plane itself is homeomorphic (and diffeomorphic) to an open disk. For the hyperbolic plane such diffeomorphism is conformal, but for the Euclidean plane it is not.

== See also ==
- Affine plane
- Half-plane
- Hyperbolic geometry
