= Andrei Roiter =

Ukrainian mathematician

Andrei Vladimirovich Roiter (Russian: Андрей Владимирович Ройтер; Ukrainian: Андрій Володимирович Ройтер, November 30, 1937, Dnipro – July 26, 2006, Riga, Latvia) was a Ukrainian mathematician, specializing in algebra.

A. V. Roiter's father was the Ukrainian physical chemist V. A. Roiter, a leading expert on catalysis. In 1955 Andrei V. Roiter matriculated at Taras Shevchenko National University of Kyiv, where he met a fellow mathematics major Lyudmyla Nazarova. In 1958 he and Nazarova transferred to Saint Petersburg State University (then named Leningrad State University). They married and began a lifelong collaboration on representation theory. He received in 1960 his Diploma (M.S.) and in 1963 his Candidate of Sciences degree (PhD). His PhD thesis was supervised by Dmitry Konstantinovich Faddeev, who also supervised Ludmila Nazarova's PhD. A. V. Roiter was hired in 1961 as a researcher at the Institute of Mathematics of the Academy of Sciences of Ukraine, where he worked until his death in 2006 and since 1991 was Head of the Department of Algebra. He received his Doctor of Sciences degree (habilitation) in 1969. In 1978 he was an invited speaker at the International Congress of Mathematicians in Helsinki.

In his first published paper, Roiter in 1960 proved an important result that eventually led several other mathematicians to establish that a finite group $G$ has finitely many non-isomorphic indecomposable integral representations if and only if, for each prime p, its Sylow p-subgroup is cyclic of order at most p^{2}.

In a 1966 paper he proved an important theorem in the theory of the integral representation of rings. In a famous 1968 paper, he proved the first Brauer-Thrall conjecture.

Roiter proved the first Brauer-Thrall conjecture for finite-dimensional algebras; his paper never mentioned Artin algebras, but his techniques work for Artin algebras as well. There is an important line of research inspired by the paper and started by Maurice Auslander and Sverre Olaf Smalø in a 1980 paper. Auslander and Smalø's paper and its follow-ups by several researchers introduced, among other things, covariantly and contravariantly finite subcategories of the category of finitely generated modules over an Artin algebra, which led to the theory of almost split sequences in subcategories.

According to Auslander and Smalø:

... it is perhaps surprising that the original impetus for our work did not come from the theory of hereditary artin algebras or those stably equivalent to hereditary artin algebras. Rather, the research came from an effort to explain a much older result of Gabriel and Roiter ... concerning artin algebras of finite representation type in terms of the technics and ideas developed by Auslander and Reiten in connection with almost split sequences and irreducible morphisms ...

Roiter did important research on p-adic representations, especially his 1967 paper with Yuriy Drozd and Vladimir V. Kirichenko on hereditary and Bass orders and the Drozd-Roiter criterion for a commutative order to have finitely many non-isomorphic indecomposable representations. An important tool in this research was his theory of divisibility of modules.

In 1972 Nazarova and Roiter introduced representations of partially ordered sets, an important class of matrix problems with many applications in mathematics, such as the representation theory of finite-dimensional algebras. (In 2005 they with M. N. Smirnova proved a theorem about antimonotone quadratic forms and partially ordered sets.) Also in the 1970s Roiter in three papers, two of which were joint work with Mark Kleiner, introduced representations of bocses, a very large class of matrix problems.

The monograph by Roiter and P. Gabriel (with a contribution by Bernhard Keller), published by Springer in 1992 in English translation, is important for its influence on the theory of representations of finite-dimensional algebras and the theory of matrix problems. There is a 1997 reprint of the English translation.

In the years shortly before his death, Roiter did research on representations in Hilbert spaces. In two papers, he with his wife and Stanislav A. Kruglyak introduced the notion of locally scalar representations of quivers (i.e. directed multigraphs) in Hilbert spaces. In their 2006 paper they constructed for such representations Coxeter functors analogous to Bernstein-Gelfand-Ponomarev functors and applied the new functors to the study of locally scalar representations. In particular, they proved that a graph has only finitely many indecomposable locally scalar representations (up to unitary isomorphism) if and only if it is a Dynkin graph. Their result is analogous to that of Gabriel for the “usual” representations of quivers.

In 1961 Roiter started in Kyiv a seminar on the theory of representations. The seminar became the foundation of the highly esteemed Kyiv school of the representation theory. He was the supervisor for 13 Candidate of Sciences degrees (PhDs). In 2007 A. V. Roiter was posthumously awarded the State Prize of Ukraine in Science and Technology for his research on representation theory.
