= Pierre Gabriel =

French mathematician (1933–2015)

- Born: 1 August 1933; Bitche, Lorraine, France
- Died: 24 November 2015 (aged 82); St. Gallen
- Education: University of Paris
- Known for: Gabriel's theorem Gabriel quotient Gabriel–Zisman localization Gabriel–Rosenberg reconstruction theorem Gabriel–Popescu embedding theorem
- Awards: Prix Francoeur (1972); ICM Plenary Speaker (1986)
- Scientific career
- Fields: Mathematics
- Workplaces: University of Zurich; University of Bonn; University of Strasbourg
- Thesis: Des catégories abéliennes (1961)
- Doctoral advisor: Jean-Pierre Serre
- Doctoral students: Bernhard Keller; Christine Riedtmann

Pierre Gabriel (1 August 1933 – 24 November 2015), also known as Peter Gabriel, was a French mathematician who worked as a professor at the University of Strasbourg (1962–1970), University of Bonn (1970–1974) and University of Zürich (1974–1998). He was an algebraist with fundamental contributions to homological algebra, the theory of abelian categories, algebraic groups and the representation theory of algebras.

== Life and work ==
Gabriel was born in the French town of Bitche in Lorraine, near the German border, a region that historically had been contested between France and Germany. Gabriel was bilingual and variantly used the first names Pierre and Peter in his publications. Throughout his life, he would forcefully argue for bilingualism and was active in several organizations supporting this goal.

From 1953 to 1957 he studied mathematics at the prestigious École normale supérieure Paris and afterwards became a research fellow at CNRS from 1957 to 1960. Mathematically, he was heavily influenced by Henri Cartan, Alexandre Grothendieck and Jean-Pierre Serre, who all worked in Paris at the time.

His doctoral thesis, written at the Sorbonne under the direction of Serre, was defended in 1960 and published in 1962. It contained important work about abelian categories, a concept introduced by Buchsbaum and popularized by Grothendieck a few years earlier. In his thesis, Gabriel studied the proper concept of localization of abelian categories, known as the Serre quotient or Gabriel quotient. With Michel Zisman he later proposed a more generally applicable concept of localization of categories and applied it to homotopy theory, thereby axiomatizing simplicial homotopy theory. The thesis also contains an early "reconstruction theorem" allowing (under certain assumptions) to reconstruct a scheme X from the abelian category of quasi-coherent sheaves on X, by considering the spectrum of indecomposable injective objects in the category. This theorem, later vastly generalized by Alexander L. Rosenberg and now known as the Gabriel-Rosenberg reconstruction theorem, forms a starting point for non-commutative algebraic geometry.

In the early 1960s, Grothendieck and Gabriel collaborated in compiling the volumes SGA 1 and SGA 3. In particular, they established the Grothendieck construction.

Gabriel collaborated with Nicolae Popescu in the study of abelian categories. In 1964 they published the Gabriel-Popescu theorem, showing that every Grothendieck category is a Serre quotient of the category of all (right) modules over some (not necessarily commutative) unital ring.

With Michel Demazure he published a volume on algebraic groups in 1970, emphasizing homological methods and algebraic geometry in the style of Grothendieck. An English translation of the first two chapters of the book appeared in 1980.

In 1972 Gabriel published a fundamental result in representation theory, now known as Gabriel's theorem. He gives a complete list of those quivers that admit (up to isomorphism) only finitely many indecomposable linear representations over a given field and furthermore describes those representations. His proof uses root systems and the Weyl group.

Another important result in the representation theory of finite-dimensional algebras, a collaborative effort of Gabriel, Andrei Roiter, Raymundo Bautista and Leonardo Salmerón, appeared in 1985. Extending an earlier result by Gabriel's former doctoral student Klaus Bongartz, it established the existence of multiplicative bases for algebras of finite representation type (i.e. those associative algebras over a field admitting only finitely many isomorphism types of indecomposable modules).

Having relocated to Switzerland in 1974, he served as the president of the Swiss Mathematical Society in 1980–1981.

Gabriel and Bongartz wrote about covering spaces in representation theory in 1982, building on earlier work by Gabriel's former doctoral student Christine Riedtmann. This led to effective algorithms for algebras of finite representation type.

Gabriel, his former doctoral student Bernhard Keller and A. V. Roiter published a book on the representation theory of finite-dimensional algebras in 1997.

== Awards and recognition ==
He was awarded the Prix Francoeur in 1972. In 1986 he was a plenary speaker at the ICM 1986 in Berkeley, explaining his work in finite-dimensional representation theory. He was elected a correspondent member of the French Academy of Sciences in November 1986.
