= Skopin =

Skopin may refer to:

- Skopin, Russia, a town in Ryazan Oblast
- Skopin (surname), a Russian surname (includes a list of people with the name)
