= D. K. Faddeev Academic Gymnasium =

Dmitry Konstantinovich Faddeev Academic Gymnasium at Saint Petersburg State University (Russian: Академическая гимназия имени Д. К. Фаддеева Санкт-Петербургского государственного университета), also known as the 45th Physics Mathematics School (Russian: 45-ая Физико-математическая школа), is a selective secondary boarding school at the Saint Petersburg State University established in 1963 in what was then the Soviet Union, now Russia. In 2015 it was named after Russian mathematician Dmitry Konstantinovich Faddeev, who was one of the founders of the school.

== History ==
=== Boarding School No. 45 ===
The boarding school with physics-mathematics and chemistry-biology specialization was organized by the decree of Council of Ministers of the Soviet Union No. 905 (23 August 1963) "on organization of specialized boarding schools with the physics-mathematics and chemistry-biology profiles" The decree was initiated by a letter signed by a few Soviet politicians and scientists including the Minister for the Defense Industry Sergei Alekseevich Zverev, president of the Soviet Academy of Sciences Mstislav Keldysh, Soviet mathematician Ivan Petrovsky and Soviet physicist Isaak Kikoin.

Works on establishing of a physics-mathematics boarding school at Leningrad State University started before signing of the Council of Ministers Decree in 1963 spring. 120 students were recruited and sent to four classes. The plans were to use Boarding School No 7 on Vasilyevsky Island.

After signing of the decree the plans were expanded and included establishing of an independent boarding school. The champions for organization of the new school was mathematician Mark Bashmakov at the time the leader of komsomol organization of the Leningrad State University, and the rector of the University, mathematician Aleksandr Danilovich Aleksandrov

The new boarding school used building of a disestablished boarding school No 45 of Zhdanovsky District, Leningrad. The office supplies inherited from that school determined the unofficial name of the new school: Physics-Mathematics School No 45 or PhMSh 45.

The entrance exams to the new school were organized in the fall 1963. 183 gifted children of Arkhangelsk, Vologda, Pskov, Novgorod, Murmansk and Leningrad regions were admitted into the 9th and 10th grades of the school. The first classes were held on 16 October 1963, that day is celebrated as the birthday of the school.

=== Academic Gymnasium ===
On 25 January 1991 the school was renamed Academic Gymnasium and included as a department of Saint Petersburg State University. On 8 March 2015 the school was named after D. K. Faddeev.

According to the 2017 rating by Russian Department of Education "Top 500 School" the school is 12th in Russia and second in Saint Petersburg (after Saint Petersburg Lyceum 239)

At the present time there are about 500 pupils are studying in the school.
