= Abhyankar–Moh theorem =

Theorem in algebraic geometry

In mathematics, the Abhyankar–Moh theorem states that if $L$ is a complex line in the complex affine plane $\mathbb{C}^2$, then every embedding of $L$ into $\mathbb{C}^2$ extends to an automorphism of the plane. It is named after Shreeram Shankar Abhyankar and Tzuong-Tsieng Moh, who published it in 1975. More generally, the same theorem applies to lines and planes over any algebraically closed field of characteristic zero, and to certain well-behaved subsets of higher-dimensional complex affine spaces.

== See also ==
- Jacobian conjecture
