= Gabriel's theorem =

Classifies quivers of finite type in terms of Dynkin diagrams

In mathematics, Gabriel's theorem, proved by Pierre Gabriel, classifies the quivers of finite type in terms of Dynkin diagrams.

== Statement ==
A quiver is of finite type if it has only finitely many isomorphism classes of indecomposable representations. Gabriel (1972) classified all quivers of finite type, and also their indecomposable representations. More precisely, Gabriel's theorem states that:

1. A (connected) quiver is of finite type if and only if its underlying graph (when the directions of the arrows are ignored) is one of the ADE Dynkin diagrams: $A_n$, $D_n$, $E_6$, $E_7$, $E_8$.
2. The indecomposable representations are in a one-to-one correspondence with the positive roots of the root system of the Dynkin diagram. Specifically, each positive root is a positive combination of simple roots, and the coefficients of its expansion match the dimensions of the vector spaces that the indecomposable has at the vertices of the quiver (those vertices being in correspondence with the simple roots).

== Generalizations and extensions ==
Dlab & Ringel (1973) found a generalization of Gabriel's theorem in which all Dynkin diagrams of finite-dimensional semisimple Lie algebras occur. Victor Kac (Kac (1983)) extended these results to all quivers, not only of Dynkin type, relating their indecomposable representations to the roots of Kac–Moody algebras.
