= Christine Riedtmann =

Swiss mathematician

Christine Riedtmann (born 1952) is a Swiss mathematician specializing in abstract algebra. She earned her PhD in 1978 from the University of Zurich under the supervision of Pierre Gabriel, and is a professor emeritus (since 2016) at the University of Bern.

In 2012–2013 she was president of the Swiss Mathematical Society.

== Selected publications ==
- Gabriel, P.; Riedtmann, Ch. (1979), "Group representations without groups", Commentarii Mathematici Helvetici, 54 (2): 240–287, doi:10.1007/BF02566271, MR 0535058, S2CID 120707173
- Riedtmann, Christine (1980), "Representation-finite selfinjective algebras of class A_{n}", Representation theory, II (Proc. Second Internat. Conf., Carleton Univ., Ottawa, Ont., 1979), Lecture Notes in Mathematics, vol. 832, Berlin: Springer, pp. 449–520, doi:10.1007/BFb0088479, ISBN 978-3-540-10264-9, MR 0607169
- Riedtmann, C. (1980), "Algebren, Darstellungsköcher, Überlagerungen und zurück", Commentarii Mathematici Helvetici (in German), 55 (2): 199–224, doi:10.1007/BF02566682, MR 0576602, S2CID 125072194
- Reiten, Idun; Riedtmann, Christine (1985), "Skew group algebras in the representation theory of Artin algebras", Journal of Algebra, 92 (1): 224–282, doi:10.1016/0021-8693(85)90156-5, MR 0772481
