= Gabriel–Rosenberg reconstruction theorem =

In algebraic geometry, the Gabriel–Rosenberg reconstruction theorem, introduced in Gabriel (1962), states that a quasi-separated scheme can be recovered from the category of quasi-coherent sheaves on it. The theorem is taken as a starting point for noncommutative algebraic geometry as the theorem says (in a sense) working with stuff on a space is equivalent to working with the space itself. It is named after Pierre Gabriel and Alexander L. Rosenberg.

== See also ==
- Tannakian duality
