= Skopin (surname) =

Skopin (masculine, Russian: Скопин) or Skopina (feminine, Russian: Скопина) is a Russian surname. Notable people with the surname include:

- Alexander Skopin (1927–2003), Russian mathematician
- Mikhail Skopin-Shuisky (1586–1610), Russian statesman and military figure
- Timofey Skopin (born 1989), Russian speed skater
