= Vera Faddeeva =

Russian mathematician

- Вера Николаевна Фаддеева
- Born: Vera Nikolaevna Zamyatin; 20 September 1906; Tambov, Russian Empire
- Died: 15 April 1983 (aged 76); Leningrad, RSFSR, USSR
- Occupation: mathematician
- Years active: 1930–1980
- Known for: Faddeeva function
- Spouse: Dmitry Konstantinovich Faddeev
- Children: 3

Vera Faddeeva (Russian: Вера Николаевна Фаддеева; Vera Nikolaevna Faddeeva; 1906–1983) was a Soviet mathematician. Faddeeva published some of the earliest work in the field of numerical linear algebra. Her 1950 work, Computational methods of linear algebra was widely acclaimed and she won a USSR State Prize for it. Between 1962 and 1975, she wrote many research papers with her husband, Dmitry Konstantinovich Faddeev. She is remembered as an important Russian mathematician, specializing in linear algebra, who worked in the 20th century.

== Biography ==
Vera Nikolaevna Zamyatina (Russian: Вера Николаевна Замятина) was born 20 September 1906 in Tambov, Russia, to Nikolai Zamyatin. She began her higher education in 1927 at the Leningrad State Pedagogical Institute and then transferred in 1928 to Leningrad State University. She graduated in 1930, married Dmitrii Konstantinovich Faddeev, a fellow mathematician, and began work at the Leningrad Board of Weights and Measures, all in the same year. Between 1930 and 1934, she worked at the Leningrad Hydraulic Engineering Institute and simultaneously between 1933 and 1934 served as a junior researcher at the Seismology Institute of the USSR Academy of Sciences. Beginning in 1935, she conducted research under Boris Grigorievich Galerkin at the Leningrad Institute of Constructions for three years. She returned to the Pedagogical Institute to complete her graduate work in 1938, studying for the next three years. In 1942 Faddeeva was appointed as a junior researcher at the Steklov Institute of Mathematics in Leningrad, but had to flee the city during the German invasion. She lived in Kazan with her family until the siege was over in 1944 and they were able to secure permits as academics to return. By 1946, she had completed her thesis entitled On One Problem and submitted it to the Department of Mathematical Physics of Leningrad State University. The thesis was accepted and she received the equivalent of a PhD in 1946.

In 1949 she published two papers: The method of lines applied to some boundary problems and On fundamental functions of the operator X{IV}. The following year, she published a book with a colleague, Mark Konstantinovich Gavurin, which was a series of Bessel function tables and her most famous work, Computational methods of linear algebra, which was one of the first of its kind in the field. (Note: Ladyzhenskaya states that the book was the "first of its kind in this field", but Brezinski & Tournès state she presented the square root method in her book but “attributed it to Banachievwicz”. It is clear that hers was not the first work in the field, but it is unclear if she was the first to publish the information.) The book described linear algebra, gave methods for solving linear equations and the inversion of matrices, and explained computing square roots and eigenvalues and eigenvectors of a matrix. Faddeeva had continued working at the Steklov Institute, she would work there until her retirement, and in 1951, became head of the Laboratory of Numerical Computations. This unit was based on a model unit set up at Leningrad State University by Gavurin with Leonid Vitalyevich Kantorovich in 1948. Computational methods was translated into English in 1959 and was widely influential. In 1960, the book was expanded and reprinted in Russian, she was awarded a USSR State Prize, and it also was translated into English, being published in 1963. Between 1962 and 1974, she worked with her husband compiling a summary of developments being made in linear algebra, which were published in 1975. Faddeeva's last paper, prepared in 1980 for a conference in Warsaw was entitled Numerical methods of linear algebra in computer formulation and was published posthumously in 1984.

Faddeeva died 15 April 1983 in Leningrad, Russia.

== Personal ==
Vera Nikolaevna Zamyatina married Dmitry Konstantinovich Faddeev in 1930. Children: Maria (b. 6 October 1931), a chemist; Ludvig (10 March 1934 – 26 February 2017), a mathematician and theoretical physicist; and Michael (28 June 1937 – 30 September 1992), a mathematician.

== Selected works ==
- Faddeeva, Vera Nikolaevna; Benster, Curtis D. (1959). Computational methods of linear algebra. Mineola, New York: Dover Publications. (original Russian published in 1950)
- Faddeeva, V. N. (1968). Numerical Methods and Inequalities in Function Spaces. Providence, Rhode Island: American Mathematical Society. (original Russian published in 1965)
- Faddeeva, V. N. (1970). Automatic Programming, Numerical Methods and Functional Analysis. Providence, Rhode Island: American Mathematical Society. ISBN 978-0-8218-1896-1.
- Faddeeva, Vera Nikolaevna; Matematicheskiĭ institut im. V.A. Steklova (1972). Automatic programming and numerical methods of analysis. New York, New York: Consultants Bureau. ISBN 9780306188183.

== Bibliography ==
- Brezinski, Claude; Tournès, Dominique (2014). André-Louis Cholesky: Mathematician, Topographer and Army Officer. Switzerland: Springer. ISBN 978-3-319-08135-9.
- Brezinski, C.; Wuytack, L. (2012). Numerical Analysis: Historical Developments in the 20th Century. Amsterdam: Elsevier Science. ISBN 978-0-444-59858-5.
- Ladyzhenskaya, O. A., ed. (1994). Proceedings of the St. Petersburg Mathematical Society. 2 Translations. Vol. 159. Translation editor Simeon Ivanov. Providence, Rhode Island: American Mathematical Society. ISBN 978-0-8218-9593-1.
