= Lyudmyla Nazarova =

Ukrainian mathematician

Lyudmyla Oleksandrivna Nazarova (Ukrainian: Людмила Олександрівна Назарова, published as L. A. Nazarova and also spelled Liudmila, Ludmila, or Lyudmila; born 14 May 1938 in Vologda, RSFSR) is a Ukrainian mathematician specializing in linear algebra and representation theory.

== Research ==
With her husband, Andrei Vladimirovich Roiter, Nazarova founded the theory of representations of and differentiation of partially ordered sets,^{[A]} and solved the second Brauer–Thrall conjecture, proving what became known as the Nazarova–Roiter theorem.^{[B]} Her research has also included pioneering work on representations of quivers,^{[C]} and on the wild problem in matrix classification.^{[D]}

== Education and career ==
Lyudmila Nazarova was born in a family of mathematician Olxander Nazarov. Nazarova began her studies at Taras Shevchenko National University of Kyiv, where she met Roiter. Together they transferred to Leningrad State University, where Nazarova completed her doctorate as a student of Dmitry Faddeev. They returned to Kiev, and Nazarova became a researcher in the Institute of Mathematics of the Academy of Sciences of Ukraine, now the National Academy of Sciences of Ukraine. She has since retired.

== Selected publications ==
A.	Nazarova, L. A.; Roĭter, A. V. (1972), "Representations of partially ordered sets", Zapiski Naučnyh Seminarov Leningradskogo Otdelenija Matematičeskogo Instituta im V. A. Steklova Akademii Nauk SSSR, 28: 5–31, MR 0340121

B.	Nazarova, L. A.; Roĭter, A. V. (1973), Kategornye matrichnye zadachi i problema Brauèra-Trèlla [Categorial matrix problems, and the Brauer-Thrall problem], Kiev: Izdat. Naukova Dumka, MR 0412233

C.	Nazarova, L. A. (1973), "Representations of quivers of infinite type", Izvestiya Akademii Nauk SSSR. Seriya Matematicheskaya, 37 (4): 752–791, Bibcode:1973IzMat...7..749N, doi:10.1070/IM1973v007n04ABEH001975, MR 0338018

D.	Nazarova, L. A. (1974), "Representations of partially ordered sets of infinite type", Funkcional'nyi Analiz i ego Priloženija, 8 (4): 93–94, MR 0354455
