= Q-category =

Concept in mathematical category theory

In mathematics, a Q-category or almost quotient category is a category that is a "milder version of a Grothendieck site." A Q-category is a coreflective subcategory. The Q stands for a quotient.

The concept of Q-categories was introduced by Alexander Rosenberg in 1988. The motivation for the notion was its use in noncommutative algebraic geometry; in this formalism, noncommutative spaces are defined as sheaves on Q-categories.

== Definition ==
A Q-category is defined by the formula
$$\mathbb{A} : (u^* \dashv u_*) :  \bar A \stackrel{\overset{u^*}{\leftarrow}}{\underset{u_*}{\to}} A$$
where $u^*$ is the left adjoint in a pair of adjoint functors and is a full and faithful functor.

== Examples ==
- The category of presheaves over any Q-category is itself a Q-category.
- For any category, one can define the Q-category of cones.
- There is a Q-category of sieves.
