= Jacobian conjecture =

About polynomials in several variables

Planar Jacobian conjecture
- Field: Algebraic geometry
- Conjectured by: Ludwig Kraus
- Conjectured in: 1884
- Open problem: Yes

Jacobian conjecture
- Field: Algebraic geometry
- Conjectured by: Ott-Heinrich Keller
- Conjectured in: 1939
- Open problem: Only for n = 2 (planar Jacobian conjecture)
- Known cases: Counterexample found by Levent Alpöge in 2026 for all n > 2
- Equivalent to: Dixmier conjecture

Separable Jacobian conjecture
- Field: Algebraic geometry
- Conjectured by: Kossivi Adjamagbo
- Conjectured in: 1995
- Open problem: Only for characteristic zero, n = 2 (planar Jacobian conjecture)
- Known cases: Counterexamples found for all positive characteristic $p$ in dimensions $n \geq 2$.

In mathematics, the Jacobian conjecture is a conjecture concerning polynomials in several variables that states that if a polynomial function from an $n$-dimensional space to itself has a Jacobian determinant that is a non-zero constant, then the function has a polynomial inverse.

The case $n = 2$ (two variables), also called the plane Jacobian conjecture or planar Jacobian conjecture, is the only case that remains unresolved as of 2026. The case $n = 1$ is trivially true, since the derivative of a polynomial is a nonzero constant only if the degree of the polynomial is $1,$ and linear polynomial functions are invertible.

On July 19, 2026, Levent Alpöge presented an explicit counterexample in three variables which he credited to the large language model Claude Fable 5, disproving the conjecture for $n > 2$. The correctness of the counterexample is easy to verify with any computer algebra system. It has not been revealed, however, how it was found. Nevertheless, it led some mathematicians to elaborate on the mathematical reasons and the implications of the existence of the counterexample.

For fields of positive characteristic, the usual Jacobian conjecture is false in one dimension, so the separable Jacobian conjecture, also called Adjamagbo's Jacobian conjecture, adds a separability premise to make the conjecture true in one dimension. The separable Jacobian conjecture has been proven false for all fields of positive characteristic in all dimensions $n \geq 2$, with the separable Jacobian conjecture for fields of characteristic zero coinciding with the usual Jacobian conjecture.

== History ==
The Jacobian conjecture was originally formulated without being named in two dimensions by Ludwig Kraus in 1884, who gave a flawed proof in the same paper. Later, the modern version of the Jacobian conjecture in $n$ dimensions was formulated by Ott-Heinrich Keller in 1939 for the case of polynomials with integer coefficients. Arno van den Essen has claimed that Keller only talked about the two-dimensional case; however, Keller in fact did talk about the general $n$-dimensional case. For nearly a century, Keller was considered to be the first person to formulate the conjecture, until a 2025 search of the zbMATH database revealed that the two-dimensional case had already been stated by Kraus.

The conjecture was unnamed in either of Kraus's or Keller's original papers. It is unclear who coined the name "Jacobian conjecture", but this was because it involves the Jacobian determinant, itself named after the German mathematician Carl Gustav Jacob Jacobi. The earliest known published use of the name occurs in Masayoshi Miyanishi's 1973 paper, where it refers to the $n$-dimensional conjecture. Tzuong-Tsieng Moh later recalled that, after Oscar Zariski pointed out at a seminar at Purdue University in the late 1960s that the assertion remained unproved, "we decided to call it the Jacobian Conjecture". Alexander Borisov later attributed the coinage specifically to Shreeram Abhyankar, whose 1977 lecture notes treated the two-dimensional problem and presented results that he had obtained in 1970–71.

The conjecture, also called Jacobian problem, was subsequently widely publicized by Abhyankar as an example of a difficult question in algebraic geometry that can be understood using little beyond a knowledge of calculus. The Jacobian conjecture is number 16 in Stephen Smale's 1998 list of Mathematical Problems for the Next Century.

According to Alexander Borisov, the conjecture in two dimensions has been especially well studied in the literature on the conjecture. Historically, some mathematicians, such as Shreeram Abhyankar, Tzuong-Tsieng Moh, and Yitang Zhang, have used the term Jacobian conjecture or Jacobian problem to refer to only the conjecture in two dimensions. There have been a large number of false proofs of the conjecture in two dimensions, some of them published. Arno van den Essen in 1997, Tzuong-Tsieng Moh in 1998, and Edward Formanek in 2011 all hypothesized that the conjecture could be true in two dimensions and false in the general case. After the counterexample in three dimensions was discovered in 2026, only the conjecture in two dimensions remains open.

== Formulation of the conjecture ==
Let $n \geq 1$ be a fixed integer and consider polynomials $f_1, \dots, f_n$ in variables $X_1, \dots, X_n$ with coefficients in a field $\mathbb{K}$. Then we define a vector-valued function $F : \mathbb{K}^n \to \mathbb{K}^n$ by setting:
$$F(X_1, \dots, X_n) = ( f_1(X_1, \dots, X_n), \dots, f_n(X_1,\dots, X_n))$$

Any map $F : \mathbb{K}^n \to \mathbb{K}^n$ arising in this way is called a polynomial mapping.

The Jacobian determinant of $F$, denoted by $J_F$, is defined as the determinant of the $n \times n$ Jacobian matrix consisting of the partial derivatives of $f_i$ with respect to $X_j$:

$$J_F = \left | \begin{matrix} \frac{\partial f_1}{\partial X_1} & \cdots & \frac{\partial f_1}{\partial X_n} \\
\vdots & \ddots & \vdots \\
\frac{\partial f_n}{\partial X_1} & \cdots & \frac{\partial f_n}{\partial X_n} \end{matrix} \right |,$$

then $J_F$ is itself a polynomial function of the $n$ variables $X_1, \dots, X_n$.

It follows from the multivariable chain rule that if $F$ has a polynomial inverse function $G : \mathbb{K}^n \to \mathbb{K}^n$, then $J_F$ has a polynomial reciprocal, so is a nonzero constant. The Jacobian conjecture is the following partial converse:

Jacobian conjecture: Let $\mathbb{K}$ have characteristic $0$. If $J_F$ is a non-zero constant, then $F$ has an inverse function $G : \mathbb{K}^n \to \mathbb{K}^n$ that is regular, meaning its components are polynomials.

The condition $J_F \neq 0$ is related to the inverse function theorem in multivariable calculus. In fact for smooth functions (and so in particular for polynomials) a smooth local inverse function to $F$ exists at every point where $J_F$ is non-zero. This means there is a neighborhood of each such point that is mapped bijectively onto its image. For example, the real function $x \mapsto x + x^3$ has a smooth global inverse, but the inverse is not polynomial. A differentiable function with a non-zero Jacobian is locally invertible in higher dimensions as well. For example, the function $F(x,y) = (e^x\cos(e^{-2x}y),e^x\sin(e^{-2x}y))$ maps $\mathbb R^2$ to itself (or $\mathbb C^2$ to itself) and has constant Jacobian 1. This means intuitively that it bends the plane around like a rubber sheet without locally expanding or compressing area, so it cannot create pinches or other kinds of degeneration locally: a small disc around each point is sent one-to-one onto a small domain in the image. Nevertheless, the function maps all points $(x,y+2\pi e^{2x}k), k\in\mathbb Z$ to the same point $F(x,y)$, and so causes different parts of the plane to overlap in the image. The analog of the Jacobian conjecture is therefore false for analytic maps; the conjecture is hard because the map is required to be a polynomial.

Apart from injectivity, the Jacobian conjecture is distinguished from analytic mappings because an injective polynomial mapping of $\C^n$ to itself is automatically surjective. This is not true for analytic mappings, and for $n>1$ an example of Pierre Fatou and Ludwig Bieberbach shows that the image of an injective analytic mapping can exclude a nonempty open subset of $\C^n$.

== Results ==
=== General results and reductions ===
The case of polynomials over a field $\mathbb{K}$ of characteristic zero can be reduced to $\mathbb{K}=\mathbb{C}$ using the Lefschetz principle. Further, if $F$ is injective, it can be shown to already be bijective with a regular inverse (cf. the Ax–Grothendieck theorem).

Many special cases and reductions of the Jacobian conjecture were established in the decades before it was disproved in 2026 for $n > 2$. In light of the counterexample, the positive partial results now describe conditions that any counterexample must violate, while the reductions show that counterexamples of quite special forms must exist.

The existence of a polynomial inverse is obvious if $F$ is simply a set of functions linear in the variables, because then the inverse will also be a set of linear functions. However, unlike the 1-dimensional case, in two or more dimensions, there exist nonlinear polynomial maps with constant Jacobian determinant and a polynomial inverse. A simple quadratic example is given by

$$u=x^2+y+x$$
$$v=x^2+y$$

so that the Jacobian determinant is

$$J_F = \left | \begin{matrix} 1+2x & 1 \\
2x & 1 \end{matrix} \right |
= (1+2x)(1) - (1)2x = 1.$$

In this case the inverse exists as the polynomials

$$x=u-v$$
$$y=v-(u-v)^2.$$

Stuart Sui-Sheng Wang proved the Jacobian conjecture for polynomials of degree 2, so any counterexample must have degree at least 3. Hyman Bass, Edwin Connell, and David Wright showed that the general case follows from the special case where the polynomials are of degree 3, or even more specifically, of cubic homogeneous type, meaning of the form $F = (X_1 + H_1, \dots, X_n + H_n)$, where each $H_i$ is either zero or a homogeneous cubic. Ludwik Drużkowski showed that one may further assume that the map is of cubic linear type, meaning that the nonzero $H_i$ are cubes of homogeneous linear polynomials. These reductions introduce additional variables and therefore do not preserve a fixed dimension.

Edwin Connell and Lou van den Dries proved that if the Jacobian conjecture is false, then it has a counterexample with integer coefficients and Jacobian determinant 1.

Let $\mathbb{K}[X]$ denote the polynomial ring $\mathbb{K}[X_1, \dots, X_n]$ and $\mathbb{K}[F]$ denote the $\mathbb{K}$-subalgebra generated by $f_1, \dots, f_n$. For a given $F$, the Jacobian condition implies invertibility if and only if $\mathbb{K}[X] = \mathbb{K}[F]$. Keller (1939) proved the birational case, that is, where the two fields $\mathbb{K}(X)$ and $\mathbb{K}(F)$ are equal. The case where $\mathbb{K}(X)$ is a Galois extension of $\mathbb{K}(F)$ was proved by Andrew Campbell for complex maps and in general by Michael Razar and, independently, by David Wright. No counterexample can therefore be birational or define a Galois extension; consistent with this, the 2026 counterexample is generically three-to-one.

Michiel de Bondt and Arno van den Essen and Ludwik Drużkowski independently showed that the general case of the conjecture is equivalent to the special case of complex maps of cubic homogeneous type with a symmetric Jacobian matrix, so counterexamples of this form must also exist. They further showed that the conjecture holds for maps of cubic linear type with a symmetric Jacobian matrix, over any field of characteristic $0$; no counterexample of this more restricted form is therefore possible, so the cubic-linear and symmetric reductions cannot be combined.

The strong real Jacobian conjecture was the assertion that a real polynomial map with a nowhere vanishing Jacobian determinant has a smooth global inverse. That is equivalent to asking whether such a map is topologically a proper map, in which case it is a covering map of a simply connected manifold, hence invertible. Sergey Pinchuk constructed a counterexample to the strong real Jacobian conjecture with components of degree 10 and 25. Because Pinchuk's maps have nonconstant Jacobian determinant, they did not disprove the Jacobian conjecture itself.

For $n\ge 1$, the Dixmier conjecture $\mathrm{DC}_n$ states that every endomorphism of the $n$-th Weyl algebra $A_n$ over a field of characteristic zero is an automorphism. For each $n$, the Dixmier conjecture for $A_n$ implies the $n$-dimensional Jacobian conjecture. Conversely, Yoshifumi Tsuchimoto and, independently, Alexei Belov-Kanel and Maxim Kontsevich showed that the Jacobian conjecture in $2n$ variables implies the Dixmier conjecture for $A_n$.

Kossivi Adjamagbo and Arno van den Essen gave a self-contained algebraic proof and established the more precise chain of implications

$$\mathrm{JC}_{2n}\Longrightarrow\mathrm{PC}_n\Longrightarrow\mathrm{DC}_n\Longrightarrow\mathrm{JC}_n,$$

where $\mathrm{PC}_n$ denotes the Poisson conjecture for the canonical complex Poisson algebra in $2n$ variables. Consequently, the all-dimensional forms of the Jacobian, Poisson, and Dixmier conjectures are equivalent.

Since the 2026 counterexample disproves $\mathrm{JC}_n$ for every $n>2$, the above implications show that $\mathrm{DC}_n$ and $\mathrm{PC}_n$ are also false for every $n>2$, while both conjectures remain open for $n=1,2$.

=== In two dimensions ===
The conjecture remains open in two dimensions as of 2026. Much of the study of the two-dimensional conjecture concerns the geometry of a hypothetical counterexample at infinity. In two variables, a pair of polynomials is called a Jacobian pair if its Jacobian determinant is a nonzero constant. Shreeram Abhyankar proved that each component of a Jacobian pair has at most two points at infinity. He also showed that the planar conjecture is equivalent to each of several assertions about all Jacobian pairs, including that each component has only one point at infinity, that the Newton polygon of each component is a triangle, and that one of the two component degrees divides the other. Using characteristic sequences and approximate roots, Abhyankar proved the conjecture in the case of two characteristic pairs and later sharpened this to what he called the "two plus epsilon characteristic pairs" case. His subsequent work developed the more general "three minus epsilon characteristic pairs" setting.

Another line of work has progressively restricted the possible degree pairs and Newton polygons of a counterexample. Raymond C. Heitmann showed that any counterexample $(P,Q)$ must satisfy $\gcd(\deg P,\deg Q)\geq 16.$ Jorge A. Guccione, Juan J. Guccione, and Christian Valqui subsequently gave an elementary proof of Heitmann's result using refinements of Abhyankar's methods, proved that $\gcd(\deg P,\deg Q)\ne 2p$ for every prime $p$, and obtained further restrictions on the possible shape of a counterexample. Leonid Makar-Limanov later introduced a Newton polyhedron associated with a minimal counterexample, obtaining a sharper estimate for its geometric degree and a new proof of Abhyankar's result for two characteristic pairs.

More recent geometric approaches study hypothetical Jacobian pairs through compactifications of the affine plane. Alexander Borisov formulated the resulting constraints on the maps between the Picard groups of suitable compactifications as an essentially combinatorial problem and described several possible configurations, which he called "frameworks". A framework is not itself a counterexample: each gives a system of equations whose solution would produce a Jacobian pair.

A complementary line of work concerns the possible covering behavior of a counterexample. In 1971, Anatoli Vitushkin constructed a three-sheeted branched covering whose regular part is contractible and whose bifurcation set is homeomorphic to a plane. The example provided a topological model relevant to the three-sheeted case, but was not a polynomial map. S. Yu. Orevkov subsequently proved that the Jacobian of a three-sheeted polynomial map $\mathbb C^2\to\mathbb C^2$ cannot be a nonzero constant. Orevkov later constructed an analytic realization of the Vitushkin covering over a ball in $\mathbb C^2$, while Nguyen Van Chau proved that the Vitushkin covering cannot occur in the polynomial case. Vitushkin also constructed noninvertible rational transformations of $\mathbb C^2$ with nonzero constant Jacobian. One of his examples has a pole along a complex line, but on the complement of that line it defines a two-sheeted étale cover of the complement of a discriminant curve in $\mathbb C^2$; in particular, it is generically two-to-one, but is not a polynomial counterexample.

A separate computational line has sought to exclude counterexamples of progressively higher degree. Tzuong-Tsieng Moh's 1983 computer-assisted argument, with its algorithm subsequently revised by Lih-Chung Wang in 2005, verified it for polynomials of degree at most 100. This bound was increased to 104 by Thuy Nguyen in 2025. In a 2022 preprint, Jorge Alberto Guccione, Juan José Guccione, Rodrigo Horruitiner, and Christian Valqui claimed that this bound can be increased to 108, and furthermore to exclude all degree pairs of maximum degree up to 124 except for (72,108).

=== Counterexample for n > 2 ===
On July 19, 2026, mathematician and Anthropic employee Levent Alpöge presented an explicit counterexample to the conjecture in three-dimensional space which he credited to the Claude Fable 5 AI model. According to Abhishek Saha of the Queen Mary University of London, the counterexample is simple to verify in itself, but how Alpöge and Fable exactly arrived at it is unclear.

Given the polynomial map $F : \mathbb{C}^3 \to \mathbb{C}^3,$ where
$$\begin{aligned}F(x,y,z)={}\bigl(~\!& (1+xy)^3 z + y^2 (1+xy) (4+3xy),\\ &y + 3x(1+xy)^2 z + 3xy^2 (4+3xy), \\ &2x - 3x^2 y - x^3 z ~\!\bigr).\end{aligned}$$

The Jacobian determinant of this function is the constant −2. However, the map is not invertible, as it maps multiple distinct points to the same image. For example, Alpöge gives
$$\begin{aligned}
F\bigl(0,0,-\tfrac{1}{4}\bigr) = F\bigl(1,-\tfrac{3}{2},\tfrac{13}{2}\bigr) = F\bigl({-1},\tfrac{3}{2},\tfrac{13}{2}\bigr)
&= \bigl({-\tfrac{1}{4}},0,0\bigr).
\end{aligned}$$
It was not necessary to find such points explicitly. If a polynomial map $F:\mathbb C^n\to\mathbb C^n$ is injective, then it is a polynomial automorphism. Consequently each component of $F$ is a coordinate polynomial, and is therefore irreducible. Since both $F_1$ and $F_3$ have nontrivial factorizations, $F$ cannot be injective.

Given the definition of $F$ above, it follows that for any integer $n \ge 4$, the polynomial map
$$\mathbb C^n \to \mathbb C^n, \quad (x_1, x_2, x_3, x_4, \dots, x_{n}) \mapsto (F(x_1,x_2,x_3), x_4, \dots, x_{n})$$
then gives a counterexample in $n$ variables. The same holds for any other counterexample in dimension 3.

The day after Alpöge found the counterexample, a geometric reformulation was announced by Andy Jiang, a postdoctoral fellow in mathematics at Academia Sinica, who credited it to "GPT".

Terence Tao, a mathematician from the University of California, Los Angeles (UCLA), discussed this geometric explanation of the counterexample using multiplication of binary forms. A generic binary cubic has three linear factors, and hence three ways to express it as the product of a distinguished linear factor and the remaining quadratic factor. After imposing a resultant normalization to remove the scaling ambiguity and restricting to a particular affine slice of the space of binary cubics, Tao obtained an étale, generically three-to-one map $X\to\mathbb C^3$ from a three-fold $X$ inside $\mathbb C^5$ (identified with $\mathbb{C}^2\times\operatorname{Sym}^2\mathbb{C}^2$, pairs of linear and quadratic binary forms) which is explicitly polynomially isomorphic to $\mathbb C^3$. This cubic factorization construction is similar to the earlier quadratic example by Vitushkin.

A 7-page paper was published on July 20, 2026, on ulam.ai, detailing a counterexample to the Jacobian conjecture in three-dimensional space. Following the publication, Adrian Vasiu asserted that the AI-generated paper borrowed notation and concepts from a prior draft he had co-written with Alexander Borisov and Ofer Gabber. A version of that draft, dated January 14, 2025, was shared publicly two days later. On July 23, 2026, a graduate student shared a separate AI-authored paper with Vasiu that explained the counterexample using the Borisov-Gabber-Vasiu framework. Vasiu suggested that their original draft had been integrated into the training data of AI models. Levent Alpöge later stated that the trio of authors should receive credit for the foundational work they had achieved, to the extent that it was close to the result.

Arno van den Essen also showed that a three-dimensional counterexample to the Jacobian conjecture can be found using only elementary mathematics techniques.

== Variants of the Jacobian conjecture for fields with positive characteristic ==
The obvious analogue of the Jacobian conjecture fails if $\mathbb{K}$ has characteristic $p > 0$ even for one variable. The characteristic of a field, if it is not zero, must be prime, so at least $2$. The polynomial $x - x^{p}$ has derivative $1 - px^{p-1}$, which is $1$ (because $p = 0$ in characteristic $p$) but it has no inverse function. There are a few ways to modify the Jacobian conjecture to get around this issue.

=== Separable Jacobian conjecture ===
Kossivi Adjamagbo suggested extending the Jacobian conjecture to characteristic $p > 0$ by adding the hypothesis that $p$ does not divide the degree of the field extension $\mathbb{K}(X) / \mathbb{K}(F)$. This conjecture is called Adjamagbo's Jacobian conjecture after Kossivi Adjamagbo, or the separable Jacobian conjecture because Adjamagbo's condition guarantees that the field extension is separable. By design, the separable Jacobian conjecture coincides with the usual Jacobian conjecture for fields of characteristic zero, because given a field $\mathbb{K}$ of characteristic zero, zero never divides the degree of the field extension $\mathbb{K}(X) / \mathbb{K}(F)$ for any polynomial map $F$ over $\mathbb{K}^n$.

For the separable Jacobian conjecture in characteristic two, in a 2026 preprint, Irit Huq-Kuruvilla claimed to have produced a counterexample in dimensions $n \geq 3$, and in another 2026 preprint, Romy Mondello claimed to have produced a counterexample in two dimensions. Finally, in a third 2026 preprint, Alexander Borisov, Ofer Gabber, and Adrian Vasiu claimed to have produced counterexamples to Adjamagbo's separable Jacobian conjecture for all positive characteristics in all dimensions $n \geq 2$. The case $n = 1$ is true for the separable Jacobian conjecture for any positive characteristic $p$, since Adjamagbo's hypothesis that $p$ does not divide the degree of the field extension $\mathbb{K}(X) / \mathbb{K}(F)$ of the polynomial $F$ guarantees that the derivative of the polynomial is a nonzero constant only if the degree of the polynomial is $1,$ and linear polynomial functions are invertible.

=== Maubach and Rauf's Jacobian Conjecture ===
Stefan Maubach and Abdul Rauf suggested an alternative to Adjamabgo's Jacobian conjecture, where they extended the Jacobian conjecture to characteristic $p > 0$ by replacing the condition of a Keller map in the premise with what they call a strong Keller map. Maubach and Rauf later in the same article show that for characteristic zero fields, every Keller map is a strong Keller map, and thus that their version of the Jacobian conjecture coincides with the usual Jacobian conjecture for characteristic zero fields.

== See also ==
- Abhyankar–Moh theorem
- FrontierMath
- List of unsolved problems in mathematics
