= Abhyankar's lemma =

Allows one to kill tame ramification by taking an extension of a base field

In mathematics, Abhyankar's lemma (named after Shreeram Shankar Abhyankar) allows one to kill tame ramification by taking an extension of a base field.

More precisely, Abhyankar's lemma states that if A, B, C are local fields such that A and B are finite extensions of C, with ramification indices a and b, and B is tamely ramified over C and b divides a, then the compositum AB is an unramified extension of A.

== See also ==
- Finite extensions of local fields
