= Dixmier conjecture =

On endomorphisms of Weyl algebras

In algebra, the Dixmier conjecture, stated by Jacques Dixmier in 1968, originally asked whether any endomorphism of the first Weyl algebra $A_1$ over a field of characteristic zero is an automorphism. The analogous statement for the $n$-th Weyl algebra $A_n$ was recorded in 1982 by Bass, Connell, and Wright, who attributed it to communications from Leonid Vaserstein and Victor Kac, and was later referred to as the "generalized Dixmier conjecture".

Tsuchimoto in 2005, and independently Belov-Kanel and Kontsevich in 2007, showed that the Dixmier conjecture is stably equivalent to the Jacobian conjecture: the Dixmier conjecture for the n-th Weyl algebra $A_n$ implies the Jacobian conjecture for polynomial maps in n variables, while conversely the Jacobian conjecture in $2n$ variables implies the Dixmier conjecture for $A_n$. In July 2026, a counterexample to the Jacobian conjecture in three variables was found, which by the first of these implications shows that the Dixmier conjecture is false for $A_n$ for all $n \geq 3$.

The conjecture remains open for the first and second Weyl algebras, since the Jacobian conjecture is still open in two variables. The case of the first Weyl algebra $A_1$ was the problem originally posed by Dixmier; a proposed proof of this case was announced by Alexander Zheglov in 2024.
