= Abhyankar's conjecture =

In abstract algebra, Abhyankar's conjecture for affine curves is a conjecture of Shreeram Abhyankar posed in 1957, on the Galois groups of algebraic function fields of characteristic p. The soluble case was solved by Serre in 1990 and the full conjecture was proved in 1994 by work of Michel Raynaud and David Harbater.

== Statement ==
The problem involves a finite group G, a prime number p, and the function field K(C) of a nonsingular integral algebraic curve C defined over an algebraically closed field K of characteristic p.

The question addresses the existence of a Galois extension L of K(C), with G as Galois group, and with specified ramification. From a geometric point of view, L corresponds to another curve C′, together with a morphism

π : C′ → C.

Geometrically, the assertion that π is ramified at a finite set S of points on C means that π restricted to the complement of S in C is an étale morphism. This is in analogy with the case of Riemann surfaces. In Abhyankar's conjecture, S is fixed, and the question is what G can be. This is therefore a special type of inverse Galois problem.

== Results ==
The subgroup p(G) is defined to be the subgroup generated by all the Sylow subgroups of G for the prime number p. This is a normal subgroup, and the parameter n is defined as the minimum number of generators of

G/p(G).

Raynaud proved the case where C is the projective line over K, the conjecture stating that G can be realised as a Galois group of L, unramified outside S containing s + 1 points, if and only if

n ≤ s.

The general case was proved by Harbater. Where g is the genus of C, G can be realised if and only if

n ≤ s + 2 g.
