= Ott-Heinrich Keller =

German mathematician (1906–1990)

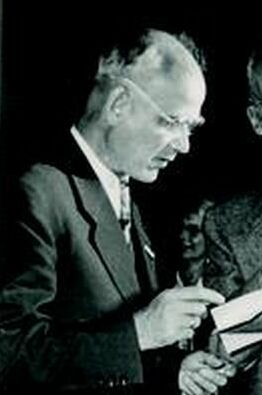
Ott-Heinrich Keller

Eduard Ott-Heinrich Keller (22 June 1906 – 5 December 1990) was a German mathematician who worked in the fields of geometry, topology and algebraic geometry. He formulated the celebrated problem which is now called the Jacobian conjecture in 1939.

He was born in Frankfurt–am-Main, and studied at the universities of Frankfurt, Vienna, Berlin and Göttingen. As a student of Max Dehn he wrote a dissertation on the tiling of space with cubes. This led to another 'Keller conjecture': the Keller cube-tiling conjecture from 1930.

Subsequently, he worked with Georg Hamel in Berlin, habilitating in 1933 with a thesis on Cremona transformations. The Jacobian conjecture is quite naturally posed in that setting. The motivation for looking at rather general polynomial transformations, say of the projective plane, came from the singularity theory for algebraic curves.

During World War II he taught in a naval college in Flensburg. After the war he had several positions, and was appointed a professor at Martin Luther University of Halle-Wittenberg in 1952, as successor of H. W. E. Jung.
