= Alexander L. Rosenberg =

Russian-American mathematician

- Born: 1946
- Died: 2012 (aged 65–66)
- Education: Lomonosov Moscow State University (Ph.D., 1973)
- Known for: Noncommutative algebraic geometry, Gabriel-Rosenberg reconstruction theorem
- Scientific career
- Workplaces: Kansas State University
- Doctoral advisor: Yuri Manin

Alexander Lvovich Rosenberg (Russian: Александр Львович Розенберг, 1946–2012) was a Russian-American mathematician who worked on functional analysis, representation theory and noncommutative algebraic geometry. He graduated from Lomonosov Moscow State University in 1973, left the Soviet Union around 1987, and was a professor at Kansas State University until 2012.

He is known for his contributions to Tannaka duality and noncommutative algebraic geometry. He introduced several notions of spectrum for an abelian category (Rosenberg's spectrum), and the related Gabriel-Rosenberg reconstruction theorem bears his name.

== Publications ==
- A. L. Rosenberg, Noncommutative algebraic geometry and representations of quantized algebras, MIA 330, Kluwer Academic Publishers Group, Dordrecht, 1995. xii+315 pp. ISBN 0-7923-3575-9
- M. Kontsevich, A. Rosenberg, Noncommutative smooth spaces, The Gelfand Mathematical Seminars, 1996–1999, 85–108, Gelfand Math. Sem., Birkhäuser, Boston 2000; arXiv:math/9812158
- A. L. Rosenberg, Noncommutative schemes, Compositio Mathematica 112 (1998) 93–125, doi; Underlying spaces of noncommutative schemes, preprint MPIM2003-111, dvi, ps; MSRI lecture Noncommutative schemes and spaces (Feb 2000): video
