= Weyl algebra =

Differential algebra

In abstract algebra, the Weyl algebras are abstracted from the ring of differential operators with polynomial coefficients. They are named after Hermann Weyl, who introduced them to study the Heisenberg uncertainty principle in quantum mechanics.

In the simplest case, these are differential operators. Let $F$ be a field, and let $F[x]$ be the ring of polynomials in one variable with coefficients in $F$. Then the corresponding Weyl algebra consists of differential operators of the form

$$f_m(x) \partial_x^m + f_{m-1}(x) \partial_x^{m-1} + \cdots + f_1(x) \partial_x + f_0(x)$$

where $f_i(x)\in F[x]$.

This is the first Weyl algebra $A_1$. The n-th Weyl algebra $A_n$ is constructed similarly.

Alternatively, $A_1$ can be constructed as the quotient of the free algebra on two generators, q and p, by the ideal generated by $([p,q] - 1)$. More generally, $A_n$ is obtained by quotienting the free algebra on 2n generators by the ideal generated by
$$[p_{i},q_{j}]-\delta _{i,j},\quad  [p_{i},p_{j}],\quad [q_{i},q_{j}] \quad \forall i,j=1,\dots ,n$$
where $\delta_{i,j}$ is the Kronecker delta.

More generally, let $(R,\Delta)$ be a partial differential ring with commuting derivatives $\Delta = \lbrace \partial_1,\ldots,\partial_m \rbrace$. The Weyl algebra associated to $(R,\Delta)$ is the noncommutative ring $R[\partial_1,\ldots,\partial_m]$ satisfying the relations $\partial_i r = r\partial_i + \partial_i(r)$ for all $r \in R$. The previous case is the special case where $R=F[x_1,\ldots,x_n]$ and $\Delta = \lbrace \partial_{x_1},\ldots,\partial_{x_n} \rbrace$ where $F$ is a field.

This article discusses only the case of $A_n$ with underlying field $F$ characteristic zero, unless otherwise stated.

The Weyl algebra is an example of a simple ring that is not a matrix ring over a division ring. It is also a noncommutative example of a domain, and an example of an Ore extension.

== Motivation ==
The Weyl algebra arises naturally in the context of quantum mechanics and the process of canonical quantization. Consider a classical phase space with canonical coordinates $(q_1, p_1, \dots, q_n, p_n)$. These coordinates satisfy the Poisson bracket relations:
$$\{q_i, q_j\} = 0, \quad \{p_i, p_j\} = 0, \quad \{q_i, p_j\} = \delta_{ij}.$$
In canonical quantization, one seeks to construct a Hilbert space of states and represent the classical observables (functions on phase space) as self-adjoint operators on this space. The canonical commutation relations are imposed:
$$[\hat{q}_i, \hat{q}_j] = 0, \quad [\hat{p}_i, \hat{p}_j] = 0, \quad [\hat{q}_i, \hat{p}_j] = i\hbar \delta_{ij},$$
where $[\cdot, \cdot]$ denotes the commutator. Here, $\hat{q}_i$ and $\hat{p}_i$ are the operators corresponding to $q_i$ and $p_i$ respectively. Erwin Schrödinger proposed in 1926 the following:

- $\hat{q_j}$ with multiplication by $x_j$.
- $\hat{p}_j$ with $-i\hbar \partial_{x_j}$.

With this identification, the canonical commutation relation holds.

== Constructions ==
The Weyl algebras have different constructions, with different levels of abstraction.

=== Representation ===
The Weyl algebra $A_n$ can be concretely constructed as a representation.

In the differential operator representation, similar to Schrödinger's canonical quantization, let $q_j$ be represented by multiplication on the left by $x_j$, and let $p_j$ be represented by differentiation on the left by $\partial_{x_j}$.

In the matrix representation, similar to the matrix mechanics, $A_1$ is represented by
$$P=\begin{bmatrix}
0 & 1 & 0 & 0 & \cdots \\
0 & 0 & 2 & 0 & \cdots \\
0 & 0 & 0 & 3 & \cdots \\
\vdots & \vdots & \vdots & \vdots & \ddots
\end{bmatrix}, \quad Q=\begin{bmatrix}
0 & 0 & 0 & 0 & \ldots \\
1 & 0 & 0 & 0 & \cdots \\
0 & 1 & 0 & 0 & \cdots \\
\vdots & \vdots & \vdots & \vdots & \ddots
\end{bmatrix}$$
obeying $[P,Q]=1.$

=== Generator ===
$A_n$ can be constructed as a quotient of a free algebra in terms of generators and relations. One construction starts with an abstract vector space $V$ (of dimension $2n$) equipped with a symplectic form $\omega$. Define the Weyl algebra $W(V)$ to be

$$W(V) := T(V) / (\!( v \otimes u - u \otimes v - \omega(v,u), \text{ for } v,u \in V )\!),$$

where $T(V)$ is the tensor algebra on $V$, and the notation $(\!( )\!)$ means "the ideal generated by".

In other words, $W(V)$ is the algebra generated by $V$ subject only to the relation $vu-uv=\omega(v,u)$. Then, $W(V)$ is isomorphic to $A_n$ via the choice of a Darboux basis for $\omega$.

$A_n$ is also a quotient of the universal enveloping algebra of the Heisenberg algebra, the Lie algebra of the Heisenberg group, by setting the central element of the Heisenberg algebra (namely $[q,p]$) equal to the unit of the universal enveloping algebra (called 1 above).

=== Quantization ===
The algebra $W(V)$ is a quantization of the symmetric algebra $\mathrm{Sym}(V)$. If $V$ is over a field of characteristic zero, then $W(V)$ is naturally isomorphic to the underlying vector space of the symmetric algebra $\mathrm{Sym}(V)$ equipped with a deformed product – called the Groenewold–Moyal product (considering the symmetric algebra to be polynomial functions on $V^*$, where the variables span the vector space $V$, and replacing $i\hbar$ in the Moyal product formula with $1$.)

The isomorphism is given by the symmetrization map from $\mathrm{Sym}(V)$ to $W(V)$

$$a_1 \cdots a_n \mapsto \frac{1}{n!} \sum_{\sigma \in S_n} a_{\sigma(1)} \otimes \cdots \otimes a_{\sigma(n)}~.$$

If one prefers to have the $i\hbar$ and work over the complex numbers, one could have instead defined the Weyl algebra above as generated by $q_i$ and $i\hbar\partial_{q_i}$ (as per quantum mechanics usage).

Thus, the Weyl algebra is a quantization of the symmetric algebra, which is essentially the same as the Moyal quantization (if for the latter one restricts to polynomial functions), but the former is in terms of generators and relations (considered to be differential operators) and the latter is in terms of a deformed multiplication.

Stated in another way, let the Moyal star product be denoted $f \star g$, then the Weyl algebra is isomorphic to $(\mathbb C[x_1, \dots, x_n], \star)$.

The same construction passes through when $\mathrm{Sym}(V)$ is replaced by $\mathrm{Alt}(V),$ the alternating or exterior algebra; in that case, the result is the Clifford algebra. Likewise, the construction as a quotient space of the tensor algebra modulo an ideal has the same form; the difference being that the ideal is generated by a symmetric bilinear form in place of the symplectic form. To reflect the similarity of the construction, the Weyl algebra is often called the symplectic Clifford algebra, while the name orthogonal Clifford algebra is given to that generated by the symmetric form; the "orthogonal" moniker coming from the relationship of the Clifford algebra to rotations. Despite the similarity of construction, these are usually treated distinctly, as they differ dramatically from the point of view of representation theory. The representations of the (orthogonal) Clifford algebras are finite-dimensional, while the Weyl algebra has none that are finite-dimensional; its representation is infinite-dimensional and unique.

=== D-module ===
The Weyl algebra can be constructed as a D-module. Specifically, the Weyl algebra corresponding to the polynomial ring $R[x_1, ..., x_n]$ with its usual partial differential structure is precisely equal to Grothendieck's ring of differential operations $D_{\mathbb{A}^n_R / R}$.

More generally, let $X$ be a smooth scheme over a ring $R$. Locally, $X \to R$ factors as an étale cover over some $\mathbb{A}^n_R$ equipped with the standard projection. Because "étale" means "(flat and) possessing null cotangent sheaf", this means that every D-module over such a scheme can be thought of locally as a module over the $n^\text{th}$ Weyl algebra.

Let $R$ be a commutative algebra over a subring $S$. The ring of differential operators $D_{R/S}$ (notated $D_R$ when $S$ is clear from context) is inductively defined as a graded subalgebra of $\operatorname{End}_{S}(R)$:

- $D^0_R=R$
- $D^k_R=\left\{d \in \operatorname{End}_{S}(R):[d, a] \in D^{k-1}_R \text { for all } a \in R\right\} .$

Let $D_R$ be the union of all $D^k_R$ for $k \geq 0$. This is a subalgebra of $\operatorname{End}_{S}(R)$.

In the case $R = S[x_1, ..., x_n]$, the ring of differential operators of order $\leq n$ presents similarly as in the special case $S = \mathbb{C}$ but for the added consideration of "divided power operators"; these are operators corresponding to those in the complex case which stabilize $\mathbb{Z}[x_1, ..., x_n]$, but which cannot be written as integral combinations of higher-order operators, i.e. do not inhabit $D_{\mathbb{A}^n_\mathbb{Z} / \mathbb{Z}}$. One such example is the operator $\partial_{x_1}^{[p]} : x_1^N \mapsto {N \choose p} x_1^{N-p}$.

Explicitly, a presentation is given by

$$D_{S[x_1, \dots, x_\ell]/S}^n = S \langle x_1, \dots, x_\ell, \{\partial_{x_i}, \partial_{x_i}^{[2]}, \dots, \partial_{x_i}^{[n]}\}_{1 \leq i \leq \ell} \rangle$$

with the relations

$$[x_i, x_j] = [\partial_{x_i}^{[k]}, \partial_{x_j}^{[m]}] = 0$$
$$[\partial_{x_i}^{[k]}, x_j] = \left \{ \begin{matrix}\partial_{x_i}^{[k-1]} & \text{if }i=j \\ 0 & \text{if } i \neq j\end{matrix}\right.$$
$$\partial_{x_i}^{[k]} \partial_{x_i}^{[m]} = {k+m \choose k} \partial_{x_i}^{[k+m]} ~~~~~\text{when }k+m \leq n$$

where $\partial_{x_i}^{[0]} = 1$ by convention. The Weyl algebra then consists of the limit of these algebras as $n \to \infty$.

When $S$ is a field of characteristic 0, then $D^1_R$ is generated, as an $R$-module, by 1 and the $S$-derivations of $R$. Moreover, $D_R$ is generated as a ring by the $R$-subalgebra $D^1_R$. In particular, if $S = \mathbb{C}$ and $R=\mathbb{C}[x_1, ..., x_n]$, then $D^1_R=R+ \sum_i R \partial_{x_i}$. As mentioned, $A_n = D_R$.

== Properties of A_{n} ==
Many properties of $A_1$ apply to $A_n$ with essentially similar proofs, since the different dimensions commute.

=== General Leibniz rule ===
Theorem (general Leibniz rule)—
$$p^k q^m = \sum_{l=0}^k \binom{k}{l} \frac{m!}{(m-l)!} q^{m-l} p^{k-l} = q^mp^k + mk q^{m-1}p^{k-1} + \cdots$$

Proof

Under the $p \mapsto \partial_x, q \mapsto x$ representation, this equation is obtained by the general Leibniz rule. Since the general Leibniz rule is provable by algebraic manipulation, it holds for $A_1$ as well.

In particular, $[q, q^m p^n] = -nq^mp^{n-1}$ and $[p, q^mp^n] = mq^{m-1}p^n$.

Corollary—The center of Weyl algebra $A_n$ is the underlying field of constants $F$.

Proof

If the commutator of $f$ with either of $p, q$ is zero, then by the previous statement, $f$ has no monomial $p^nq^m$ with $n > 0$ or $m > 0$.

=== Degree ===
Theorem—$A_n$ has a basis $\{q^m p^n : m, n \geq 0\}$.

Proof

By repeating the commutator relations, any monomial can be equated to a linear sum of these. It remains to check that these are linearly independent. This can be checked in the differential operator representation. For any linear sum $\sum_{m, n} c_{m,n} x^m \partial_x^n$ with nonzero coefficients, group it in descending order: $p_N(x) \partial_x^N + p_{N-1}(x) \partial_x^{N-1} + \cdots + p_M(x) \partial_x^M$, where $p_M$ is a nonzero polynomial. This operator applied to $x^M$ results in $M! p_M(x) \neq 0$.

This allows $A_1$ to be a graded algebra, where the degree of $\sum_{m, n} c_{m,n} q^m p^n$ is $\max (m + n)$ among its nonzero monomials. The degree is similarly defined for $A_n$.

Theorem—For $A_n$:

- $\deg(g + h) \leq \max(\deg(g), \deg(h))$
- $\deg([g, h]) \leq \deg(g) + \deg(h) - 2$
- $\deg(g h) = \deg(g) + \deg(h)$
Proof

We prove it for $A_1$, as the $A_n$ case is similar.

The first relation is by definition. The second relation is by the general Leibniz rule. For the third relation, note that $\deg(g h) \leq \deg(g) + \deg(h)$, so it is sufficient to check that $gh$ contains at least one nonzero monomial that has degree $\deg(g) + \deg(h)$. To find such a monomial, pick the one in $g$ with the highest degree. If there are multiple such monomials, pick the one with the highest power in $q$. Similarly for $h$. These two monomials, when multiplied together, create a unique monomial among all monomials of $gh$, and so it remains nonzero.

Theorem—$A_n$ is a simple domain.

That is, it has no two-sided nontrivial ideals and has no zero divisors.

Proof

Because $\deg(gh) = \deg(g) + \deg(h)$, it has no zero divisors.

Suppose for contradiction that $I$ is a nonzero two-sided ideal of $A_1$, with $I \neq A_1$. Pick a nonzero element $f \in I$ with the lowest degree.

If $f$ contains some nonzero monomial of form $xx^m\partial^n = x^{m+1} \partial^n$, then
$$[\partial, f] = \partial f - f \partial$$
contains a nonzero monomial of form
$$\partial x^{m+1} \partial^n -  x^{m+1} \partial^n \partial = (m+1) x^m \partial^n.$$
Thus $[\partial, f]$ is nonzero, and has degree $\leq \deg(f)-1$. As $I$ is a two-sided ideal, we have $[\partial, f] \in I$, which contradicts the minimality of $\deg(f)$.

Similarly, if $f$ contains some nonzero monomial of form $x^m\partial^n\partial$, then $[x, f] = xf - fx$ is nonzero with lower degree.

=== Derivation ===
Theorem—The derivations of $A_n$ are in bijection with the elements of $A_n$ up to an additive scalar.

That is, any derivation $D$ is equal to $[\cdot, f]$ for some $f \in A_n$; any $f\in A_n$ yields a derivation $[\cdot, f]$; if $f, f' \in A_n$ satisfies $[\cdot, f] = [\cdot, f']$, then $f - f' \in F$.

The proof is similar to computing the potential function for a conservative polynomial vector field on the plane.

Proof

Since the commutator is a derivation in both of its entries, $[\cdot, f]$ is a derivation for any $f\in A_n$. Uniqueness up to additive scalar is because the center of $A_n$ is the ring of scalars.

It remains to prove that any derivation is an inner derivation by induction on $n$.

Base case: Let $D: A_1 \to A_1$ be a linear map that is a derivation. We construct an element $r$ such that $[p, r] = D(p), [q,r] = D(q)$. Since both $D$ and $[\cdot, r]$ are derivations, these two relations generate $[g, r] = D(g)$ for all $g\in A_1$.

Since $[p, q^mp^n] = mq^{m-1}p^n$, there exists an element $f = \sum_{m,n} c_{m,n} q^m p^n$ such that
$$[p, f] =  \sum_{m,n} m c_{m,n} q^m p^n = D(p)$$

$$\begin{aligned}
0 &\stackrel{[p, q] = 1}{=} D([p, q]) \\
&\stackrel{D \text{ is a derivation}}{=} [p, D(q)] + [D(p), q] \\
&\stackrel{[p,f] = D(p)}{=}  [p, D(q)] + [[p,f], q] \\
&\stackrel{\text{Jacobi identity}}{=} [p, D(q) - [q, f]]
\end{aligned}$$

Thus, $D(q) = g(p) + [q, f]$ for some polynomial $g$. Now, since $[q, q^m p^n] = -nq^mp^{n-1}$, there exists some polynomial $h(p)$ such that $[q, h(p)] = g(p)$. Since $[p, h(p)] = 0$, $r = f + h(p)$ is the desired element.

For the induction step, similarly to the above calculation, there exists some element $r \in A_n$ such that $[q_1, r] = D(q_1), [p_1, r] = D(p_1)$.

Similar to the above calculation,
$$[x, D(y) - [y, r]] = 0$$
for all $x \in \{p_1, q_1\}, y \in \{p_2, \dots, p_n, q_2, \dots, q_n\}$. Since $[x, D(y) - [y, r]]$ is a derivation in both $x$ and $y$, $[x, D(y) - [y, r]] = 0$ for all $x\in \langle p_1, q_1\rangle$ and all $y \in \langle p_2, \dots, p_n, q_2, \dots, q_n\rangle$. Here, $\langle \rangle$ means the subalgebra generated by the elements.

Thus, $\forall y \in \langle p_2, \dots, p_n, q_2, \dots, q_n\rangle$,
$$D(y) - [y, r] \in \langle p_2, \dots, p_n, q_2, \dots, q_n\rangle$$

Since $D - [\cdot, r]$ is also a derivation, by induction, there exists $r' \in \langle p_2, \dots, p_n, q_2, \dots, q_n\rangle$ such that $D(y) - [y, r] = [y, r']$ for all $y \in \langle p_2, \dots, p_n, q_2, \dots, q_n\rangle$.

Since $p_1, q_1$ commutes with $\langle p_2, \dots, p_n, q_2, \dots, q_n\rangle$, we have $D(y) = [y, r + r']$ for all $y \in \{p_1, \dots, p_n, q_1, \dots, q_n\}$, and so for all of $A_n$.

== Representation theory ==
=== Zero characteristic ===
In the case that the ground field F has characteristic zero, the nth Weyl algebra is a simple Noetherian domain. It has global dimension n, in contrast to the ring it deforms, Sym(V), which has global dimension 2n.

It has no finite-dimensional representations. Although this follows from simplicity, it can be more directly shown by taking the trace of σ(q) and σ(Y) for some finite-dimensional representation σ (where [q,p] = 1).

$$\mathrm{tr}([\sigma(q),\sigma(Y)])=\mathrm{tr}(1)~.$$

Since the trace of a commutator is zero, and the trace of the identity is the dimension of the representation, the representation must be zero dimensional.

In fact, there are stronger statements than the absence of finite-dimensional representations. To any finitely generated A_{n}-module M, there is a corresponding subvariety Char(M) of V × V^{∗} called the 'characteristic variety' whose size roughly corresponds to the size of M (a finite-dimensional module would have zero-dimensional characteristic variety). Then Bernstein's inequality states that for M non-zero,

$$\dim(\operatorname{char}(M))\geq n$$

An even stronger statement is Gabber's theorem, which states that Char(M) is a co-isotropic subvariety of V × V^{∗} for the natural symplectic form.

=== Positive characteristic ===
The situation is considerably different in the case of a Weyl algebra over a field of characteristic p > 0.

In this case, for any element D of the Weyl algebra, the element D^{p} is central, and so the Weyl algebra has a very large center. In fact, it is a finitely generated module over its center; even more so, it is an Azumaya algebra over its center. As a consequence, there are many finite-dimensional representations which are all built out of simple representations of dimension p.

== Generalizations ==
The ideals and automorphisms of $A_1$ have been well-studied. The moduli space for its right ideal is known. However, the case for $A_n$ is considerably harder and is related to the Jacobian conjecture.

For more details about this quantization in the case n = 1 (and an extension using the Fourier transform to a class of integrable functions larger than the polynomial functions), see Wigner–Weyl transform.

Weyl algebras and Clifford algebras admit a further structure of a *-algebra, and can be unified as even and odd terms of a superalgebra, as discussed in CCR and CAR algebras.

=== Affine varieties ===
Weyl algebras also generalize in the case of algebraic varieties. Consider a polynomial ring

$$R = \frac{\mathbb{C}[x_1,\ldots,x_n]}{I}.$$

Then a differential operator is defined as a composition of $\mathbb{C}$-linear derivations of $R$. This can be described explicitly as the quotient ring

$$\text{Diff}(R) = \frac{\{ D \in A_n\colon D(I) \subseteq I \}}{ I\cdot A_n}.$$

== See also ==
- Jacobian conjecture
- Dixmier conjecture
