= Bernhard Keller =

Swiss mathematician

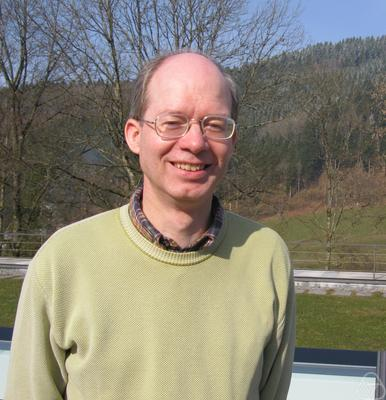
- Keller in Oberwolfach, 2011
- Born: 1962 (age 63–64)
- Education: University of Zurich
- Awards: Sophie Germain Prize
- Scientific career
- Fields: Algebra
- Workplaces: University of Paris VII
- Thesis: On Derived Categories (1990)
- Doctoral advisor: Pierre Gabriel
- Website: https://webusers.imj-prg.fr/~bernhard.keller/indexe.html

Bernhard Keller (born 1962) is a Swiss mathematician, specializing in algebra. He is a professor at the University of Paris.

Keller received in 1990 his PhD from the University of Zurich under Pierre Gabriel with the thesis On Derived Categories.

His research is in homological algebra and the representation theory of quivers and finite-dimensional algebras. He has applied triangulated Calabi–Yau categories to the (additive) categorification of cluster algebras. In 2013, he received an honorary degree from the University of Antwerp. In 2014 he received the Sophie Germain Prize. He was an Invited Speaker at the International Congress of Mathematicians in Madrid in 2006, with a talk On differential graded categories. Keller is a fellow of the American Mathematical Society.

== Selected works ==
- with Idun Reiten: Keller, Bernhard; Reiten, Idun (2007). "Cluster-tilted algebras are Gorenstein and stably Calabi-Yau". Advances in Mathematics. 211 (1): 123–151. arXiv:math/0512471. doi:10.1016/j.aim.2006.07.013.
- Keller, Bernhard (2010). "Cluster algebras, quiver representations and triangulated categories". Triangulated Categories. London Mathematical Society Lecture Note Series. Vol. 375. pp. 76–160. arXiv:0807.1960. doi:10.1017/CBO9781139107075.004. ISBN 978-0-521-74431-7.
- Keller, Bernhard (1996). "Derived categories and their uses". Handbook of Algebra. Vol. 1. pp. 671–701. doi:10.1016/S1570-7954(96)80023-4. ISBN 978-0-444-82212-3.
- "Exposé Bourbaki 1014 : Algèbres amassées et applications, d'après Fomin-Zelevinsky" (PDF). Astérisque. 339: 63–90. 2011.
