= Abhyankar's inequality =

Abhyankar's inequality is an inequality involving extensions of valued fields in algebra, introduced by Abhyankar (1956).

Abhyankar's inequality states that for an extension K/k of valued fields, the transcendence degree of K/k is at least the transcendence degree of the residue field extension plus the rank of the quotient of the valuation groups; here the rank of an abelian group $A$ is defined as $\dim_{\mathbb{Q}}(A \otimes \mathbb{Q})$.
