= Shreeram Shankar Abhyankar =

American mathematician (1930–2012)

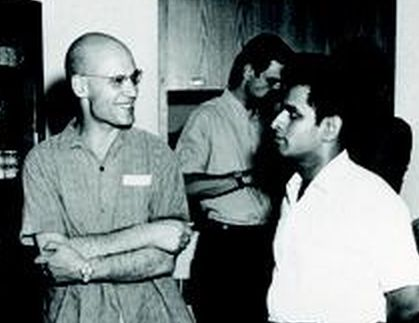
- Shreeram Abhyankar (right) with Alexander Grothendieck (left), Michael Artin in the background, at Montreal, Quebec, Canada in 1970.
- Born: 22 July 1930; Ujjain, Gwalior State, British India (present-day Madhya Pradesh, India)
- Died: 2 November 2012 (aged 82); West Lafayette, Indiana, U.S.
- Citizenship: United States
- Education: University of Mumbai; Harvard University
- Known for: Abhyankar's conjecture, Abhyankar's lemma, Abhyankar–Moh theorem
- Awards: Chauvenet Prize (1978)
- Scientific career
- Fields: Mathematics
- Workplaces: Purdue University
- Doctoral advisor: Oscar Zariski

Shreeram Shankar Abhyankar (22 July 1930 – 2 November 2012) was an Indian American mathematician known for his contributions to algebraic geometry. At the time of his death, he held the Marshall Distinguished Professor of Mathematics Chairman at Purdue University, and was also a professor of computer science and industrial engineering. He is known for Abhyankar's conjecture of finite group theory. His later research was in the area of computational and algorithmic algebraic geometry.

== Career ==
Abhyankar was born during the late British Raj, 22 July 1930, in a Marathi Chitpavan Brahmin family in Ujjain, Madhya Pradesh, India. He earned his B.Sc. from the Royal Institute of Science of University of Mumbai in 1951, his M.A. at Harvard University in 1952, and his Ph.D. at Harvard in 1955. His thesis, written under the direction of Oscar Zariski, was titled Local uniformization on algebraic surfaces over modular ground fields. Before going to Purdue, he was an associate professor of mathematics at Cornell University and Johns Hopkins University.

Abhyankar was appointed the Marshall Distinguished Professor of Mathematics at Purdue in 1967. His research topics include algebraic geometry (particularly resolution of singularities, a field in which he made significant progress over fields of finite characteristic), commutative algebra, local algebra, valuation theory, theory of functions of several complex variables, quantum electrodynamics, circuit theory, invariant theory, combinatorics, computer-aided design, and robotics. He popularized the Jacobian conjecture.

== Death ==
Abhyankar died of a heart condition on 2 November 2012 at his residence near Purdue University.

== Selected publications ==
- Abhyankar, Shreeram S. (1967). "Local rings of high embedding dimension". American Journal of Mathematics. 89 (4): 1073–1077. doi:10.2307/2373418. JSTOR 2373418. MR 0220723.
- Abhyankar, Shreeram S. (1977). Lectures on expansion techniques in algebraic geometry. Tata Institute of Fundamental Research Lectures on Mathematics and Physics. Vol. 57. Notes by Balwant Singh. Tata Institute of Fundamental Research. MR 0542446.
- Abhyankar, Shreeram S.; Moh, Tzuong-Tsieng (1975). "Embeddings of the line in the plane". Journal für die reine und angewandte Mathematik. 276: 148–166. MR 0379502.
- Zariski, Oscar (1971). Algebraic surfaces. Ergebnisse der Mathematik und ihrer Grenzgebiete. Vol. 61. With appendices by Shreeram S. Abhyankar, Joseph Lipman, and David Mumford (Second supplemented ed.). New York–Heidelberg: Springer-Verlag. MR 0469915.

== Honours ==
Abhyankar has won numerous awards and honours.

- Abhyankar received the Herbert Newby McCoy Award from Purdue University in 1973 .
- Fellow of the Indian Academy of Sciences
- Editorial board member of the Indian Journal of Pure and Applied Mathematics
- Chauvenet Prize from the Mathematical Association of America (1978)
- Honorary Doctorate Degree (Docteur Honoris Causa) by the University of Angers in France (29 October 1998)
- Fellow of the American Mathematical Society (2012)

== Bhaskaracharya Pratishthana ==
Shreeram Shankar Abhyankar
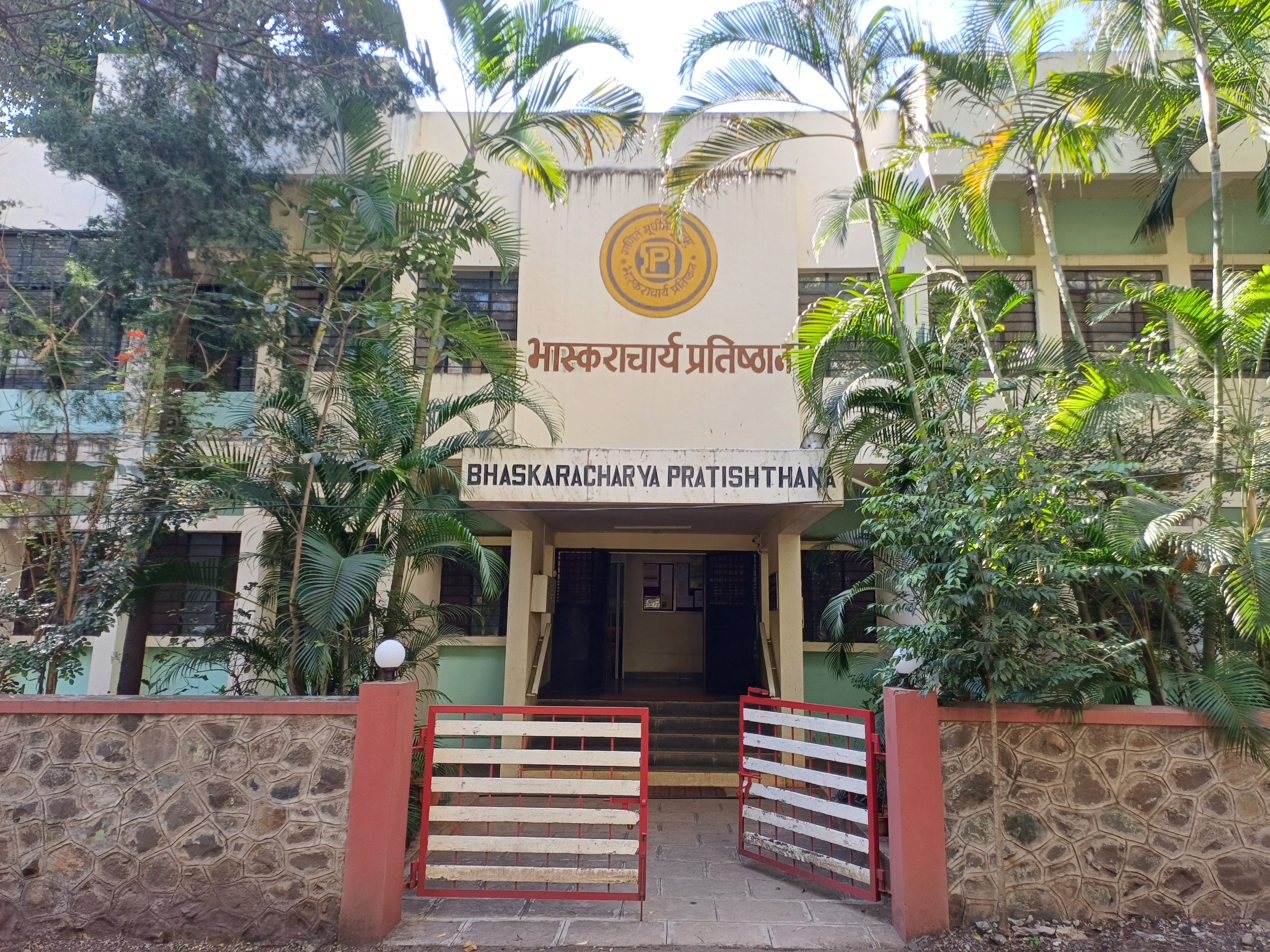
- Founder: Shreeram Abhyankar
- Established: 1976
- Location: Erandwane, Pune, Maharashtra, India
- Website: www.bprim.org

Bhaskaracharya Pratishthana is a research and education institute for mathematics in Pune, India, founded by Abhyankar. The institute is named after the great ancient Indian Mathematician Bhaskaracharya (Born in 1114 A.D). It was founded in 1976. It has researchers working in many areas of mathematics, particularly in algebra and number theory.

Since 1992, the Pratishthan has also been a recognized center for conducting Regional Mathematics Olympiad (RMO) under the National Board for Higher Mathematics (NBHM) for Maharashtra and Goa Region.

Pratishthana publishes the mathematics periodical Bona Mathematica and has published texts in higher and Olympiad mathematics. Besides this the Pratishthan holds annual / biennial conferences/ Workshops in some research areas in higher mathematics attended by Indian/Foreign scholars and Professors. The Pratishthan has organized a number of workshops for research students and college teachers under the aegis of NBHM/NCM. The National Board for Higher Mathematics has greatly helped Pratishthan to enrich its library. The Department of Atomic Energy and the Mathematics Department of S. P. Pune University have rendered active co-operation in holding conferences/workshops.

It also conducts the BMTSC exam which is a school-level mathematics competition for students studying in the 5th and the 6th grade. The objectives of the competition are listed below: 1. Identify good students of mathematics at an early age. 2. A pre Olympiad type competition. 3. To enhance Mathematical ability and logical thinking. 4. Nurture programs for successful students to improve their ability.

== See also ==
- Abhyankar's conjecture
- Abhyankar's inequality
- Abhyankar's lemma
- Abhyankar–Moh theorem
