= Alexander Skopin =

Russian mathematician (1927–2003)

Alexander Ivanovich Skopin (Александр Иванович Скопин) (1927–2003) was a Russian mathematician known for his contributions to abstract algebra.

== Biography ==
Skopin was born on October 22, 1927, in Leningrad, the son of Ivan Alexandrovich Skopin, who was himself also a number theorist and a student of Ivan Matveyevich Vinogradov, and who died in the Siege of Leningrad. After the war, Alexander Skopin studied at Leningrad University, where he was a student of Dmitry Faddeev; From that point to the end of his life, he worked as a researcher at the Steklov Mathematical Institute (where he was scientific secretary from the mid-1960s to the early 1970s) and taught algebra at the St. Petersburg University. He died on September 15, 2003, in St. Petersburg.

== Research ==
Skopin's student work was in abstract algebra, and concerned upper central series of groups and extensions of fields. In the 1970s, Skopin received a second doctorate concerning the application of computer algebra systems to group theory. From that point onward he used computational methods extensively in his research, which focussed on lower central series of Burnside groups. He related this problem to problems in other areas of mathematics including linear algebra and topological sorting of graphs.
