= Complex line =

In mathematics, a complex line is a one-dimensional affine subspace of a vector space over the complex numbers. A common point of confusion is that while a complex line has complex dimension one over C (hence the term "line"), it has ordinary dimension two over the real numbers R, and is topologically equivalent to a real plane, not a real line.

The "complex plane" commonly refers to the graphical representation of the complex line on the real plane, and is thus generally synonymous with the complex line, not the complex coordinate plane.

== See also ==
- Algebraic geometry
- Complex vector
- Riemann sphere
