= Applications of artificial intelligence =

Artificial intelligence (AI) and its subfields have been used in applications throughout industry and academia. Machine learning has been used for various scientific and commercial purposes, including language translation, image recognition, decision-making, credit scoring, and e-commerce. Since the 2020s, massive advancements have been made in the field of generative AI (GenAI) as a result of the 2017 inception of Transformer Model architecture. GenAI has the ability to create text, images, voice, music, videos, and other forms of data from chat-based prompting.

== Agriculture ==
In agriculture, AI has been proposed as a way for farmers to identify areas that need irrigation, fertilization, or pesticide treatments to increase yields, thereby improving efficiency. AI has been used to attempt to classify livestock pig call emotions, automate greenhouses, detect diseases and pests, and optimize irrigation.

== Architecture and design ==
AI in architecture is the use of AI in automation, design, and planning in the architectural process or in assisting human skills in the field of architecture.

AI has been used by some architects for design, and has been proposed as a way to automate planning and routine tasks in the field.

== Business ==
A 2019 study found that generative AI increased productivity by 15% in contact centers. Another 2019 study found it increased productivity by up to 40% for writing tasks. An August 2025 review by MIT found that of surveyed companies, 95% did not report any improvement in revenue from the use of AI. In September 2025, a Harvard Business Review article described how increased use of AI does not automatically lead to increases in revenue or actual productivity. Referring to "AI generated work content that masquerades as good work, but lacks the substance to meaningfully advance a given task", the article coined the term workslop. Per studies done in collaboration with the Stanford Social Media Lab, workslop does not improve productivity and undermines trust and collaboration among colleagues.

In telehealth, agentic AI is reportedly facilitating the creation of large business models (millions in annual profit) with 1–2 employees, such as MEDVi, which as of August 2025 only had 2 employees and ~$75M in annual profit for GLP-1 weight-loss telehealth services.

== Computer science ==
=== Programming assistance ===
==== AI-assisted software development ====
AI can be used for real-time code completion, chat, and automated test generation. These tools are typically integrated with editors and IDEs as plugins. AI-assisted software development systems differ in functionality, quality, speed, and approach to privacy. Creating software primarily via AI is known as "vibe coding". Code created or suggested by AI can be incorrect or inefficient. The use of AI-assisted coding can potentially speed-up software development, but it can also slow-down the process by creating more work when debugging and testing. The rush to prematurely adopt AI technology can also incur additional technical debt. AI also requires additional consideration and careful review for cybersecurity, since AI coding software is trained on a wide range of code of inconsistent quality and often replicates poor practices.

==== Neural network design ====
AI can be used to create other AIs. For example, around November 2017, Google's AutoML project to evolve new neural net topologies created NASNet, a system optimized for ImageNet and POCO F1. NASNet's performance exceeded all previously published performance on ImageNet.

==== Quantum computing ====
Research and development of quantum computers has been performed with machine learning algorithms. For example, there is a prototype, photonic, quantum memristive device for neuromorphic computers (NC)/artificial neural networks and NC-using quantum materials with some variety of potential neuromorphic computing-related applications. The use of quantum machine learning for quantum simulators has been proposed for solving physics and chemistry problems.

=== Integrated circuit design ===
Artificial intelligence and machine learning are used in electronic design automation to assist with integrated circuit design, including floorplanning, placement, routing, functional verification, and optimization of power, performance, and chip area.

=== Historical contributions ===
AI researchers have created many tools to solve difficult problems in computer science. Many of their inventions have been adopted by mainstream computer science and are no longer considered AI. The following were originally developed in AI laboratories:

- Time sharing
- Interactive interpreters
- Graphical user interfaces and the computer mouse
- Rapid application development environments
- The linked list data structure
- Automatic storage management
- Symbolic programming
- Functional programming
- Dynamic programming
- Object-oriented programming
- Optical character recognition
- Constraint satisfaction

== Customer service ==
=== Human resources ===
AI programs have been used in hiring processes to screen resumes and rank candidates based on their qualifications, predict a candidate's likelihood of success in a given role, and automate repetitive communication tasks using chatbots. Studies on these programs have identified tendencies for gender bias, favoring male names and male-coded characteristics, as well as bias against disabled candidates and racial minorities.

=== Online and telephone customer service ===
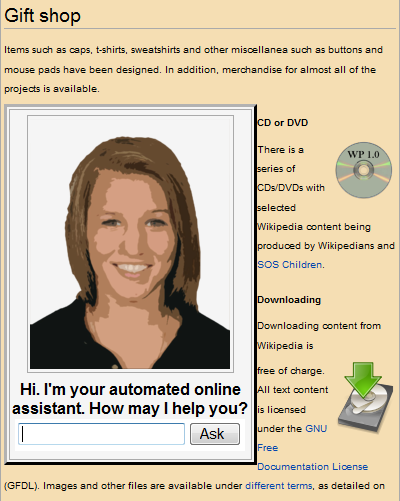
An automated online assistant providing customer service on a web page

AI underlies avatars (automated online assistants) on web pages. It can reduce operation and training costs. In 2016, Pypestream automated customer service for its mobile application to streamline communication with customers.

A Google app analyzes language and converts speech into text. The platform can identify angry customers through their language and respond appropriately. Amazon uses a chatbot for customer service that can perform tasks like checking the status of an order, cancelling orders, offering refunds, and connecting the customer with a human representative.

=== Hospitality ===
In the hospitality industry, AI is used to reduce repetitive tasks, analyze trends, interact with guests, and predict customer needs. AI hotel services come in the form of a chatbot, application, virtual voice assistant, and service robots.

== Education ==
In educational institutions, AI has been used to automate routine tasks such as attendance tracking, grading, and marking. AI tools have also been used to monitor student progress and analyze learning behaviors, with the goal of facilitating timely interventions for students facing academic challenges.

As of 2025 and 2026, respectively, about 80% of high school students and nearly 60% of college students were also using AI. Some schools and universities proposed restrictions on students' usage due to issues with increased cheating, over-reliance on AI tools, and widening of digital inequities.

== Energy and environment ==
=== Energy system ===
The U.S. Department of Energy wrote in an April 2024 report that AI may have applications in modeling power grids, reviewing federal permits with large language models (LLMs), predicting levels of renewable energy production, and improving the planning process for electrical vehicle charging networks. Other studies have suggested that machine learning can be used for energy consumption prediction and scheduling (e.g., to help with renewable energy intermittency management).

=== Environmental decision-making and monitoring ===
The late 1980s and early 1990s saw expert systems used in technical and environmental domains. For example, researchers built a fishway design advisor to recommend fish passage structures under varying hydraulic and biological conditions using the VP-Expert shell. Transportation researchers applied the same shell to balance airport capacity with noise-mitigation plans. In agriculture, a potato insect expert system (PIES) supported pest management decisions for Colorado potato beetle. The U.S. Environmental Protection Agency's CORMIX system for modeling pollutant discharges combined rules with Fortran hydrodynamic models.

Autonomous ships that monitor the ocean, AI-driven satellite data analysis, passive acoustics or remote sensing and other applications of environmental monitoring make use of machine learning. For example, "Global Plastic Watch" is an AI-based satellite-monitoring platform for analysis/tracking of plastic waste sites to help with the prevention of plastic pollution—primarily ocean pollution—by helping identify who mismanages plastic waste and where dumping into oceans occurs.

=== Early-warning systems ===
Machine learning can be used to spot early warning signs of disasters and environmental issues, possibly including natural pandemics, earthquakes, landslides, heavy rainfall, long-term water supply vulnerability, tipping-points of ecosystem collapse, cyanobacterial bloom outbreaks, and droughts.

=== Economic and social challenges ===
In 2023, the University of Southern California launched the Center for Artificial Intelligence in Society, with the goal of using AI to address problems such as homelessness. Stanford University researchers use AI to analyze satellite images to identify high poverty areas.

== Entertainment and media ==
=== Media ===
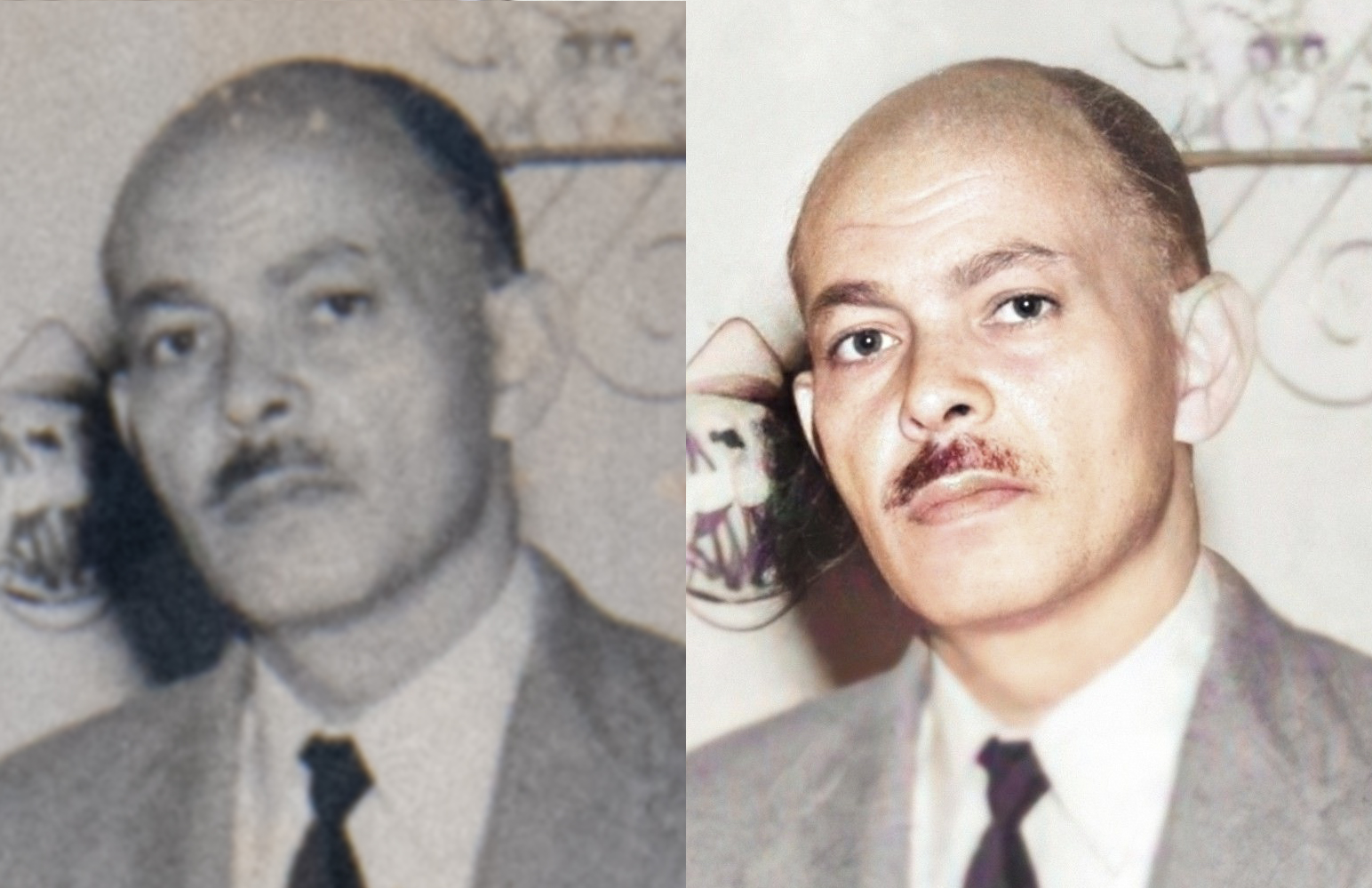
Image restoration

AI applications analyze media content such as movies, TV programs, advertisement videos, and user-generated content. The solutions often involve computer vision.

Typical scenarios include the analysis of images using object recognition or facial recognition techniques, or the analysis of video for recognizing scenes, objects, or faces. AI-based media analysis can facilitate media search, the creation of descriptive keywords for content, content policy monitoring (such as verifying the suitability of content for a particular TV viewing time), speech to text for archival or other purposes, and the detection of logos, products, or celebrity faces for ad placement.

- Motion interpolation
- Pixel-art scaling algorithms
- Image scaling
- Image restoration
- Photo colorization
- Film restoration and video upscaling
- Photo tagging
- Text-to-image models (such as DALL-E, Midjourney, and Stable Diffusion)
- Image to video
- Text to video (such as Make-A-Video from Meta, Imagen video and Phenaki from Google)
- Text to music with AI models (such as MusicLM)
- Text to speech (such as ElevenLabs and 15.ai)
- Motion capture

=== Deep-fakes ===
Deep-fakes can be used for comedic purposes but are better known for fake news and hoaxes. Deepfakes can portray individuals in harmful or compromising situations, causing significant reputational damage and emotional distress—especially when the content is defamatory or violates personal ethics. While defamation and false light laws offer some recourse, their focus on false statements rather than fabricated images or videos often leaves victims with limited legal protection and a challenging burden of proof. Audio deepfakes and AI software capable of detecting deep-fakes and cloning human voices have also been developed.

In January 2016, the Horizon 2020 program financed the InVID Project to help journalists and researchers detect fake documents, made available as browser plugins.

In September 2018, U.S. Senator Mark Warner proposed penalizing social media companies that allow sharing of deep-fake documents on their platforms. In 2018, Darius Afchar and Vincent Nozick found a way to detect faked content by analyzing the mesoscopic properties of video frames. DARPA gave $68M to work on deep-fake detection.

=== Video surveillance analysis and manipulated media detection ===
AI for video surveillance utilizes computer software programs that analyze audio and images from video surveillance cameras to recognize humans, vehicles, objects, and events. Security contractors program the software to define restricted areas within the camera's view (such as a fenced-off area, a parking lot but not sidewalk, or a public street outside the lot) and program for times of day (such as after the close of a business) for the property being protected by the camera surveillance. The AI sends an alert if it detects a trespasser breaking the "rule" set that no person is allowed in that area during that time of day.

AI algorithms have been used to detect deepfake videos.

=== Video production ===
AI is also starting to be used in video production, with tools and software being developed that utilize generative AI to create new video, or alter existing video. Examples of these tools include DALL-E, Midjourney, and Runway. In 2023, Waymark Studios utilized the tools offered by both DALL-E and Midjourney to create a fully AI generated film called The Frost. Waymark is experimenting with using AI tools to generate advertisements and commercials for companies in seconds. Yves Bergquist, a director of the AI & Neuroscience in Media Project at USC's Entertainment Technology Center, says post production crews in Hollywood are already using generative AI, and predicts that in the future more companies will embrace this new technology.

=== Music ===
AI has been used to compose music of various genres.

David Cope created an AI called Emily Howell that became well known in the field of algorithmic computer music. The algorithm behind Emily Howell is registered as a US patent.

In 2012, AI Iamus created the first complete classical album.

AIVA (Artificial Intelligence Virtual Artist), composes symphonic music, mainly classical music for film scores. It became the first virtual composer to be recognized by a musical professional association.

Melomics creates computer-generated music for stress and pain relief.

The Watson Beat uses reinforcement learning and deep belief networks to compose music on a simple seed input melody and a select style. The software was open sourced, and musicians such as Taryn Southern collaborated with the project.

South Korean singer Hayeon's debut song, "Eyes on You", was composed using AI which was supervised by real composers, including NUVO.

=== Writing and reporting ===
Narrative Science sells computer-generated news and reports. It summarizes sporting events based on statistical data from a game. It also creates financial reports and real estate analyses. Automated Insights generates personalized recaps and previews for Yahoo Sports Fantasy Football.

Yseop uses AI to turn structured data into natural language comments and recommendations. It writes financial reports, executive summaries, and personalized sales or marketing documents in multiple languages, including English, Spanish, French, and German.

TALESPIN made up stories similar to the fables of Aesop. The program started with a set of characters who wanted to achieve certain goals. Mark Riedl and Vadim Bulitko asserted that the essence of storytelling was experience management, or "how to balance the need for a coherent story progression with user agency, which is often at odds".

While AI storytelling focuses on story generation (character and plot), story communication also received attention. In 2002, researchers developed an architectural framework for narrative prose generation. They faithfully reproduced text variety and complexity on stories such as Little Red Riding Hood. In 2016, a Japanese AI co-wrote a short story and almost won a literary prize.

South Korean company Hanteo Global uses a journalism bot to write articles.

Literary authors are also exploring uses of AI. An example is David Jhave Johnston's work ReRites (2017–2019), where the poet created a daily rite of editing the poetic output of a neural network to create a series of performances and publications.

==== Sports writing ====
In 2010, AI used baseball statistics to automatically generate news articles. This was launched by The Big Ten Network using software from Narrative Science.

After being unable to cover every Minor League Baseball game with a large team, Associated Press collaborated with Automated Insights in 2016 to create game recaps that were automated by AI.

UOL in Brazil expanded the use of AI in its writing. In addition to generating news stories, they programmed the AI to include commonly searched words on Google.

El Pais, a Spanish news site, allows users to make comments on news articles. They use the Perspective API to moderate these comments and if the software deems a comment to contain toxic language, the commenter must modify it to publish it.

A local Dutch media group used AI to create automatic coverage of amateur soccer, set to cover 60,000 games in a single season. NDC partnered with United Robots to create the algorithm.

In 2023, Lede AI was used to take scores from high school football games and generate stories for the local newspaper. It was met with criticism from readers, who mocked the robotic diction and called out the publishing company, Gannett, on social media. Gannett has since halted their used of Lede AI.

=== Wikipedia ===
Some editors of Wikimedia projects use AI and machine learning programs to edit existing articles or create new ones.

Some applications of AI, like using large language models (LLMs) to create new articles from scratch, have been more controversial than others for the Wikipedia community. In August 2025, English Wikipedia adopted a policy that allowed editors to nominate suspected LLM-generated articles for speedy deletion. Then, a March 2026 decision prohibited the use of LLMs to generate or rewrite article content, with exceptions for copyediting one's own writing and machine translation from another language's Wikipedia.

Wikipedia has also been a significant source of training data for some of the earliest AI projects. This has received mixed reactions, including concern about companies not citing Wikipedia when relying on it to answer a question as well as Wikipedia's increased costs from data scraping.

Millions of its articles have been edited by bots, which however are usually not AI software. Many AI platforms use Wikipedia data, mainly for training machine learning applications. There is research and development of various AI applications for Wikipedia, such as for identifying outdated sentences, detecting covert vandalism or recommending articles and tasks to new editors.

Machine translation has also been used for translating Wikipedia articles and could play a larger role in creating, updating, expanding, and generally improving articles in the future. A content translation tool allows editors of some Wikipedias to more easily translate articles across several select languages.

=== Video games ===
In video games, AI is routinely used to generate behavior in non-player characters (NPCs). In addition, AI is used for pathfinding. Games with less typical AI include the AI director of Left 4 Dead (2008) and the neuroevolutionary training of platoons in Supreme Commander 2 (2010).

In the 21st century, AIs have beaten human players in many games, including chess (Deep Blue), Jeopardy! (Watson), Go (AlphaGo), poker (Pluribus and Cepheus), E-sports (StarCraft), and general game playing (AlphaZero and MuZero).

Kuki AI is a set of chatbots and other apps which were designed for entertainment and as a marketing tool.

=== Visual images ===
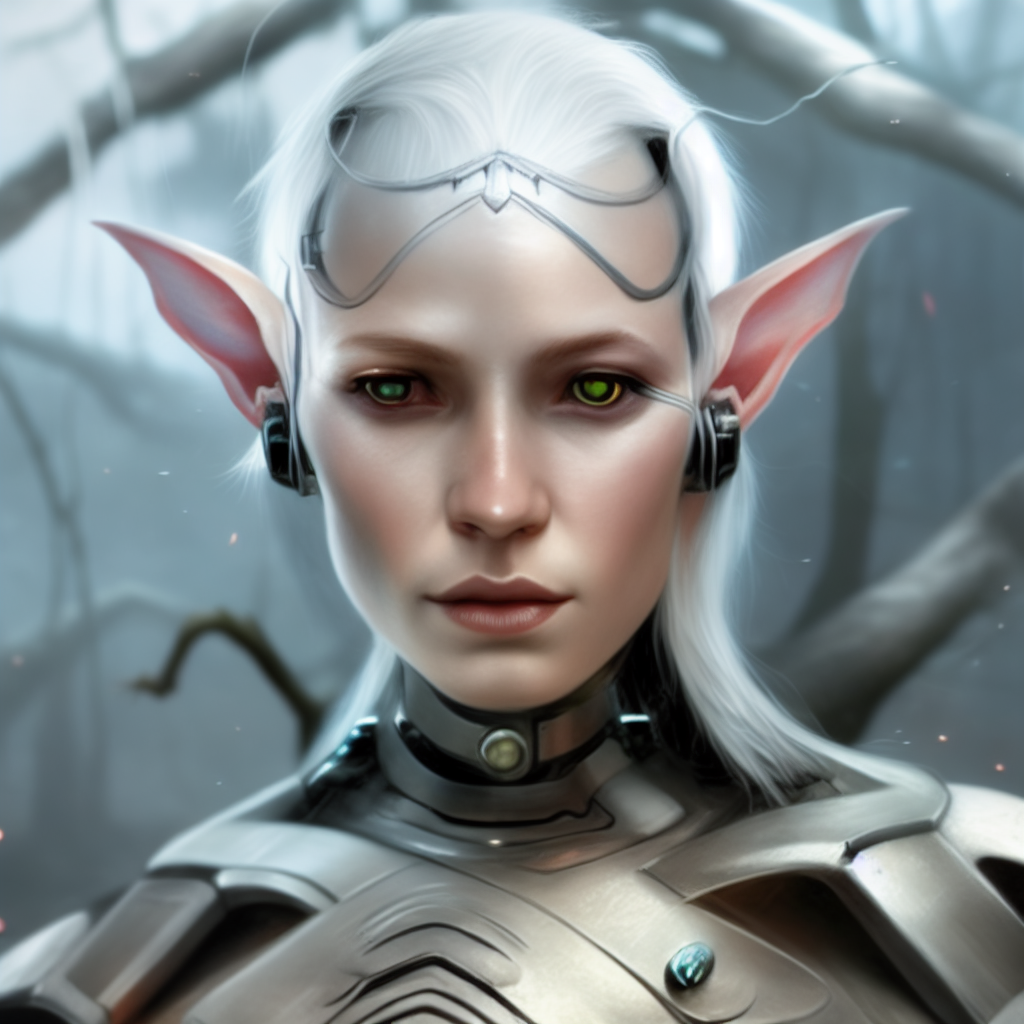
A "cyborg elf" generated by Stable Diffusion

The first AI art program, AARON, was developed by Harold Cohen in 1968 with the goal of being able to code the act of drawing. It started by creating simple black and white drawings, and later to painting using special brushes and dyes chosen by the program without mediation from Cohen.

AI platforms such as DALL-E, Stable Diffusion, Imagen, and Midjourney have been used for generating visual images from inputs such as text or other images. Some AI tools allow users to input images and output changed versions, such as to display an object or product in different environments. AI image models can also attempt to replicate the specific styles of artists, and can add visual complexity to rough sketches.

AI has been used to generate quantitative analysis of existing digital art collections. Two computational methods, close reading and distant viewing, are typical approaches used to analyze digitized art. While distant viewing includes the analysis of large collections, close reading involves one piece of artwork.

=== Computer animation ===
In 2023, Netflix of Japan's usage of AI to generate background images for the short The Dog & the Boy was met with backlash online.

== Finance ==
Banks use AI to organize operations for bookkeeping, investing in stocks, and managing properties. AI can adapt to changes during non-business hours.

=== Expert systems ===
In the 1980s, AI started to become prominent in finance as expert systems were commercialized. For example, Dupont created 100 expert systems, which helped them save almost $10M per year. One of the first systems was the Pro-trader expert system that predicted the 87-point drop in the Dow Jones Industrial Average in 1986.

An early expert system to help with financial plans was PlanPowerm and Client Profiling System, launched by Applied Expert Systems (APEX) in 1986. It helped create personal financial plans for people.

In 1987 Security Pacific National Bank's fraud prevention task-force began using an expert system to counter the unauthorized use of debit cards.

=== Trading and investment ===
The use of AI in applications such as online trading and decision-making has changed major economic theories. For example, AI-based buying and selling platforms estimate personalized demand and supply curves, thus enabling individualized pricing. AI systems reduce information asymmetry in the market and thus make markets more efficient. The application of AI in the financial industry can help alleviate financing constraints of non-state-owned enterprises, especially for smaller and more innovative enterprises.

Large financial institutions use AI to assist with their investment practices. BlackRock's AI engine, Aladdin, is used both within the company and by clients to help with investment decisions. Its functions include the use of natural language processing to analyze text such as news, broker reports, and social media feeds. It then gauges the sentiment on the companies mentioned and assigns a score. Banks such as UBS and Deutsche Bank use SQREEM (Sequential Quantum Reduction and Extraction Model) to mine data to develop consumer profiles and match them with wealth management products.

=== Underwriting ===
Online lender Upstart uses machine learning for underwriting. ZestFinance's Zest Automated Machine Learning (ZAML) platform is used for credit underwriting. It uses machine learning to analyze data, including purchase transactions and how a customer fills out a form, to score borrowers. It can also assign credit scores to those with limited credit histories.

=== Audit ===
AI makes continuous auditing possible. Potential benefits include reducing audit risk, increasing the level of assurance, and reducing audit duration. Continuous auditing with AI allows real-time monitoring and reporting of financial activities and provides businesses with timely insights that can lead to quick decision-making.

=== Anti–money laundering ===
In 1993, FinCEN Artificial Intelligence System (FAIS) was launched. It was able to review over 200,000 transactions per week, and over two years, it helped identify 400 potential cases of money laundering equal to $1 billion. These expert systems were later replaced by machine learning systems.

AI software, such as LaundroGraph which uses contemporary suboptimal datasets, could be used for anti–money laundering (AML).

=== Regulatory developments in the EU ===
In the European Union, the Artificial Intelligence Act (Regulation (EU) 2024/1689) classifies several finance‑sector uses of AI as "high‑risk", including systems used to evaluate the creditworthiness of natural persons or to establish a credit score and AI used for risk assessment and pricing in life or health insurance. These systems must meet requirements on risk management, data governance, technical documentation and logging, transparency, and human oversight. The Act's obligations are phased in: prohibitions and AI‑literacy rules apply from 2 February 2025, governance and most GPAI duties from 2 August 2025, the bulk of obligations from 2 August 2026, and certain safety‑component high‑risk obligations from 2 August 2027.

== Health ==
=== Healthcare ===
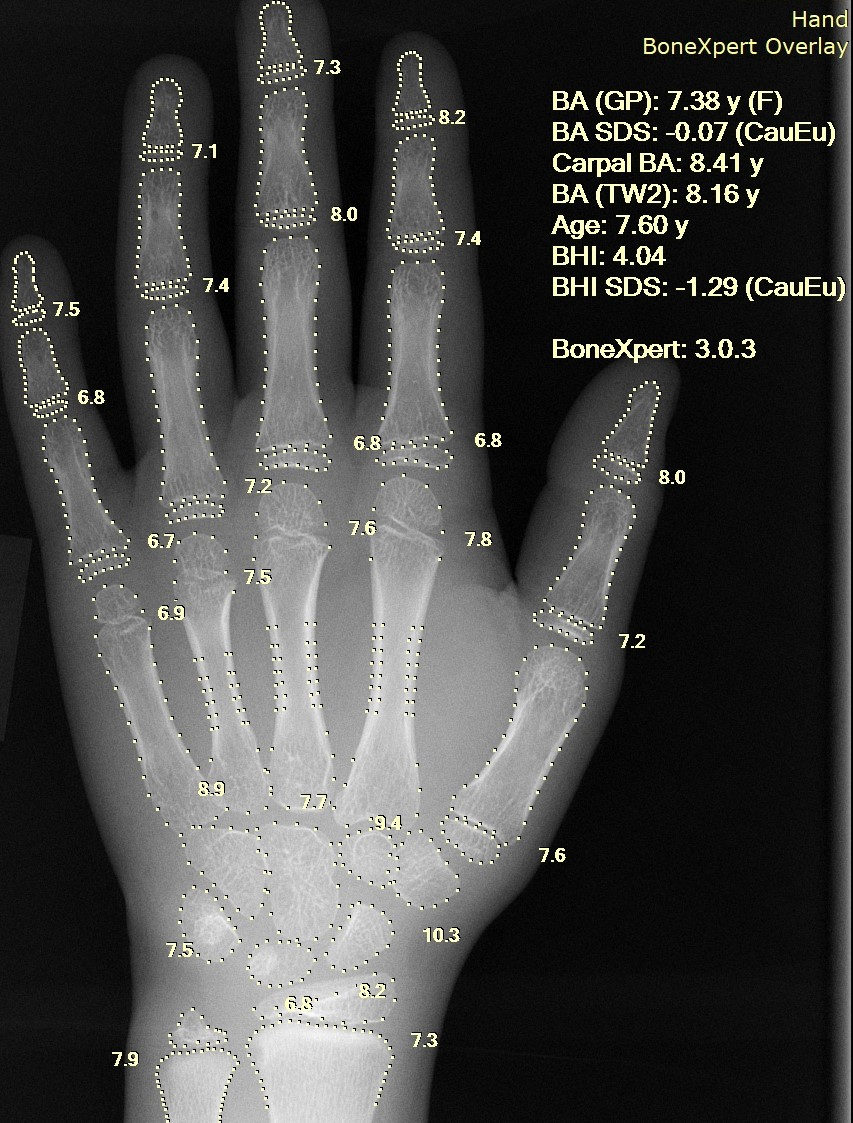
X-ray of a hand, with automatic calculation of bone age by a computer software

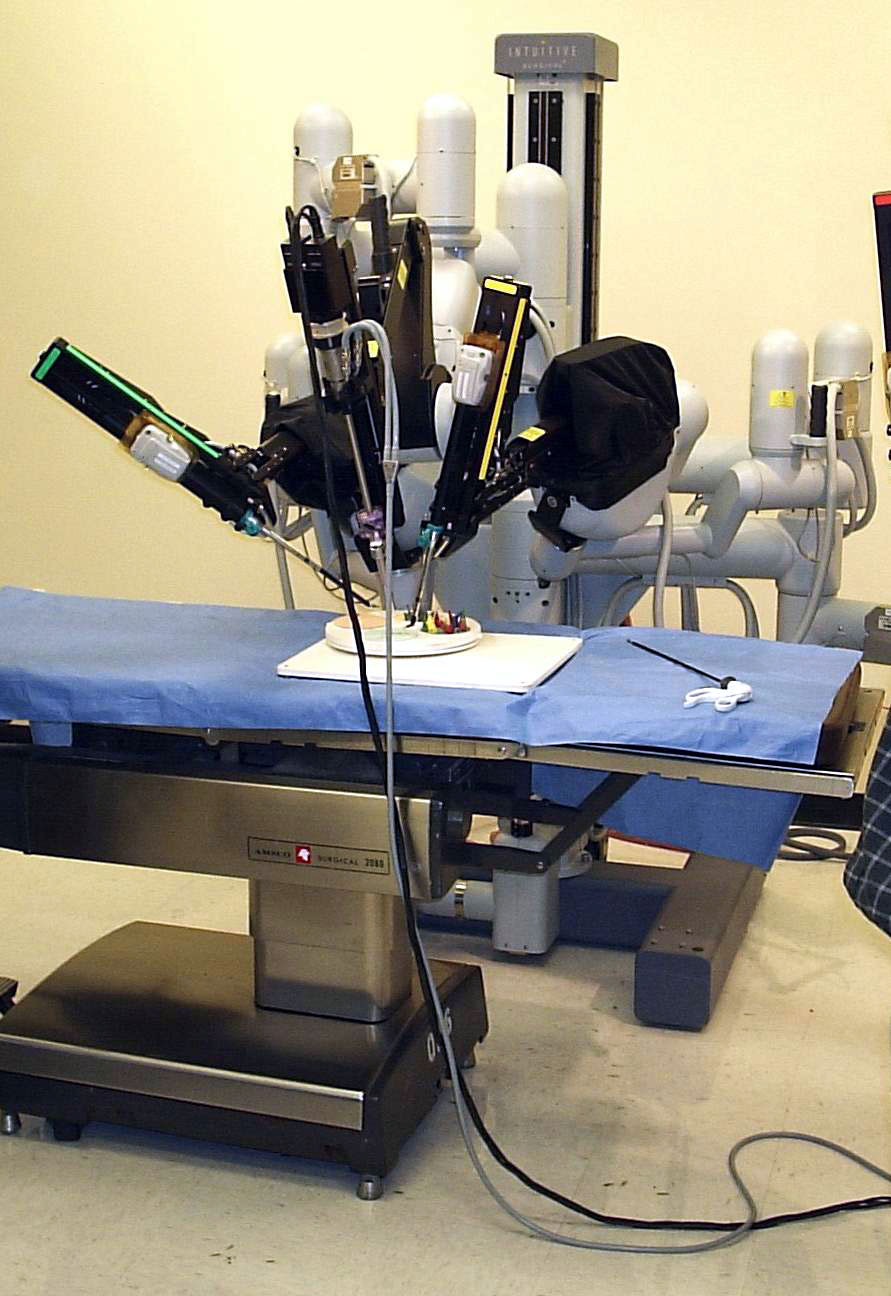
A patient-side surgical arm of Da Vinci Surgical System

AI in healthcare is often used for classification, such as to evaluate a CT scan or electrocardiogram or to identify high-risk patients for population health. Additional potential applications like robot-assisted surgery, virtual nursing assistants, and dosage error reductions could create billions in annual savings for U.S. health care.

For certain disorders and diseases, AI algorithms can aid in diagnosis, recommended treatments, outcome prediction, and patient progress tracking. Early detection of diseases like cancer is made possible by AI algorithms, which diagnose diseases by analyzing complex sets of medical data. For example, Microsoft's AI project Hanover helps doctors choose cancer treatments from among the more than 800 medicines and vaccines. Studies have shown AI capable of identifying skin cancers and diagnosing eye conditions, similar to an ophthalmologist, and recommending treatment referrals via transfer learning. Another project monitors multiple high-risk patients by asking each patient questions based on data acquired from doctor/patient interactions.

Artificial neural networks are used as clinical decision support systems for medical diagnosis, such as in concept processing technology in electronic medical record (EMR) software.

Other healthcare tasks thought suitable for an AI that are in development include:

- Screening
- Companion robots for elder care
- Drug creation (e.g. by identifying candidate drugs and by using existing drug screening data such as in life extension research)
- Clinical training
- Identifying genomic pathogen signatures of novel pathogens or identifying pathogens via physics-based fingerprints (including pandemic pathogens)
- Helping link genes to their functions, otherwise analyzing genes and identification of novel biological targets
- Help development of biomarkers
- Help tailor therapies to individuals in personalized medicine/precision medicine

=== Workplace health and safety ===
AI-enabled chatbots decrease the need for humans to perform basic call center tasks, and machine learning in sentiment analysis can spot fatigue to prevent overwork.

Decision support systems can potentially prevent industrial disasters and make disaster response more efficient. For manual workers in material handling, predictive analytics has been proposed to reduce musculoskeletal injury.

AI can attempt to process workers' compensation claims. AI has been proposed for detection of accident near misses, which are underreported.

=== Biochemistry ===
Machine learning has been used for drug design, drug discovery and development, drug repurposing, improving pharmaceutical productivity, and clinical trials.

Computer-planned syntheses via computational reaction networks, described as a platform that combines "computational synthesis with AI algorithms to predict molecular properties", has been used in drug-syntheses, and developing routes for recycling 200 industrial waste chemicals into important drugs and agrochemicals (chemical synthesis design). It has also been used to explore the origins of life on Earth.

Deep learning has been used with databases for the development of a 46-day process to design, synthesize and test a drug which inhibits enzymes of a particular gene, DDR1. DDR1 is involved in cancers and fibrosis which is one reason for the high-quality datasets that enabled these results.

The AI program AlphaFold 2 can determine the 3D structure of a (folded) protein in hours rather than the months required by earlier automated approaches and was used to provide the likely structures of all proteins in the human body and essentially all proteins known to science (more than 200M).

== Language processing ==
=== Language translation ===
Speech translation technology attempts to convert one language into another. This could potentially reduce language barriers in global commerce and cross-cultural exchange, enabling speakers of various languages to communicate. AI has been used to automatically translate spoken language and textual content in products like Microsoft Translator, Google Translate, and DeepL Translator. Also, research and development are in progress to decode and conduct animal communication.

Meaning is conveyed not only by text, but also through usage and context (see semantics and pragmatics). As a result, the two primary categorization approaches for machine translations are statistical machine translation (SMT) and neural machine translations (NMTs). The old method of performing translation was to use statistical methodology to forecast the best probable output with specific algorithms. However, with NMT, the approach employs dynamic algorithms to achieve better translations based on context.

== Law and government ==
=== Government ===
AI facial recognition systems are used for mass surveillance, notably in China. In 2019, Bengaluru, India deployed AI-managed traffic signals that uses cameras to monitor traffic density and adjust signal timing based on the interval needed to clear traffic.

=== Law ===
==== Legal analysis ====
AI is a mainstay of law-related professions. Algorithms and machine learning do some tasks previously done by entry-level lawyers. While its use is common, it is not expected to replace most work done by lawyers in the near future.

The electronic discovery industry uses machine learning to reduce manual searching.

==== Law enforcement and legal proceedings ====
Law enforcement has begun using facial recognition systems (FRS) to identify suspects from visual data. FRS results have proven to be more accurate when compared to eyewitness results, as well as better at identifying individuals when video clarity and visibility are low compared to human participants.

COMPAS is a commercial system used by U.S. courts to assess the likelihood of recidivism. One concern relates to algorithmic bias, AI programs may become biased after processing data that exhibits bias. ProPublica claims that the average COMPAS-assigned recidivism risk level of black defendants is significantly higher than that of white defendants.

In 2019, the city of Hangzhou, China established a pilot program AI-based Internet Court to adjudicate disputes related to ecommerce and internet-related intellectual property claims. Parties appear before the court via videoconference and AI evaluates the evidence presented and applies relevant legal standards.

Italian police combat art theft by using AI software to detect stolen items, such as paintings.

== Manufacturing ==
=== Sensors ===
AI has been combined with digital spectrometry by IdeaCuria Inc., to enable applications such as at-home water quality monitoring.

=== Toys and games ===
In the 1990s, early AI tools controlled toys like Aibo, a domestic robot in the form of a robotic dog with intelligent features and autonomy. In the mid-2010s, Mattel's Hello Barbie could "understand" conversations, give intelligent responses, and remember.

AI in toys could offer personalized learning. However, in May 2026, after early tests to see how toddlers interact with AI, researchers called for tighter regulation on AI-powered toys. Similarly, nonprofit organization Common Sense Media warned against children under five using AI.

=== Oil and gas ===
Oil and gas companies have used AI tools to automate functions, foresee equipment issues, and increase oil and gas output.

== Mathematics ==
AI tools have been used to translate mathematical proofs into formal proofs to automatically verify them.

=== Automated theorem proving ===
Automated theorem proving (ATP), also known as automated deduction, is a subfield of automated reasoning and mathematical logic dealing with proving mathematical theorems by computer programs. Automated reasoning over mathematical proof was a major motivating factor for the development of computer science.

=== Computational geometry ===
AlphaGeometry is an AI program, developed by Google DeepMind, that can solve hard problems in Euclidean geometry. The system comprises a data-driven LLM and a rule-based symbolic engine (Deductive Database Arithmetic Reasoning). The program solved 25 geometry problems out of 30 from the International Mathematical Olympiad (IMO) under competition time limits—a performance almost as good as the average human gold medallist. For comparison, the previous AI program, called Wu's method, solved only 10 problems.

Traditional geometry programs are symbolic engines that rely exclusively on human-coded rules to generate rigorous proofs, which makes them lack flexibility in unusual situations. AlphaGeometry combines such a symbolic engine with a specialized LLM trained on synthetic data of geometrical proofs. When the symbolic engine doesn't find a formal and rigorous proof on its own, it solicits the LLM, which suggests a geometrical construct to move forward. It is unclear how applicable this method is to other domains of mathematics or reasoning, because symbolic engines rely on domain-specific rules and because of the need for synthetic data.

=== AI-assisted mathematical discovery ===
FunSearch, also developed by DeepMind, combines an LLM with automated evaluation to search for programs that can help solve mathematical problems. It has been applied to extremal combinatorics, including the cap set problem, and to online bin packing.

=== AI-assisted algorithm discovery ===
AI systems have also been used to search for improved algorithms and computational routines. AlphaTensor, AlphaDev, and AlphaEvolve have been applied to matrix multiplication algorithms, sorting routines, and broader scientific and algorithmic discovery.

== Military ==
Various countries are deploying AI military applications. Research is targeting intelligence collection and analysis, logistics, cyber operations, information operations, and semiautonomous and autonomous vehicles.

AI has been used in military operations in Iraq, Syria, Israel, and Ukraine.

== Robotics ==
AI is used in robotics to help robots perceive their surroundings, plan actions, navigate, manipulate objects, and adapt to changing environments. AI systems are used to connect sensor data with physical action, especially in systems operating outside controlled factory settings.

== Internet and e-commerce ==
=== Procurement and Sourcing ===
AI has been used in B2B sourcing and procurement. Academic literature and industry reports point out uses of AI for supplier evaluation and selection, predictive demand forecasting, automated contract and invoice processing, and supply-chain risk assessment. Machine learning, natural language processing, and robotic process automation are commonly used in procurement.

=== Web feeds and posts ===
Machine learning has been used for recommendation systems in determining which posts should show up in social media feeds. Various types of social media analysis also make use of machine learning, and there is research into its use for (semi-)automated tagging/enhancement/correction of online misinformation and related filter bubbles.

AI has been used to customize shopping options and personalize offers. Online gambling companies have used AI for targeting gamblers.

=== Virtual assistants and search ===
Intelligent personal assistants use AI to attempt to respond to natural language requests. Siri, released in 2010 for Apple smartphones, popularized the concept.

Bing Chat has used AI as part of its search engine.

=== Spam filtering ===
Machine learning can be used to combat spam, scams, and phishing. It can scrutinize the content of spam and phishing attacks to attempt to identify malicious elements. Some models built via machine learning algorithms have over 90% accuracy in distinguishing between spam and legitimate emails. These models can be refined using new data and evolving spam tactics. Machine learning also analyzes traits such as sender behavior, email header information, and attachment types, potentially enhancing spam detection.

=== Facial recognition and image labeling ===
AI has been used in facial recognition systems. Some examples are Apple's Face ID and Android's Face Unlock, which are used to secure mobile devices.

China has used facial recognition and AI technology in Xinjiang. In 2017, reporters visiting the region found surveillance cameras installed every hundred meters or so in several cities, as well as facial recognition checkpoints at areas like gas stations, shopping centers, and mosque entrances. Human rights groups have criticized the Chinese government for using AI facial recognition technology for use in political suppression.

The Netherlands has deployed facial recognition and AI technology since 2016. As of 2019, the database of the Dutch police contained over 2.2M pictures of 1.3M Dutch citizens. This accounts for about 8% of the population. In The Netherlands, face recognition is not used by the police on municipal CCTV.

Image labeling has been used by Google Image Labeler to detect products in photos and allow people to search based on a photo. Image labeling has also been demonstrated to generate speech to describe images to blind people.

== Scientific research ==
Researchers use artificial intelligence to analyse scientific data, predict protein structures and model physical systems. An evidence review for the European Commission identified challenges including accuracy, transparency and reproducibility.

AI research agents can help researchers search the literature and decide which hypotheses to test. In two studies published in 2026, Google DeepMind's Co-Scientist suggested new uses for existing drugs, and FutureHouse's Robin proposed drugs to test for dry age-related macular degeneration. The team tested selected drug candidates in the lab and sent the results back to Robin, which analysed the data and proposed a follow-up experiment.

=== Archaeology, history and imaging of sites ===
Machine learning can help to restore and attribute ancient texts. It can help to index texts, e.g., to enable better and easier searching and classification of fragments.

AI can also be used to investigate genomes to uncover genetic history, such as interbreeding between archaic and modern humans by which, e.g., the past existence of a ghost population, not Neanderthal or Denisovan, was inferred.

It can also be used for "non-invasive and non-destructive access to internal structures of archaeological remains".

=== Physics ===
A deep learning system was reported to learn intuitive physics from visual data (of virtual 3D environments) based on an unpublished approach inspired by studies of visual cognition in infants. Other researchers have developed a machine learning algorithm that could discover sets of basic variables of various physical systems and predict the systems' future dynamics from video recordings of their behavior. In the future, it may be possible that such can be used to automate the discovery of physical laws of complex systems.

=== Materials science ===
In November 2023, researchers at Google DeepMind and Lawrence Berkeley National Laboratory announced that AI system GNoME had documented over 2M new materials. GNoME uses deep learning techniques to examine potential material structures and identify stable inorganic crystal structures. The system's predictions were validated through autonomous robotic experiments, with a success rate of 71%. The data is publicly available through the Materials Project database.

=== Reverse engineering ===
Machine learning is used in diverse types of reverse engineering. For example, machine learning has been used to reverse engineer a composite material part, enabling unauthorized production of high quality parts, and for quickly understanding the behavior of malware. It can be used to reverse engineer AI models. It can also design components by engaging in a type of reverse engineering of not-yet existent virtual components, such as inverse molecular design for particular desired functionality or protein design for pre-specified functional sites. Biological network reverse engineering could model interactions in a human understandable way, e.g., based on time-series data of gene expression levels. The open-source Reverse Engineer Anything (REA) project connects AI coding agents with reverse-engineering tools such as Ghidra, Hopper, and IDA to inspect compiled binaries and trace application behavior.

=== Astronomy, space activities and ufology ===
AI is used in astronomy to analyze increasing amounts of available data and applications, mainly for "classification, regression, clustering, forecasting, generation, discovery, and the development of new scientific insights" e.g., for discovering exoplanets, forecasting solar activity, and distinguishing between signals and instrumental effects in gravitational wave astronomy. It could also be used for space exploration, including analysis of data from space missions, real-time science decisions of spacecraft, space debris avoidance, and more autonomous operation.

In the search for extraterrestrial intelligence (SETI), machine learning has been used in attempts to identify artificially generated electromagnetic waves in available data—such as real-time observations—and other technosignatures, e.g. via anomaly detection. In ufology, the SkyCAM-5 project headed by Prof. Hakan Kayal and the Galileo Project headed by Avi Loeb use machine learning to attempt to detect and classify types of UFOs. The Galileo Project also seeks to detect two further types of potential extraterrestrial technological signatures with the use of AI: 'Oumuamua-like interstellar objects, and non-manmade artificial satellites.

Machine learning can also be used to produce datasets of spectral signatures of molecules that may be involved in the atmospheric production or consumption of particular chemicals—such as phosphine possibly detected on Venus—which could prevent miss assignments and, if accuracy is improved, be used in future detection and identification of molecules on other planets.

=== Chemistry and biology ===
There is research about which types of computer-aided chemistry would benefit from machine learning. A deep learning AI-based process has been developed that uses genome databases to design novel proteins based on evolutionary algorithms. Machine learning has also been used for protein design with pre-specified functional sites, predicting molecular properties, and exploring large chemical/reaction spaces.

Using drug discovery AI algorithms, researchers generated 40,000 potential chemical weapon candidates, helping in the regulation of such chemicals to prevent synthesizing them for real harm.

Applications for machine learning in decoding human biology include helping to map gene expression patterns to functional activation patterns or identifying functional DNA motifs. It is widely used in genetic research. There is some use of machine learning in synthetic biology, disease biology, nanotechnology (e.g., nanostructured materials and bionanotechnology), and materials science.

== Security and surveillance ==
=== Cyber security ===
Cyber security companies have used neural networks, machine learning, and natural language processing. Applications of AI in cyber security include:

- Network protection: Machine learning has been used to improve intrusion detection systems by broadening the search beyond previously identified threats.
- Application security: AI has been used to assist in counterattacks, such as server-side request forgery, SQL injection, cross-site scripting, and distributed denial-of-service.
- Suspect user behavior: Machine learning can attempt to identify fraud or compromised applications as they occur.

== Transportation and logistics ==
=== Aviation ===
In the aviation industry, AI is used for optimized operations and predictive maintenance. Companies such as Boeing and Airbus are using AI to optimize repair procedures while maintaining operational performance.

AI is also used in flight simulators which help train pilots. Flight conditions can be simulated that allow pilots to make mistakes without risking themselves or expensive aircraft.

=== Automotive and public transit ===
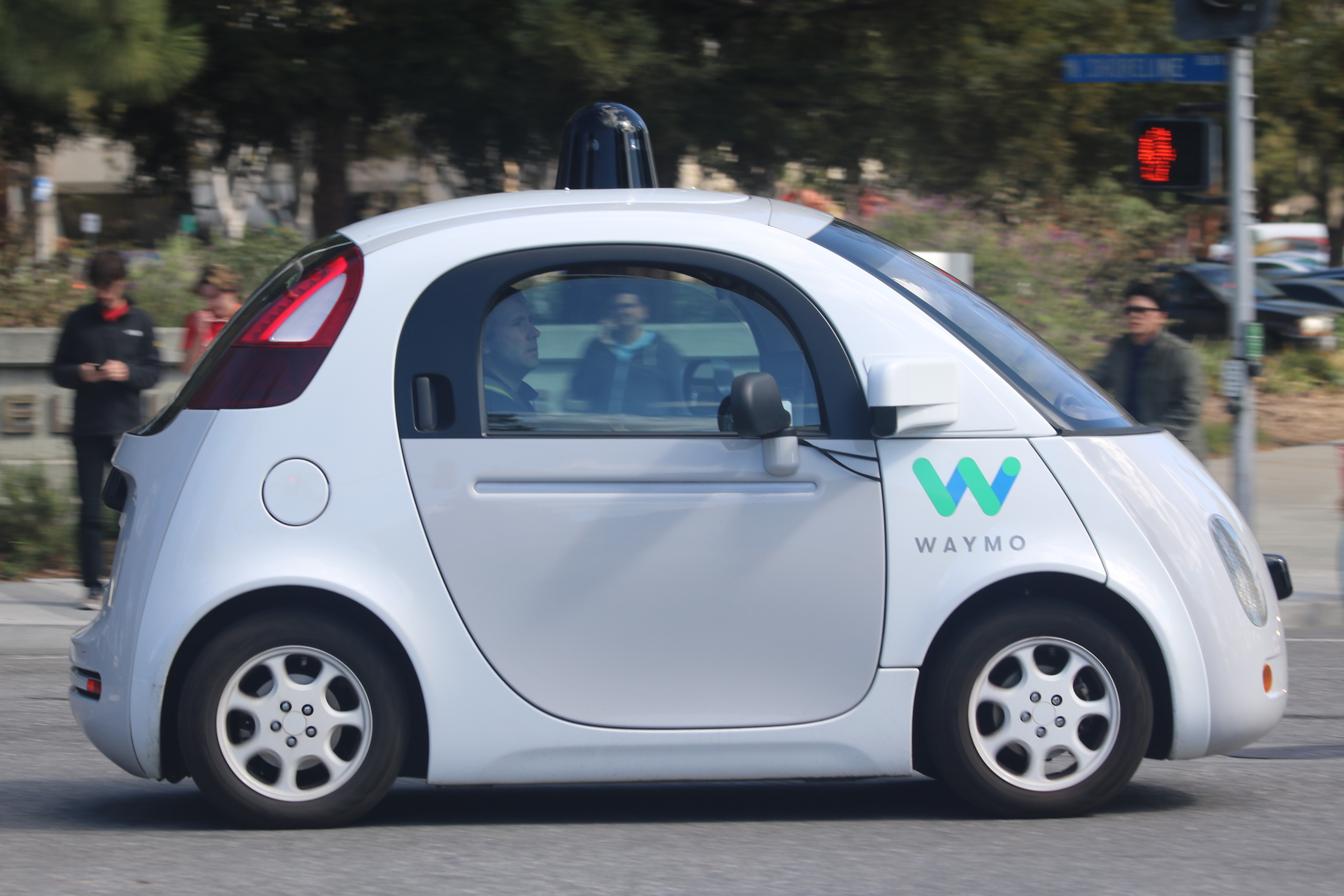
Side view of a Waymo-branded self-driving car

Due to transportation's complexity, training AI in a real-world driving environment is impractical in most cases, and is instead achieved through simulator-based testing. AI-based systems control functions such as braking, lane changing, collision prevention, navigation and mapping. Some autonomous vehicles do not allow human drivers (they have no steering wheels or pedals).

There are prototypes of autonomous automotive public transport vehicles such as autonomous rail transport in operation, electric mini-buses, and autonomous delivery vehicles, including delivery robots.

Autonomous trucks are in the testing phase. The UK government passed legislation to begin testing of autonomous truck platoons in 2018. A group of autonomous trucks follow closely behind each other. German corporation Daimler is testing its Freightliner Inspiration.

AI has been used to optimize traffic management, which can reduce wait times, energy use, and emissions. In 2026, AI tools were in development for hurricane recovery, with the goal of helping transportation officials assess damage more efficiently, improve traffic signal restoration, and better understand transportation needs.

=== Military ===
AI has been used in air combat simulations. AI is also impacting military decision-making via intelligence analysis, logistics, surveillance, and strategic planning, e.g., generating recommendations for targets or simulating battlefield scenarios. However, critics had raised concerns about increased safety risks to soldiers and civilians.

Autonomous drones can fly independently or in swarms. The US Air Force has staged dogfights with an AI-flown fighter jet, a VISTA (Variable In-flight Simulator Aircraft). The Air Force is also exploring AI tools to help predict aircraft failures.

AI-supported design of aircraft (AIDA) uses rule-based systems to help designers in the process of creating conceptual designs of aircraft. JetZero is using Siemens Xcelerator's digital twin and AI technologies to build a factory with real-time monitoring and automated quality control, designed to support current and future aircraft manufacturing.

=== NASA ===
The National Aeronautics and Space Administration (NASA) has used AI for space exploration.

In 2003, a Dryden Flight Research Center project created software that could enable a damaged aircraft to continue flight until a safe landing could be achieved. The software compensated for damaged components by relying on the remaining undamaged components.

The 2016 Intelligent Autopilot System combined apprenticeship learning and behavioral cloning whereby the autopilot observed low-level actions required to maneuver the airplane and high-level strategy used to apply those actions.

In 2026, NASA used AI navigation for the Perseverance rover on Mars.

=== Maritime ===
Neural networks are used by situational awareness systems in ships and boats. There also are autonomous boats.

== See also ==
- Applications of artificial intelligence to legal informatics
- Applications of deep learning
- Applications of machine learning
- Artificial intelligence and elections
- Collective intelligence § Applications
- List of artificial intelligence projects
- List of datasets for machine-learning research
- Open data
- Progress in artificial intelligence
- Timeline of computing 2020–present
