= Content creation =

Contribution of information to any media

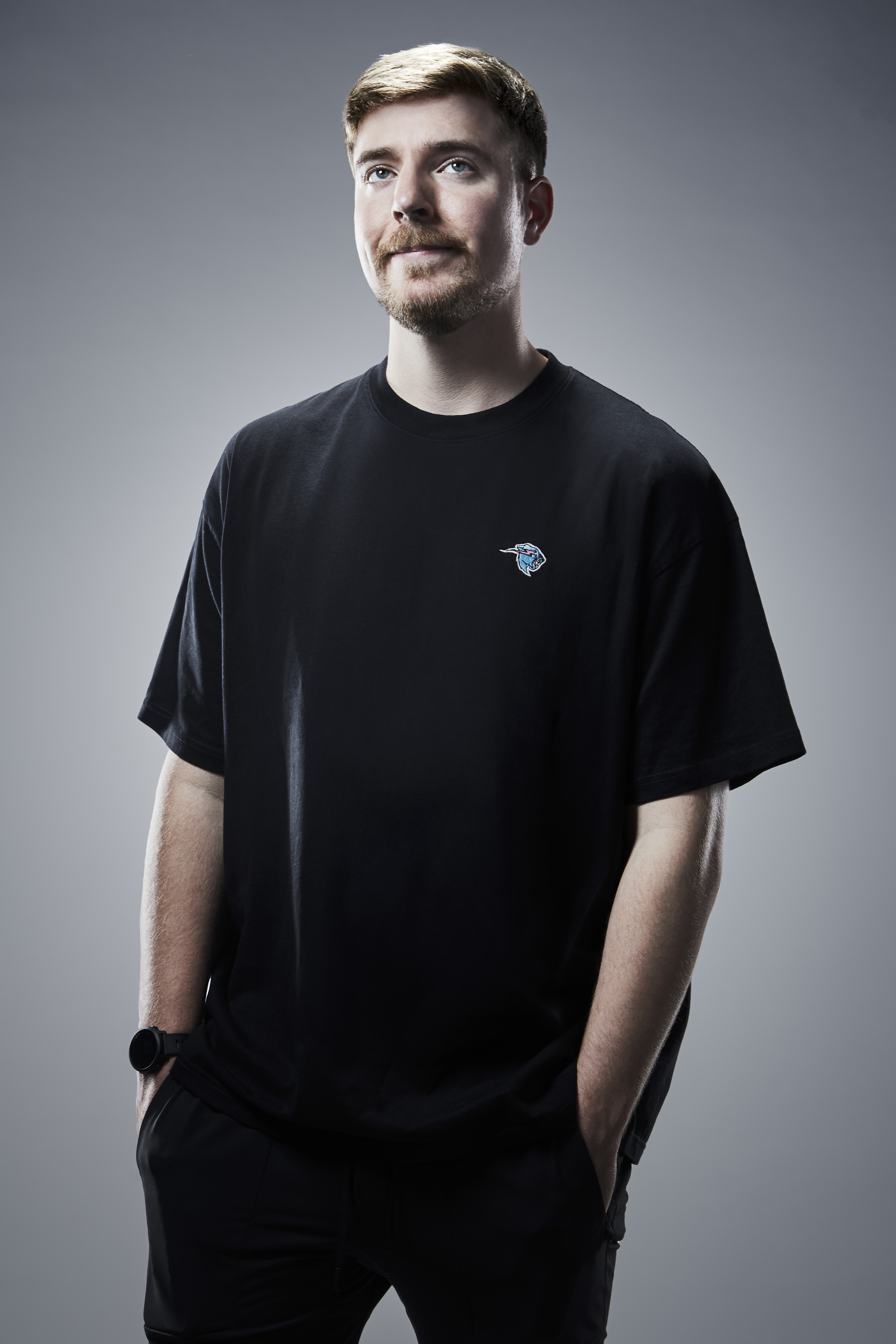
MrBeast is the most-subscribed YouTuber on the platform, with over 500 million subscribers.

Content creation is the act of making and sharing media "content", particularly in digital contexts. A content creator is the person or studio behind such content. According to Dictionary.com, content refers to "something that is to be expressed through some medium, as speech, writing or any of various arts" for self-expression, distribution, marketing and/or publication. Content creation encompasses various activities, including maintaining and updating web sites, blogging, article writing, photography, videography, online commentary, social media accounts, and editing and distribution of digital media. In a survey conducted by the Pew Research Center, the content thus created was defined as "the material people contribute to the online world".

In addition to traditional forms of content creation, digital platforms face growing challenges related to privacy, copyright, misinformation, platform moderation policies, and the repercussions of violating community guidelines. "Content creation" has also attracted criticism for devaluing art and entertainment, as the word content does not imply any skill or talent. Actor Emma Thompson charged that content was "just a rude word for creative people".

== Content creators ==
Content creation is the process of producing and sharing various forms of content such as text, images, audio, and video, designed to engage and inform a specific audience. It plays a crucial role in digital marketing, branding, and online communication and brand awareness. Content can be created for a range of platforms, including social media, websites, blogs, and multimedia channels. Whether it's through written articles, compelling photography, or engaging videos, content creation helps businesses build a connection with their audience, increase visibility, and drive traffic.

The process typically involves identifying the target audience, brainstorming ideas, creating the content, and distributing it across various channels. Successful content creation combines creativity with strategic planning, considering audience preferences, trends, and platform characteristics to achieve marketing and branding goals.

=== News organizations ===
Pre-Established News organizations, especially those with a large and global reach like The New York Times, NPR, and CNN, consistently create some of the most shared content on the Web, especially in relation to current events. In the words of a 2011 report from the Oxford School for the Study of Journalism and the Reuters Institute for the Study of Journalism, "Mainstream media is the lifeblood of topical social media conversations in the UK." While the rise of digital media has disrupted traditional news outlets, many have adapted and have begun to produce content that is designed to function on the web and be shared on social media. The social media site Twitter is a major distributor and aggregator of breaking news from various sources, and the function and value of Twitter in the distribution of news is a frequent topic of discussion and research in journalism. User-generated content, social media blogging and citizen journalism have changed the nature of news content in recent years. The company Narrative Science is now using artificial intelligence to produce news articles and interpret data.

=== Colleges, universities, and think tanks ===
Academic institutions, such as colleges and universities, create content in the form of books, journal articles, white papers, and some forms of digital scholarship, such as blogs that are group edited by academics, class wikis, or video lectures that support a massive open online course (MOOC). Through an open data initiative, institutions may make raw data supporting their experiments or conclusions available on the Web. Academic content may be gathered and made accessible to other academics or the public through publications, databases, libraries, and digital libraries. Academic content may be closed source or open access (OA). Closed-source content is only available to authorized users or subscribers. For example, an important journal or a scholarly database may be a closed source, available only to students and faculty through the institution's library. Open-access articles are open to the public, with the publication and distribution costs shouldered by the institution publishing the content.

=== Companies ===
Corporate content includes advertising and public relations content, as well as other types of content produced for profit, including white papers and sponsored research. Advertising can also include auto-generated content, with blocks of content generated by programs or bots for search engine optimization. Companies also create annual reports which are part of their company's workings and a detailed review of their financial year. This gives the stakeholders of the company insight into the company's current and future prospects and direction.

=== Artists and writers ===
Cultural works, like music, movies, literature, and art, are also major forms of content. Examples include traditionally published books and e-books as well as self-published books, digital art, fanfiction, and fan art. Independent artists, including authors and musicians, have found commercial success by making their work available on the Internet.

=== Government ===
Through digitization, sunshine laws, open records laws and data collection, governments may make statistical, legal or regulatory information available on the Internet. National libraries and state archives turn historical documents, public records, and unique relics into online databases and exhibits. This has raised significant privacy issues. In 2012, The Journal News, a New York state paper, sparked an outcry when it published an interactive map of the state's gun owner locations using legally obtained public records. Governments also create online or digital propaganda or misinformation to support domestic and international goals. This can include astroturfing, or using media to create a false impression of mainstream belief or opinion.

Governments can also use open content, such as public records and open data, in service of public health, educational and scientific goals, such as crowdsourcing solutions to complex policy problems. In 2013, the National Aeronautics and Space Administration (NASA) joined the asteroid mining company Planetary Resources to crowdsource the hunt for near-Earth objects. Describing NASA's crowdsourcing work in an interview, technology transfer executive David Locke spoke of the "untapped cognitive surplus that exists in the world" which could be used to help develop NASA technology. In addition to making governments more participatory, open records and open data have the potential to make governments more transparent and less corrupt.

=== Users ===
The introduction of Web 2.0 made it possible for content consumers to be more involved in the generation and sharing of content. With the advent of digital media, the amount of user generated content, as well as the age and class range of users, has increased. According to research 8% of Internet users are very active in content creation and consumption. Worldwide, about one in four Internet users are significant content creators, and users in emerging markets lead the world in engagement. Research has also found that young adults of a higher socioeconomic background tend to create more content than those from lower socioeconomic backgrounds. 69% of American and European internet users are "spectators", who consume—but do not create—online and digital media. The ratio of content creators to the amount of content they generate is sometimes referred to as the 1% rule, a rule of thumb that suggests that only 1% of a forum's users create nearly all of its content. Motivations for creating new content may include the desire to gain new knowledge, the possibility of publicity, or simple altruism. Users may also create new content in order to bring about social reforms. However, researchers caution that in order to be effective, context must be considered, a diverse array of people must be included, and all users must participate throughout the process.

According to a 2011 study, minorities create content in order to connect with their communities online. African-American users have been found to create content as a means of self-expression that was not previously available. Media portrayals of minorities are sometimes inaccurate and stereotypical which affects the general perception of these minorities. African-Americans respond to their portrayals digitally through the use of social media such as Twitter and Tumblr. The creation of Black Twitter has allowed a community to share their problems and ideas.

=== Teens ===
Younger users now have greater access to content, content creating applications, and the ability to publish to different types of media, such as Facebook, Blogger, Instagram, DeviantArt, or Tumblr. As of 2005, around 21 million teens used the internet and 57%, or 12 million teens, consider themselves content creators. This proportion of media creation and sharing is higher than that of adults. With the advent of the Internet, teens have had more access to tools for sharing and creating content. Increase in accessibility to technology, especially due to lower prices, has led to an increase in accessibility of content creation tools as well for teens. Some teens use this to become content creators through online platforms like YouTube, while others use it to connect to friends through social networking sites.

== Issues ==
The rise of anonymous and user-generated content presents both opportunities and challenges to Web users. Blogging, self-publishing and other forms of content creation give more people access to larger audiences. However, this can also perpetuate rumors and lead to misinformation. It can make it more difficult for users to find content that meets their information needs.

The feature of user-generated content and personalized recommendation algorithms of digital media also gives a rise to confirmation bias. Users may tend to seek out information that confirms their existing beliefs and ignore information that contradicts them. This can lead to one-sided, unbalanced content that does not present a complete picture of an issue.

The quality of digital contents varies from traditional academic or published writing. Digital media writing is often more engaging and accessible to a broader audience than academic writing, which is usually intended for a specialized audience. Digital media writers often use a conversational tone, personal anecdotes, and multimedia elements like images and videos to enhance the reader's experience. For example, the veteran populist anti-EU campaigner Farage's tweets in 2017–2018 used a lot of colloquial expressions and catchphrases to resonate the "common sense" with audiences.

At the same time, digital media is also necessary for professional (academic) communicators to reach an audience, as well as with connecting to scholars in their areas of expertise.

The quality of digital contents is also influenced by capitalism and market-driven consumerism. Writers may have commercial interests that influence the content they produce. For example, a writer who is paid to promote a particular product or service may write articles that are biased in favor of that product or service, even if it is not the best option for the reader.

With the rise of Artificial Intelligence, content creation has been more accessible to users everywhere. Researchers have found that over 80% of social media content recommendations are powered by AI now and 71% of social media images are AI-generated, reshaping content creation across platforms.

=== Ethics ===
Digital writing and content creation has evolved significantly, especially due to the influence of artificial intelligence. This has led to various ethical issues, including privacy, individual rights, and representation. The effects of artificial intelligence upon content creation can be seen heavily on social media platforms such as Instagram and TikTok. According to Sevasti Lamprou, an Artificial Intelligence researcher and journalist, AI systems are reshaping contemporary media, from "automating newsroom workflows to personalizing content delivery". Lamprou raises concerns about the algorithmic bias, and journalistic integrity seen through automated content creation. One main concern regarding the ethics of AI content creation is transparency and autonomy. Many content creators utilize AI tools and lack proper references to such usage, resulting in confusion. Lamprou suggests that AI usage should be easily labeled, not only in advertisements but also in everyday content creation. By referencing AI usage, consumers will be more aware of the heavy influences of AI, and content creators will no longer be claiming this content as fully their own work.

Others have charged that the umbrella of "content creation" has cheapened creative endeavours. Actor Emma Thompson said that content was merely "a rude word for creative people". Writing in the New York Times, Jason Bailey noted that the word was favoured by studio executives, and noted that—in contrast to words like entertainment—the word content does not imply that the creator has any particular talent.

=== Intellectual property ===
The ownership, origin, and right to share digital content can be difficult to establish. User-generated content presents challenges to traditional content creators (professional writers, artists, filmmakers, musicians, choreographers, etc.) with regard to the expansion of unlicensed and unauthorized derivative works, piracy and plagiarism. Also, the enforcement of copyright laws, such as the Digital Millennium Copyright Act in the U.S., makes it less likely that works will fall into the public domain.

=== Misinformation ===
Misinformation is a growing concern in content creation, especially on social media platforms where information spreads rapidly. Several reviews and a meta-analysis have drawn consistent conclusions about how misinformation circulates online and how platform structures may contribute to its spread. Research suggests that social media platforms are especially vulnerable to false information, including fake news, disinformation, and manipulated media, due to their algorithmic designs and engagement-driven models. These algorithms prioritize viral content, which may incentivize creators to use attention-grabbing tactics such as deepfakes, clickbait, or controversial framing.

The increasing use of artificial intelligence in content creation has contributed further to misinformation on social media, as generative AI tools enable the rapid production of highly realistic synthetic text, images, audio, and video at scale, making misleading content more difficult to detect and verify. Empirical research across a variety of social media platforms has revealed that AI-generated misinformation can differ systematically from conventional misinformation, including being more likely to spread virally despite often originating from smaller or less prominent accounts, further amplifying its spread on social media.

Other studies point to emotional appeal, cognitive biases, and features like filter bubbles and echo chambers as key factors in reinforcing misinformation. In these environments, users are repeatedly exposed to similar viewpoints, making them less likely to encounter contradicting information and more prone to accepting misinformation. A large-scale meta-analysis has also found that psychological factors such as low cognitive reflection, weaker numeracy skills, and a reliance on intuition make individuals more susceptible to online misinformation.

== Content creation policies ==
Content platforms have developed various policies to reduce misinformation and harmful content. YouTube removes videos that may cause real-world harm, such as those promoting medical falsehoods or election misinformation, and promotes content from authoritative sources in its recommendations. Meta enforces community standards that call for the removal of content promoting harm, including false health claims and incitement to violence. It has also partnered with third-party fact-checkers to review flagged material. However, as of early 2025, Meta ended its political fact-checking efforts, raising concerns about the unchecked spread of misinformation during election periods. TikTok uses both automated systems and human moderators to enforce its content rules, focusing on prevention by labeling unverified content, limiting its reach, and warning users before they share it.

These moderation policies directly affect how content is created, shared, and monetized. Enforcement systems, such as account warnings, suspensions, and bans, can impact a creator's visibility and earnings. Scholars have noted that these restrictions may lead creators to self-censor or shift their messaging to avoid penalties. While platforms often promote the effectiveness of their moderation strategies, independent evaluations of enforcement practices remain limited. Researchers have called for greater transparency and third-party oversight to assess how platform policies shape both content creation and public discourse.

=== Repercussions for content violations ===
Each platform enforces its misinformation policies through different systems. YouTube uses a three-strike model that begins with warnings and can escalate to demonetization or removal from the YouTube Partner Program, limiting creators' ability to earn revenue. TikTok implements a tiered approach that includes warnings, temporary feature restrictions, and permanent account bans for repeated or severe violations. Meta continues to remove content related to harmful misinformation such as false health claims and incitement, but no longer fact-checks political content, reducing oversight in that category.

These enforcement mechanisms have significant consequences for content creators. Researchers have noted a lack of transparency around how policies are enforced, with limited public data available about takedown frequency, appeal success rates, or algorithmic decision-making. This makes it difficult for creators, researchers, and policymakers to evaluate the fairness and consistency of enforcement. Some scholars suggest that increased transparency, public reporting, and independent audits would improve accountability and help balance content moderation with freedom of expression.

== Social movements ==
=== 2011 Egyptian revolution ===
Content creation serves as a useful form of protest on social media platforms. The 2011 Egyptian revolution was one example of content creation being used to network protestors globally for the common cause of protesting the "authoritarian regimes in the Middle East and North Africa throughout 2011". The protests took place in multiple cities in Egypt, and quickly evolved from peaceful protest into open conflict. Social media outlets allowed protestors from different regions to network with each other and raise awareness of the widespread corruption in Egypt's government, as well as helping coordinate their response. Youth activists promoting the rebellion were able to formulate a Facebook group, "Progressive Youth of Tunisia".

=== Other ===
Examples of recent social media protest through online content include the global widespread use of the hashtags #MeToo, used to raise awareness against sexual abuse, and #BlackLivesMatter, which focused on police brutality against black people.

== See also ==
- Content intelligence
- Content marketing – Form of marketing focused on creating content for a targeted audience online
- Copyright – Legal concept regulating rights of a creative work
- Creative commons – Organization designing open copyright licenses
- Creative economy (economic system) – Economic system using creative imagination
- Creator economy – Economy of online content creators
- Cultural technology – South Korean media marketing system
- Crowdsourcing – Sourcing services or funds from a group
- Fan work – Activities done by fans of a work
- Open content – Free licensed works in any field
- Open-source intelligence – Data collected from publicly available sources to be used in an intelligence context
- Podcast – Type of audio digital media
- Webcam model – Livestream video performer
- Web 2.0 – Websites that use technology beyond the static pages of the early Internet
