= Stats Perform =

British sports technology and data company

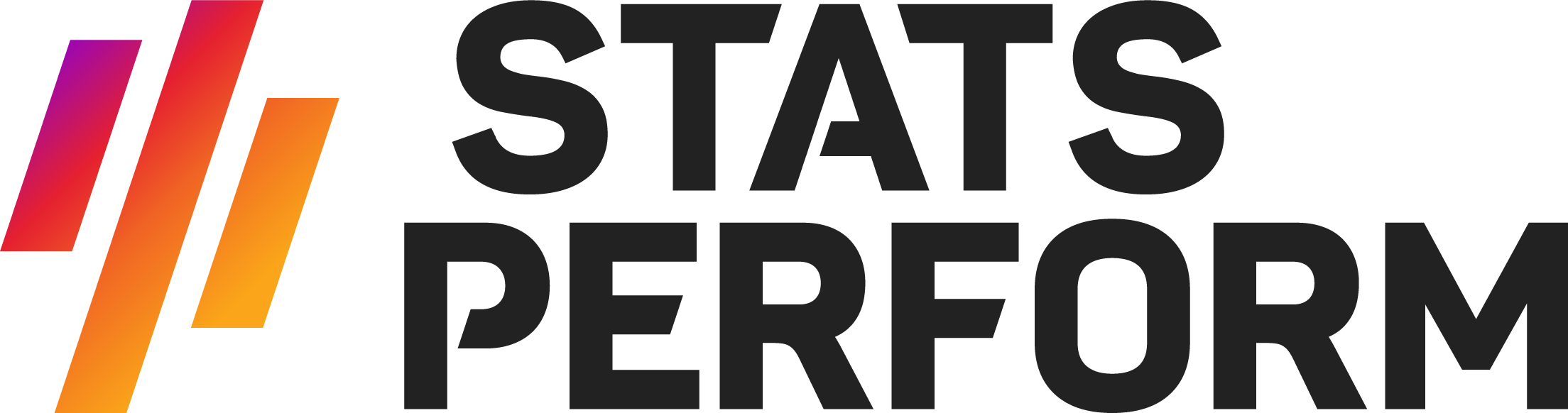
- Formerly: STATS, LLC
- Type: Private
- Industry: Sports technology and data
- Founded: 30 April 1981
- Headquarters: London, United Kingdom
- Key people: Carl Mergele (CEO)
- Owner: Vista Equity Partners
- Website: www.statsperform.com

Stats Perform (formerly STATS, LLC and STATS, Inc.) is a British sports AI company formed through the merger of Stats and Perform. The company is involved in sports data collection and predictive analysis for use across various sports sectors including professional team performance, digital, media, broadcast and betting. The company began investing in AI in 2015.

Its clients include media outlets, sports leagues and teams, fantasy sports and sports betting services. As of 2023, the company covers 500,000+ matches and 3,900 competitions annually and produces an infinite number of datapoints per game.

== History ==
STATS, Inc. was founded in April 1981 by John Dewan, who became the company's CEO. The company name is an acronym for "Sports Team Analysis and Tracking Systems." STATS was an outgrowth of the grassroots non-profit Project Scoresheet, a volunteer network created to collect baseball statistics.

Perform Group was originally formed in 2007 via the merger of Premium TV Limited and Inform Group. It was originally involved in content distribution, subscription, advertising and sponsorship, and technology and production.

In 2013, Perform Group acquired Opta Sports. Opta Index Limited was founded in 1996 and remains part of Stats Perform. Its purpose is to analyse Premier League football matches and was contracted by Sky Sports for their television broadcasts of the 1996–97 season. The following season, Opta became the official statistics provider for the league itself and became sponsored by Carling. The company was sold to Perform Group in 2013 for £40 million and remains part of Stats Perform. Today the Opta brand, its stats and Opta AI predictions are seen in sports media all over the world.

In 2019, Stats merged with Perform Content following its sale to parent company Vista Equity Partners.

== Vista Equity Partners ownership, merger with Perform Content ==
In June 2014, Fox Sports and the AP sold STATS LLC to Vista Equity Partners, a private equity firm.

In early 2015, STATS acquired the wire services The Sports Network and Prozone. Vista Equity Partners also acquired Automated Insights, a company involved in using natural-language generation based on big data (including in particular, generating wire reports on sporting events from raw statistics).

In April 2019, Vista Equity Partners announced its intent to acquire Perform Content, the former sports data subsidiary of Perform Group. The company was selling the property to focus more on its sports streaming service DAZN. It was stated that DAZN Group would retain a "significant minority stake" in the surviving entity, which was to focus strongly on the use of artificial intelligence and machine learning.

On 15 July 2019, it was announced that the merged company would be known as Stats Perform, and operate under STATS CEO Carl Mergele. He stated that the company would "[harness] the power of immense amounts of sports data with unparalleled AI technology".

In October 2020, Stats Perform experienced a three week outage affecting key customers, including Yahoo! Sports. Yahoo! Sports apologised for this outage "While we have never experienced an outage like this in our 20-year-plus history, you deserve better and we expect better of ourselves."

In March 2023, Stats Perform is sued for stealing exclusive soccer data. Rival IMG argues that Stats Perform uses spies at games of the English Premier League (EPL) and other European leagues to collect data for which IMG has exclusive rights.

In October 25, 2025 Stats Perform forced to refinance debt for purchase of Perform and excess costs due to failed litigations. As part of the merger, Stats Perform was put under a shell company "Peak Jersey Holdco Ltd", and this holding company is rated at "CCC", reflects increased likelihood of payment default.

== Partnerships with leagues and Federations ==
Over its history, Stats Perform has attempted to build several long-term partnerships with global sports leagues and federations to collect and commercialise sports data, streaming and AI capabilities. These include Premier League, WTA, FIBA, La Liga and Serie A. However, in October 2024 Stats Perform abruptly moved to withdraw from its agreement for betting rights to Italy’s Serie A, shocking staff on both sides of the deal. This after the two parties spent months going back and forward on contractual points. As well as commercial services, Stats Perform also provides integrity services to major leagues to help in the prevention, detection and response to match manipulation.

The STATS FCS awards have been presented annually by STATS LLC since 2015 to recognise the most outstanding collegiate football players and coach in the NCAA Division I Football Championship Subdivision. Each winner is selected by a national panel of sports information and media relations directors, broadcasters, writers, and other dignitaries.

The honours include the STATS FCS Offensive Player of the Year award, given to the top offensive player, the STATS FCS Defensive Player of the Year award, recognising the best defensive player, the STATS FCS Freshman Player of the Year award, honouring the most outstanding freshman player, and the STATS FCS Coach of the Year award, recognising the most outstanding head coach.
