= StatSheet =

StatSheet was an online sports content network based in Durham, North Carolina, which was powered by an automated publishing platform. The network included 345 sites - one for every Division 1 college basketball team. The company had previously announced that the network would continue to grow, and would include sites covering nearly every college and professional sport by the end of 2011.

StatSheet was founded in 2007 by Robbie Allen, a 13-year veteran of Cisco, where he worked as an engineer in their IT department. The company provided detailed statistics for NCAA basketball, college Football, NASCAR, and the NBA. In addition, the company provided a service called Embed StatSheet, which allowed customers to integrate historical or real-time stats, charts, and other graphical elements on a website or blog.

Each sponsored site provided real time updates, game previews, game recaps, injury updates and other reports, all published automatically using no human journalists, bloggers, or other writers. StatSheet also provided users with access to its data visualization platform designed to organize, generate, and deliver relevant real-time and historical statistics through a central portal. Users could query these statistics, build custom graphs and charts, and receive real-time updates on specific players and teams. Data was available for leagues, teams, players, coaches, and referees.

StatSheet changed its name to Automated Insights in 2011 to mark its expansion into non-sports topics such as finance and real estate.
