= Narrative Science =

American natural language generation company

- Type: Private
- Industry: Technology; Software
- Founded: January 2010; 16 years ago
- Founder: Larry Birnbaum; Stuart Frankel; Nick Beil; Kris Hammond
- Fate: Sold to Salesforce and Integrated into Tableau Software
- Headquarters: Chicago, Illinois, U.S.
- Products: Lexio Quill
- Parent: Salesforce

Narrative Science was a natural language generation company based in Chicago, Illinois, that specialized in data storytelling. As of December 17, 2021, Narrative Science was acquired by Salesforce and has been integrated into Salesforce's Tableau Software.

== History ==
Narrative Science was founded in 2010 in Evanston, Illinois, after a student project in the Intelligent Information Lab at Northwestern University jump started the NLG technology. The first prototype of the company technology went by the project name StatsMonkey and was developed in the laboratory by Kris Hammond, Larry Birnbaum, Nick Allen and John Templon. StatsMonkey was created to allow stories based in data, specifically baseball stories at the beginning, to be written automatically by StatsMonkey. These baseball stories would include recaps based on game data like players, win probability and game score. Narrative Science licensed StatsMonkey and the related intellectual property from Northwestern and began commercial operations in early 2010. Afterwards the company decided to change direction, they no longer focused on the journalistic capabilities of their technology and focused on how the same technology could be used in the business world. This led to the development of a Natural Language Generation platform called Quill, which analyzes structured data and automatically generates intelligent narratives for business users who are not data fluent. Narrative Science has several investors, including SAP Ventures and In-Q-Tel, the investment arm of the Central Intelligence Agency. In 2014, the Chicago company raised another $10 million in equity financing, led by customer USAA, for a total of $32 million raised since the company’s inception. In 2020, Narrative Science launched Data Storytelling for Good, their non-profit branch which provides their products for free to organizations doing good in their community.

On November 15, 2021, Narrative Science announced an agreement to be acquired by Salesforce. The deal closed on December 17, 2021, and Narrative Science was folded into Tableau. In the announcement of the close, Salesforce indicated that Narrative Science's products would no longer be sold on a stand-alone basis.

== Recognition ==
In 2017, Fortune listed Narrative Science as one of the 50 companies leading the artificial intelligence revolution. In 2015, CNBC named Narrative Science to their Disruptor 50 list.

Gartner named Narrative Science as one of the “Cool Vendors in Smart Machines” in 2014.

In 2013, the company was named to the Red Herring Top 100 for North America, which highlights promising startups in Asia, Europe, and the Americas.

Narrative Science won a 2013 Edison Award for Innovative Services in Collaboration and Knowledge Management.

In 2018, Narrative Science was part of the World Economic Forum's Technology Pioneers.

In 2018, Narrative Science was named Most Innovative Company by Crain's Chicago Business.

== Competitors ==
According to Gartner's 2019 "Market Guide for NLG", the main NLG companies are (in alphabetical order): Arria NLG, Automated Insights, AX Semantics, Narrative Science, vPhrase and Yseop. Other similar companies in the area of natural language generation include Smartologic, Retresco, United Robots and Linguastat.

== Criticism ==
The company received some early criticism from journalists speculating that Narrative Science was attempting to eliminate the jobs of writers, particularly in sports and finance. Critics also argue that biases and assumptions in original data sets can lead to reinforced bias in the stories generated by natural language processors, such as Narrative Science. A CBS article compared artificially generated journalism in the financial sector to the property market bubble, as it leads to “everyone making investments in the same way for the same reasons”. The article claimed that computer-generated narratives have the “potential to amplify biases and assumptions, but at far greater speed and on a far wider scale than anything written by humans.”

An article from the Columbia Journalism School also criticized the limitations of “robo-journalism” software, as “it can’t assess the damage on the ground, can’t interview experts, and can’t discern the relative newsworthiness of various aspects of the story” and therefore, lacks a necessary human element.

== See also ==
- Narrative Inquiry
- Natural Language Processing
