= Public data =

Public data may refer to:

- Open data
- any data that inadvertently becomes public affecting information privacy
