= The Dog & the Boy =

2023 Japanese animated science fiction short film

The Dog & The Boy

Japanese name
- Kanji: 犬と少年
- Directed by: Ryōtarō Makihara
- Produced by: Taiki Sakurai
- Edited by: Aya Hida
- Music by: Sasakure.UK
- Animation by: Ryotaro Makihara; Mathias Demongeot
- Backgrounds by: AI (+ Human)
- Production companies: Netflix Anime Creators' Base; Wit Studio; Rinna
- Distributed by: Netflix
- Release date: January 31, 2023 (YouTube)
- Running time: 3 minutes
- Country: Japan

The Dog & the Boy (Note: Also referred to as Dog and Boy.) (Japanese: 犬と少年, romanized: Inu to Shōnen) is a 2023 animated science fiction short film directed by Ryōtarō Makihara. Distributed by Netflix and released on YouTube on 31 January 2023, the film follows the friendship between a robot dog and a boy. It became notable for its use of artificial intelligence art to create its background artwork, which was widely negatively received online.

== Plot ==
A young boy finds a robot dog in a forest under a pile of garbage. The two become close and spend time playing, fishing, and biking together as the seasons change. The boy gets older and, during a fireworks display, his city starts getting bombed. The boy leaves the city while the dog gets left behind to watch as it gets decimated. The seasons continue to change until a team of workers in hazmat suits arrive, one of whom kicks the dog into rubble and causes it to pass out. The dog wakes up to find that the boy, now an old man, has found him in the rubble, and the two embrace.

== Production ==
The Dog & the Boy was directed by Ryōtarō Makihara, who also served as its storyboarder and key animator. It was produced by the Tokyo-based animation studio Netflix Anime Creators Base, launched in September 2021, alongside Japanese production company Wit Studio and the Japanese artificial intelligence art studio Rinna, the latter of which had been spun off from Microsoft's artificial intelligence chatbot of the same name in 2015. It was the first production by Netflix Anime Creators Base to use generative artificial intelligence. Production on the film began in January 2022 and it was released on YouTube on January 31, 2023. It runs for three minutes. The film's background artwork was made with the assistance of artificial intelligence, with its background designer credited as "AI + Human". The backgrounds were first drawn by hand as concept art by an unnamed animator before being processed using artificial intelligence several times and tweaked by hand again. According to Daiki Sakurai, Netflix's chief anime producer, the film utilized an original artificial intelligence art program based on DALL-E that exclusively used 5,000 to 6,000 pieces of background art from Netflix original programming; Ars Technica's Benj Edwards wrote that the program appeared similar to Stable Diffusion's "img2img" process that transformed a preexisting image based on a text prompt.

The film's theme song, "Ainouta", was made by Sasakure.UK and features AI-code"M". Other staff included Mathias Demongeot as CG animator and character designer, Aya Hida as editor, Yūko Fujita as color supervisor, Kōji Tanaka as composition director, and Chieko Ichimanda as animation supervisor.

== Reception ==
A tweet posted to Netflix Japan's Twitter account on the same day as the film's release read, in Japanese,

As an experimental effort to help the anime industry, which has a labor shortage, we used image generation technology for the background images of all three-minute video cuts!

The tweet drew widespread backlash from Twitter users and anime workers, who accused Netflix of using artificial intelligence to avoid paying artists. The backlash mostly took place outside of Japan. In a response, Hamish Steele, the creator of the Netflix animated television series Dead End: Paranormal Park, tweeted, "Not something to be proud of babes." The controversy also took place amidst the rise of other concerns among artists surrounding artificial intelligence art, such as copyright and job loss. Engadget's Igor Bonifacic wrote that the labor shortage referenced in the tweet was the result of "unsustainable labor practices" among Japanese animation studios. For The Mary Sue, Jack Doyle criticized the credits' listing of the unnamed background animator simply as "Human", writing that there was "something so blatantly disrespectful about not crediting living, breathing human beings for their work that it almost feels detached, machinelike".

Amanda Yeo of Mashable wrote that The Dog & The Boy was not "a unique story" and that criticism of its AI-generated backgrounds was "fair". Animation Guild president Jeanette Moreno King stated that the film "looked hackneyed" and did not "look original" or "like it was breaking any kind of new ground". For Popular Science, Chilean animator Sebastián Bisbal said that the film had "quite poor" quality due to artistic inconsistencies.
