= Pypestream =

American software company

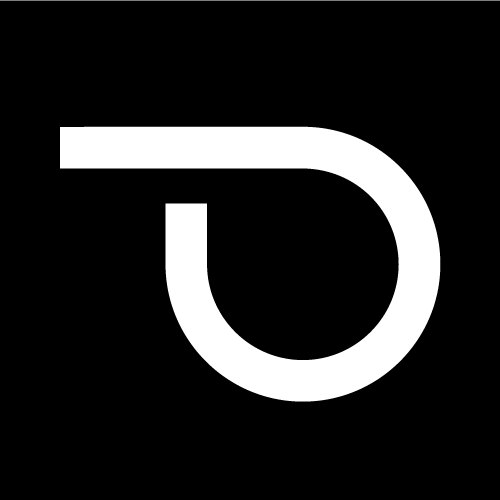
- Industry: Enterprise Artificial Intelligence
- Founded: 2015; 11 years ago in New York City
- Founder: Richard Smullen
- Website: pypestream.com

Pypestream is an American software company that offers a self-service automation platform. The company was founded in 2015 by Richard Smullen, the co-founder of Genesis Media LLC, and is headquartered in New York City.

== Technology ==
The Pypestream platform drives an engagement interface called a Pype that uses conversational AI within a graphical user interface. It gained popularity due to the high cost of assisted-service engagements versus the minuscule cost of self-service engagements, coupled with the brand-enhancing experience delivered by a Pype. It is used for customer service, employee service, recruiting, patient service, traveler service, marketing, and other automated engagement use cases. Pypestream couples AI-driven natural-language understanding (NLU) with a widget-based GUI that encourages pointing, swiping and gestures.

== History ==
In late December 2015, Pypestream's mobile application launched in beta.

By April 2016, the company had 500 businesses signed up and using the messaging platform, including Washington Gas and Billboard. The same year, the company was named in the Red Herring list of 100 most exciting startups in North America and announced a partnership with Discovery Health, the largest medical scheme administrator in South Africa, in order to include the Pypestream technology in the app for members of Discovery Health Medical Scheme. In July 2016, Pypestream partnered with Insurance Thought Leadership to create a messaging platform specialized for insurance customer service. As of 2016, there were over 12,000 businesses using Pypestream since its launch in December 2015.

In February, 2017, Pypestream raised $15 million in funding from Rick Braddock and The Chattergee Group.

In 2018, Pypestream was named one of the four Hot Vendors in Conversational AI by Aragon Research. Its current clients include Allianz, EY, Google, Sling, Brown & Brown, and Shell. The company has been granted five patents by the U.S. Patent Office and secured $15 million in funding by W.R. Berkley, bringing their total up to $35 million.
