= Yseop =

French software company

Yseop (pronounced Easy-op) is a software company that develops artificial intelligence (AI) solutions for regulatory and medical writing in the life sciences and pharmaceutical industries. The company provides enterprise AI platforms designed to automate the creation, updating, and quality control of scientific and regulatory documents in regulated environments.

Yseop is known for its use of a composite AI approach, combining large language models (LLMs) with symbolic AI, structured data models, and retrieval-based techniques to support accuracy, traceability, and regulatory compliance.

== Overview ==
Yseop’s platform supports pharmaceutical companies in producing complex regulatory documentation such as clinical study reports (CSRs), patient narratives, protocols, and submission dossiers. The software is designed to integrate directly into existing regulatory workflows, enabling teams to generate and maintain documents as underlying data evolves.

The company’s technology is used by pharmaceutical organizations to reduce manual effort, improve consistency across documents, and support regulatory timelines while maintaining compliance with applicable standards.

Yseop operates internationally, with offices in Paris, Lyon, and New York.

== History ==
Yseop was founded by Alain Kaeser, based on research conducted at École normale supérieure Paris-Saclay (formerly ENS Cachan). In its early years, the company focused on applying symbolic AI and rule-based natural language generation to automate structured scientific and business content.

As AI technologies evolved, Yseop expanded its platform to incorporate large language models, retrieval-augmented generation (RAG), and agent-based automation, while retaining deterministic controls required for regulated use cases. This hybrid architecture was developed to address limitations of standalone generative AI systems in regulatory contexts, such as reproducibility, explainability, and auditability.

The company is led by CEO Emmanuel Walckenaer. Founder Alain Kaeser remains involved in strategic and technological direction.

== Products ==
Yseop Copilot is the company’s primary platform for regulatory and medical writing automation. It is designed for use in GxP-regulated environments and supports both data-driven and narrative content generation.

Key characteristics of the platform include:

- Composite AI architecture combining LLMs with symbolic AI, structured templates, and knowledge graphs.
- Human-in-the-loop workflows that allow subject matter experts to review, validate, and control generated content.
- Traceability and audit readiness, with clear links between source data and generated text.
- Enterprise deployment, including private cloud hosting and integration with tools such as Microsoft Word and Veeva Vault.

The platform is used across clinical development, regulatory affairs, pharmacovigilance, and chemistry, manufacturing, and controls (CMC) documentation.

== Industry Impact ==
Yseop operates within the broader adoption of generative AI in the pharmaceutical industry, where automation is increasingly applied to research, clinical development, and regulatory operations. Industry analyses estimate that generative AI could deliver tens of billions of dollars in annual productivity gains across the pharmaceutical sector.

Yseop’s approach focuses on applying generative AI within structured, governed workflows to meet regulatory expectations for accuracy, consistency, and compliance.

== Awards & Recognition ==
2023

- Listed among the Top 10 Natural Language Generation Companies alongside OpenAI and Google.
- Finalist at the Global Business Tech Awards for Tech Company of the Year.
- Winner at the Citeline Awards for Best Use of Artificial Intelligence in Clinical Trials.
- Nominated for World Technology Leader Awards, alongside OpenAI and BMW.

2024

- Finalist at the Citeline Awards for the second year in a row.
- Shortlisted for the Business Intelligence Group’s Artificial Intelligence Excellence Awards.
- Winner of Gold at the Merit Awards for Best AI Product.
- Awarded Silver status by Ecovadis for sustainability (Top 15%).

2025

- Winner of the BIG Innovation Award.
- Named one of Time’s Best Inventions in the Medical & Healthcare category.
