= Automated Insights =

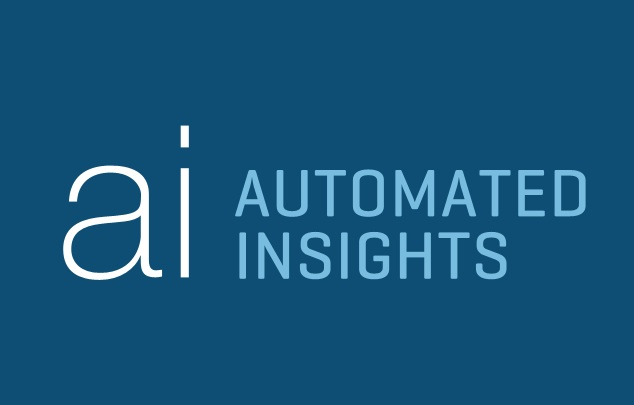
- Type: Private
- Industry: Technology; Software
- Founded: 2007
- Founder: Robbie Allen
- Headquarters: Durham, North Carolina, United States
- Key people: Robbie Allen (Executive Chairman)
- Products: Wordsmith for Marketing
- Parent: Vista Equity Partners
- Website: automatedinsights.com

Automated Insights (AI) is an American-based technology company specializing in natural language generation (NLG) software that turns big data into readable narratives.

Their flagship product, Wordsmith, transforms structured data into written narratives, allowing businesses to automate the creation of reports, articles, and other content. This technology is used by organizations like the Associated Press to automate the generation of news stories from financial data.

Automated Insights produced 300 million pieces of content in 2013, which Mashable reported was greater than the output of all major media companies combined. In 2014, the company's software generated one billion stories. In 2016, Automated Insights produced over 1.5 billion pieces of content.

== History ==
The company was founded by Robbie Allen in 2007 while he was a full-time engineer at Cisco Systems. The company was initially named Stat-Sheet and provided in-depth statistics for NCAA basketball along with other sports. The company then changed its name to Automated Insights in 2011 to mark its expansion into content generation for industries outside of sports.

Vista Equity Partners acquired Automated Insights in February 2015 but remains independent.

In October 2015, Automated Insights released its Wordsmith software for beta testing to allow organizations access to natural language generation technology as a SaaS offering.

Along with Amazon, Automated Insights hosted a hackathon in January 2017 in North Carolina, where it promoted the use of Wordsmith to help voice assistants like Amazon's Alexa.

== Natural language generation ==
Automated Insights provides natural language generation (NLG) technology in the form of their Wordsmith platform. Natural language generation is a software process that automatically turns data into human-friendly prose. Structured data is fed into NLG software and run through a narrative template, producing content that reads as if a human writer created it. The technology is used mainly in instances that require a routine, large-scale production of content in which each narrative is similarly structured.

== Products ==
=== Wordsmith ===
Wordsmith is AI's platform for natural language generation. It is "an artificial intelligence system that uses mounds of data, quantitative analysis and some rules about style and good writing" to produce stories. Wordsmith is sold as both a direct product and service to clients. In October 2015, the Wordsmith platform was updated to allow users to create their narratives through online software. Software users upload their data and create templates for writing narratives.

Wordsmith is "a sort of personal data scientist, sifting through reams of data that might otherwise go un-analyzed and creating custom reports that often have an audience of one." The service works by ingesting structured data, analyzing it for insights, and then writing out those insights in human-friendly prose.

The company has since commercialized the natural language generation platform called Wordsmith, with customers including Yahoo, Associated Press, and Tableau.

== Notable work ==
=== Associated Press ===
In June 2014, The Associated Press announced it would use automation technology from Automated Insights to produce most of its U.S. corporate earnings stories. AP said automation would boost its output of quarterly earnings stories nearly fifteen-fold, further noting that the technology would "free journalists to do more journalism and less data processing."

The Associated Press is the first newsroom to have an automated editor to oversee automated articles. Use of the Automated Insights software increased the Associated Press coverage of corporate earnings stories by over tenfold. A study by researchers at Stanford and the University of Washington found that Automated Insights’ technology has affected the stock market, as firms that received little attention from traders now see significant increases in trade volume and liquidity.

The Daily Show with Trevor Noah aired a segment on the AP's use of automation on October 7, 2015.

=== Yahoo ===
Automated Insights (Ai) generates personalized recaps and previews for Yahoo Sports Fantasy Football.

=== Collaborations and integrations ===
As of June 2017, Automated Insights collaborations and integrations include Amazon Alexa, Tableau, TIBCO Spotfire, MicroStrategy, Zapier, Microsoft Excel, and Google Sheets.

=== Other ===
Other Automated Insights work includes automation of marketing reports with the company's Wordsmith for Marketing tool and content generated for Comcast, Edmunds.com, Great Call, Digital STROM, and Bodybuilding.com.
